= Incahuasi =

Mountain in Argentina

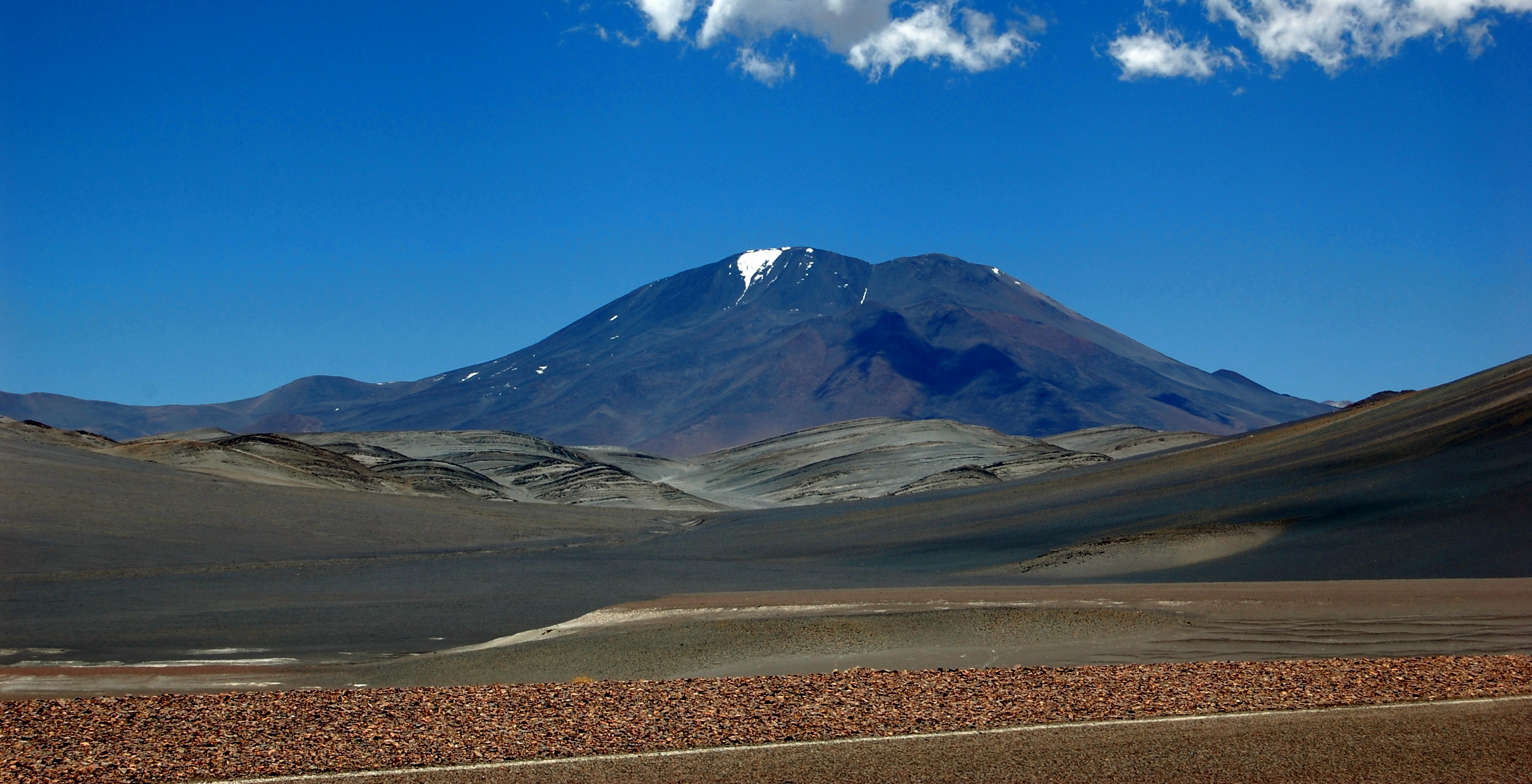
- Incahuasi volcano as seen from route 60, Fiambala, Argentina

Highest point
- Elevation: 6,621 or 6,638 m (21,722 or 21,778 ft)
- Prominence: 1,518 m (4,980 ft)
- Listing: Ultra
- Coordinates: 27°01′59″S 68°17′46″W

Geography
- Location within Argentina
- Location: Catamarca, Argentina - Atacama, Chile
- Parent range: Andes

Geology
- Mountain type(s): stratovolcanoes and caldera
- Last eruption: Unknown

Climbing
- First ascent: 1913 by Walther Penck

Incahuasi (Spanish pronunciation: [iŋkaˈwasi]; possibly from Quechua: inka Inca, wasi house) is a volcanic mountain in the Andes of South America. It lies on the border of the Catamarca Province of Argentina and the Atacama Region of Chile. Incahuasi has a summit elevation of 6,621 metres (21,722 ft) above sea level.

The volcano consists of a 3.5-kilometre-wide (2.2 mi) caldera and two stratovolcanoes. Four pyroclastic cones located 7 kilometres (4.3 mi) to the northeast have produced basalt-andesite lava flows that cover an area of 10 square kilometres (4 sq mi).

== Geography and geology ==
Incahuasi lies on the border between Argentina and Chile, close to Paso San Francisco. A major road crosses the border there.

=== Regional ===
Incahuasi is part of the Central Volcanic Zone of the Andes, together with about 110 other Quaternary volcanoes, and lies in the southern sector of this zone; other volcanic zones in the Andes are the Northern Volcanic Zone, the Southern Volcanic Zone, and the Austral Volcanic Zone. The history of volcanic activity of most of these volcanoes is poorly understood owing to the lack of dating; only a few historical eruptions have been recorded, such as an eruption at Ojos del Salado in 1993.

Incahuasi is located northeast of Ojos del Salado, the highest volcano in the world. Both volcanoes are found at the southern end of the Central Volcanic Zone. Together with El Fraile, Cerro El Muerto, Nevado Tres Cruces, and El Solo, they form a 50-kilometre-long (31 mi) volcanic chain.

The area is dominated by volcanoes that were active after 1.5 million years ago. Also located close to Incahuasi are Falso Azufre and Nevado San Francisco, as well as the Miocene Cerro Morocho and Cerro Ojo de Las Lozas volcanoes. It has been suggested that a perpendicular chain of volcanoes including Ojos del Salado may be the consequence of the Juan Fernández Ridge subducting in the Peru–Chile Trench.

Geological evidence suggests that volcanism in the area dates back to the Oligocene and Miocene, when the main volcanic arc was located 40 kilometres (25 mi) west in the Maricunga Belt. Between 9 and 6 million years ago, volcanic activity in the Maricunga Belt decreased and eventually ceased. Simultaneously, the back-arc experienced increased volcanic activity. Beginning 8.3 million years ago, there was a change in tectonic regime from an east-west compression to a north-south stretching, which led to a change in the alignments of the volcanoes.

=== Local ===
Incahuasi is formed by a caldera 3.5 kilometres (2.2 mi) wide. Two coalesced stratovolcanoes formed within the caldera and have a diameter of 15 kilometres (9.3 mi). A 6-by-4-kilometre-wide (3.7 mi × 2.5 mi) lava dome is located on the eastern flank. The volcano has a volume of about 231 cubic kilometres (55 cu mi) and covers a surface area of about 207 square kilometres (80 sq mi). With a height of 6,621 metres (21,722 ft), Incahuasi is the 12th-highest mountain in South America and one of the world's highest volcanoes.

Incahuasi has two craters, a summit crater and an arcuate crater on the eastern slope that contains a lava dome. The summit crater has dimensions of 750 by 900 metres (2,460 ft × 2,950 ft) and is embedded within a 2-kilometre-high (1.2 mi) summit plateau. Subsidiary vents conversely are associated with fissure vents. The edifice appears to consist of two overlapping volcanoes.

The western and southwestern slopes of Incahuasi are dotted with lava domes, which are more subdued than on other volcanoes in the region. Lava flows less than 1 kilometre (0.62 mi) wide and 5 kilometres (3.1 mi) long extend down the volcano. They reach the Las Coladas salar east of Incahuasi. Two 2-kilometre-long (1.2 mi) coulees extend north and east of the main crater.

7 kilometres (4.3 mi) northeast of Incahuasi, four pyroclastic cones can be found. They have covered 10 square kilometres (3.9 sq mi) with lava but they are probably an independent volcanic system, similar to other regional mafic volcanoes. On Incahuasi's eastern flank lies a major lava dome and a field of lava flows. Incahuasi rises over a surface with elevations of 4,300–4,700 metres (14,100–15,400 ft). The volcano is surrounded by a field of small volcanoes that is known as the Incahuasi field; it contains 19 small volcanoes with a total rock volume of 4.4 cubic kilometres (1.1 cu mi), which were active during the last 1 million years.

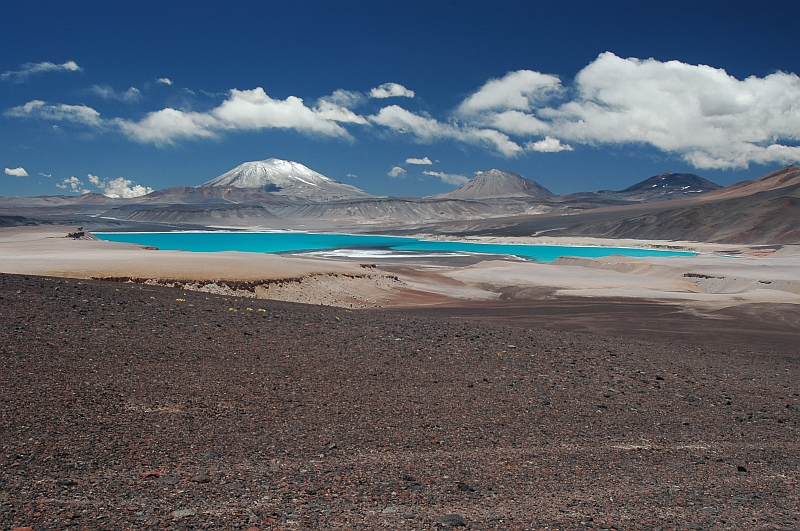
Incahuasi is the volcano at the left and El Fraile immediately right. The green lake is Laguna Verde

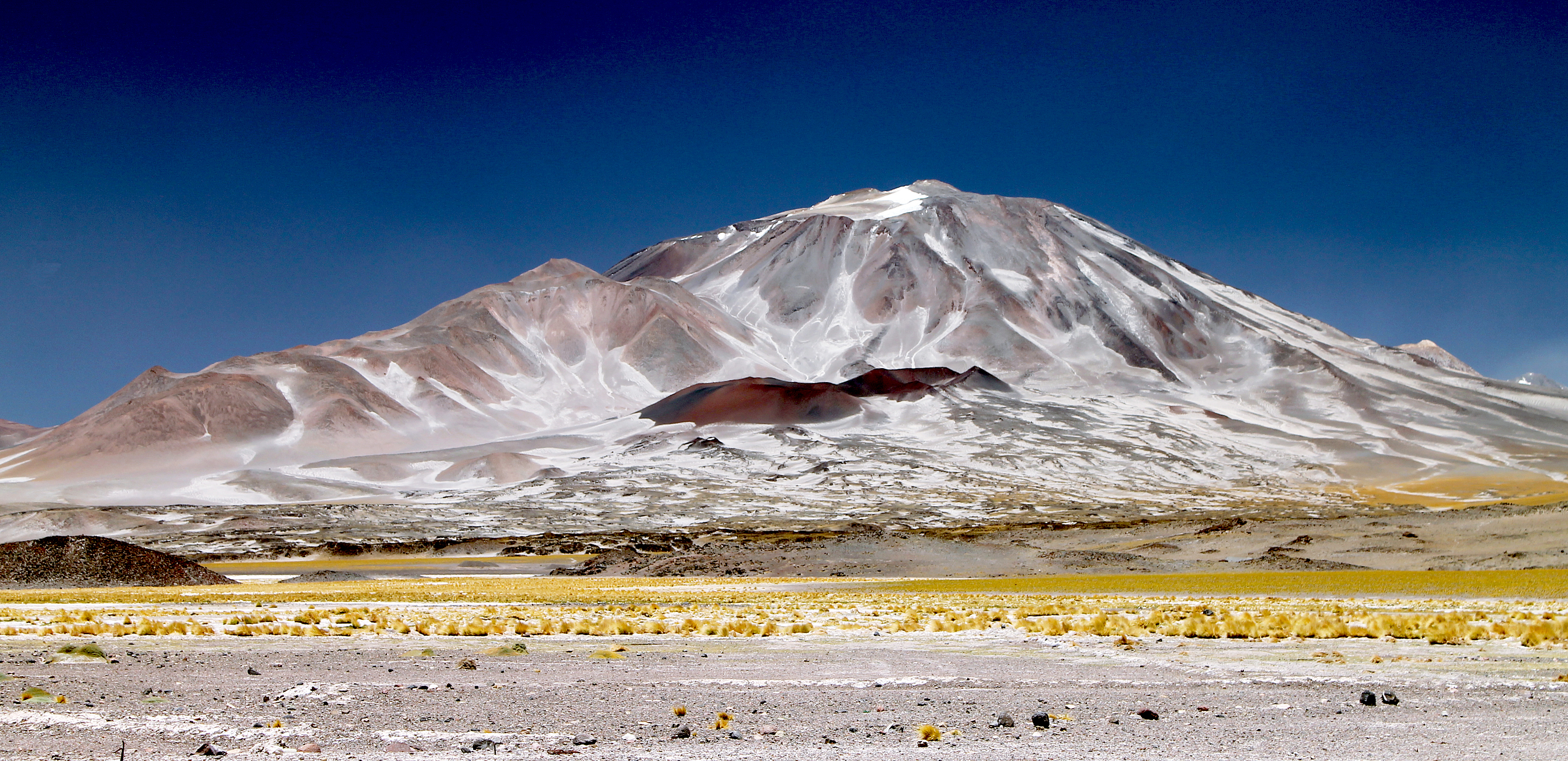
Incahuasi from Las Grutas. The eastern lava domes and the northeastern monogenetic volcanoes are clearly visible.

=== Composition ===
Like many Andean volcanoes, Incahuasi has erupted andesite containing hornblende and pyroxene, but also trachyandesite and trachydacite. Lava flows on the main stratovolcano are dacitic.

The four cones northeast of the principal volcano have erupted basaltic andesite. Likewise, parasitic cones have erupted magnesium-rich basaltic andesite. Minerals contained in these rocks include clinopyroxene and olivine.

The occurrence of such basic magmas in a volcanic setting dominated by dacites appears to be a consequence of local tectonics, which involve the extension of the crust compared to the compressional regime farther west. Originating in the mantle, the magmas quickly ascended in faults and were contaminated by crustal material. The mantle itself had been modified before by crustal material added by delamination of the lower crust and subduction erosion.

== Climate ==
Incahuasi does not have glaciers, but it does have at least temporary snowpack. Even the crater does not support the development of glaciers.

Average precipitation at Incahuasi is about 300–500 millimetres per year (12–20 in/year). The volcano lies south of the so-called "Arid Diagonal", and most precipitation falls during winter. This aridity is caused by the rain shadow effect of the Subandean Ranges, which block moisture from the Atlantic Ocean.

== Eruption history ==
One andesitic lava flow on the northwestern slope of Incahuasi has yielded two ages, one of 1.15 ± 0.5 million years ago and another of 710,000 ± 80,000 years ago. Based on their preservations, the lava flows appear to be of roughly comparable ages. Additional ages were obtained on the main edifice, 1.57 ± 0.1 million years ago, 1.14 ± 0.37 million years ago, and 1.00 ± 0.13 million years ago.

Parasitic cones were active over 500,000 years ago. These include the lava dome and lava flow fields (760,000 ± 90,000 and 740,000 ± 50,000 years ago, respectively) and a lava flow from the pyroclastic cones, which has been dated to 350,000 ± 30,000 years ago.

Volcanic activity at Incahuasi may have continued into the Holocene, considering the young appearance of its eruption products such as lava flows in the summit region and on the southern slopes; the old ages obtained by radiometric dating indicate an extinct volcano, although activity at Andean volcanoes is known to occur with long rest phases between eruptions (reaching one million years). There are reports of fumarolic activity. The volcano is considered a potential geological hazard to Argentina and Chile, where the SERNAGEOMIN hazard maps identify it as a potential threat. The remoteness of the volcano means that future eruptions are unlikely to impact populated areas, however, other than International Route CH-31. It was rated 27th out of 38 Argentine-Chilean volcanoes in dangerousness.

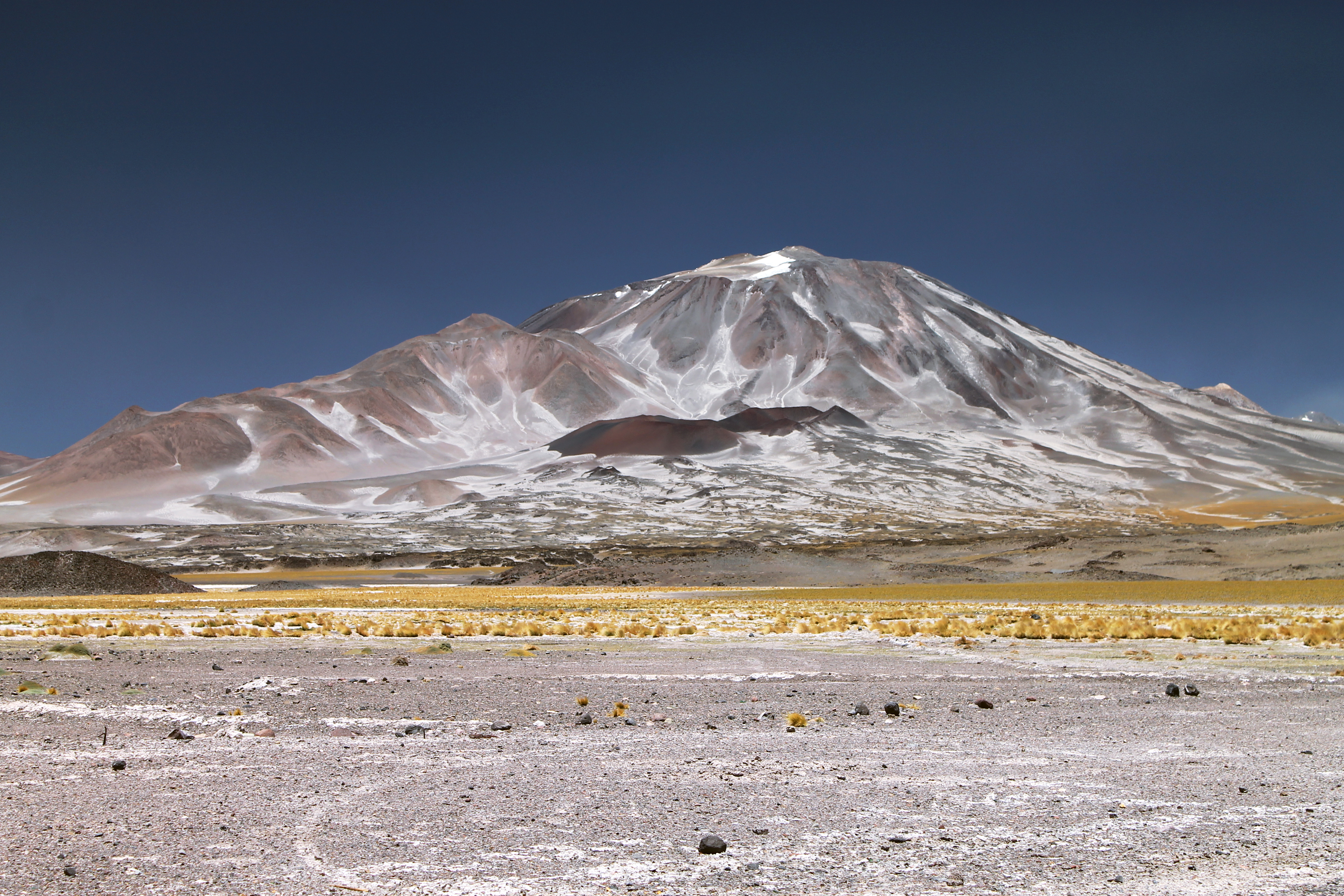
View from Las Grutas

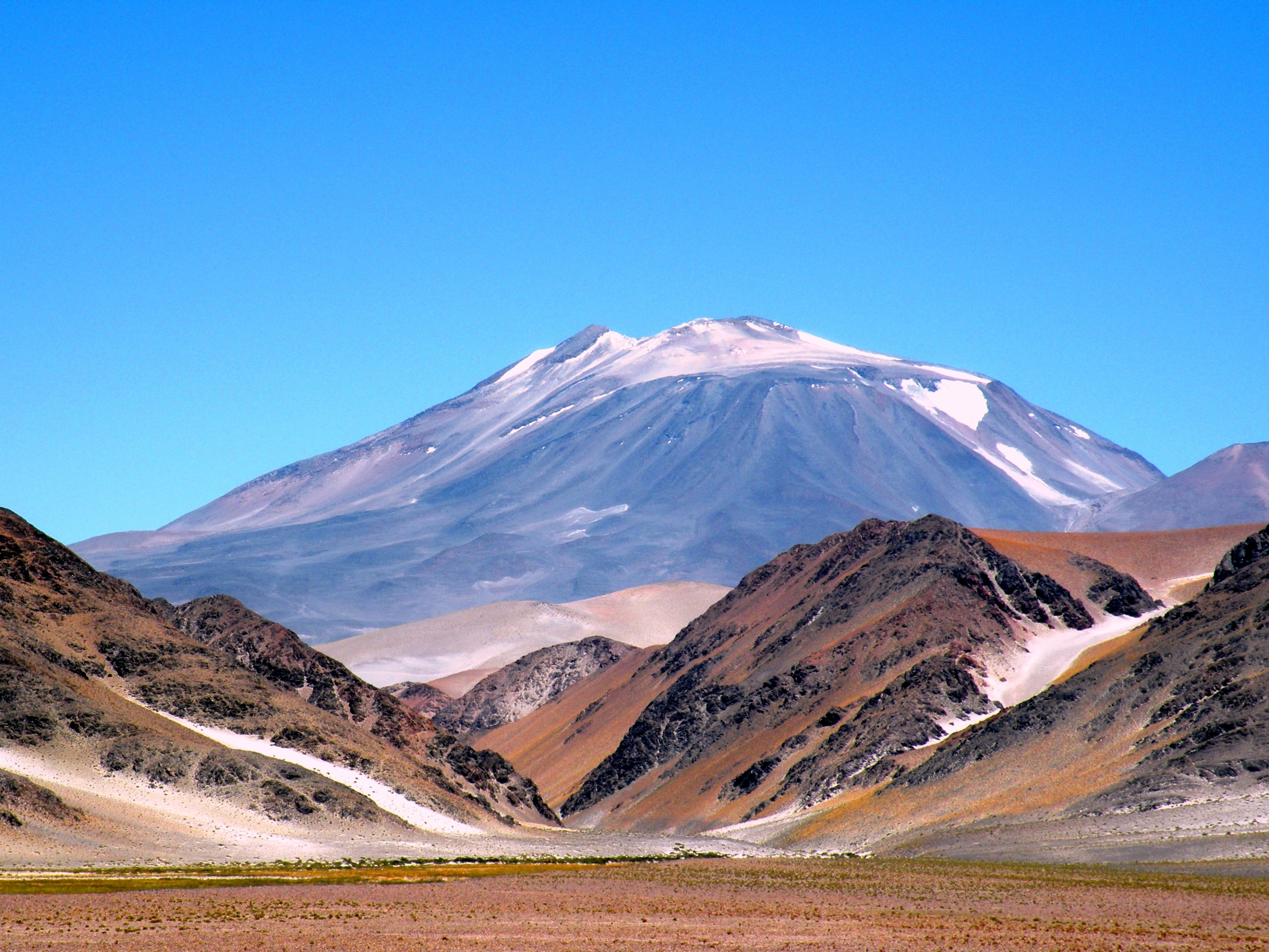

== Climbing history ==
The mountain was first climbed by Inca people. In 1912, Walter Penck climbed the mountain. Legend has it that a railway engineer named Edward Flint ascended the mountain between 1854 and 1859.

== Archaeology ==
In 1913, an Inca ceremonial structure was found on the summit of Incahuasi. Another archaeological site, "Fiambalá-1", lies at its foot. Other Inca archaeological sites in the region appear to have had functions correlated to that of the Incahuasi site.

== See also ==
- List of volcanoes in Chile
- List of volcanoes in Argentina
- List of Ultras of South America
- Ojos del Salado
- Nevado Tres Cruces
- Cerro El Muerto
