= Nevado Tres Cruces =

Volcanic massif in the Andes

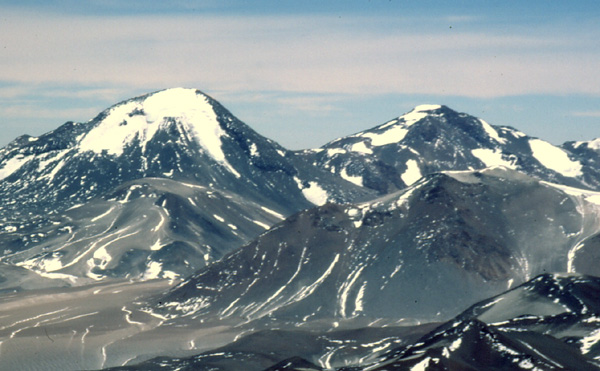
- Tres Cruces from Ojos del Salado to the east. The higher south summit is on the left, the central summit on the right.

Highest point
- Elevation: 6,748 m (22,139 ft)
- Prominence: 1,424 m (4,672 ft)Peakbagger
- Coordinates: 27.08°S 68.8°W

Geography
- Location within Chile

Geology
- Rock age: Pleistocene

Nevado Tres Cruces is a massif of volcanic origin in the Andes Mountains on the border of Argentina and Chile. It has two main summits, Tres Cruces Sur at 6,748 metres (22,139 ft) and Tres Cruces Centro at 6,629 m (21,749 ft) and a third minor summit, Tres Cruces Norte 6,030 m (19,780 ft). Tres Cruces Sur is the sixth highest mountain in the Andes.

The volcano has an extended history of activity, going back at least 1.5 million years. A number of lava domes surround the complex and a number of craters lie on its summits. The main volcano is of rhyodacitic composition and has generated two major ignimbritic eruptions, one 1.5 million years ago and a second 67,000 years ago. The last eruption was 28,000 years ago, but the volcano is a candidate source for a Holocene eruption and could erupt again in the future.

== Geography and geomorphology ==
Nevado Tres Cruces is located in the High Andes of Copiapo and straddles the boundary between Chile (Atacama Region) and Argentina (Catamarca Province). The Salar de Maricunga is located west of Nevado Tres Cruces, the Almagro valley north and its tributary the Barrancas Blancas valley northeast of it. The international road between Chile and Argentina from Paso de San Francisco passes north of Nevado Tres Cruces; an unpaved road runs through the Barrancas Blancas valley. The Rio Lomas and Rio Salado originate from its southwestern and southeastern flanks, respectively.

The volcano is massive, covering an area of about 1,000 square kilometres (390 sq mi), and consists of a 10 kilometres (6.2 mi) long and 5 kilometres (3.1 mi) wide north-south trending chain made up of at least three overlapping volcanoes. These volcanoes have diameters of 4–5 kilometres (2.5–3.1 mi) and rise about 800–1,600 metres (2,600–5,200 ft) above the surrounding terrain. The highest summit, and sixth-highest summit of South America, of Nevado Tres Cruces is the 6,748 metres (22,139 ft) high (Note: Other estimates are 6,330 metres (20,770 ft) and 6,620 metres (21,720 ft), and 6,030 metres (19,780 ft) for the northern summit. Owing to the region being extremely remote, elevations are often uncertain.) southern summit, which is also the least eroded of the three volcanoes that make up Nevado Tres Cruces. The southern summit consists of two overlapping cones, the western and older one of which has two explosion craters while the eastern one is capped by a summit lava dome. The central volcano reaches an elevation of 6,629 metres (21,749 ft), has the steepest slopes and is tilted to the west. The northern volcano has a summit elevation of 6,206 metres (20,361 ft) and is capped by a glacially eroded, 1 kilometre (0.62 mi) wide crater. There are two even more minor summits at the north end of the massif, Punta Torre 6,320 m (20,730 ft) and Punta Atacama 6,206 m (20,361 ft).

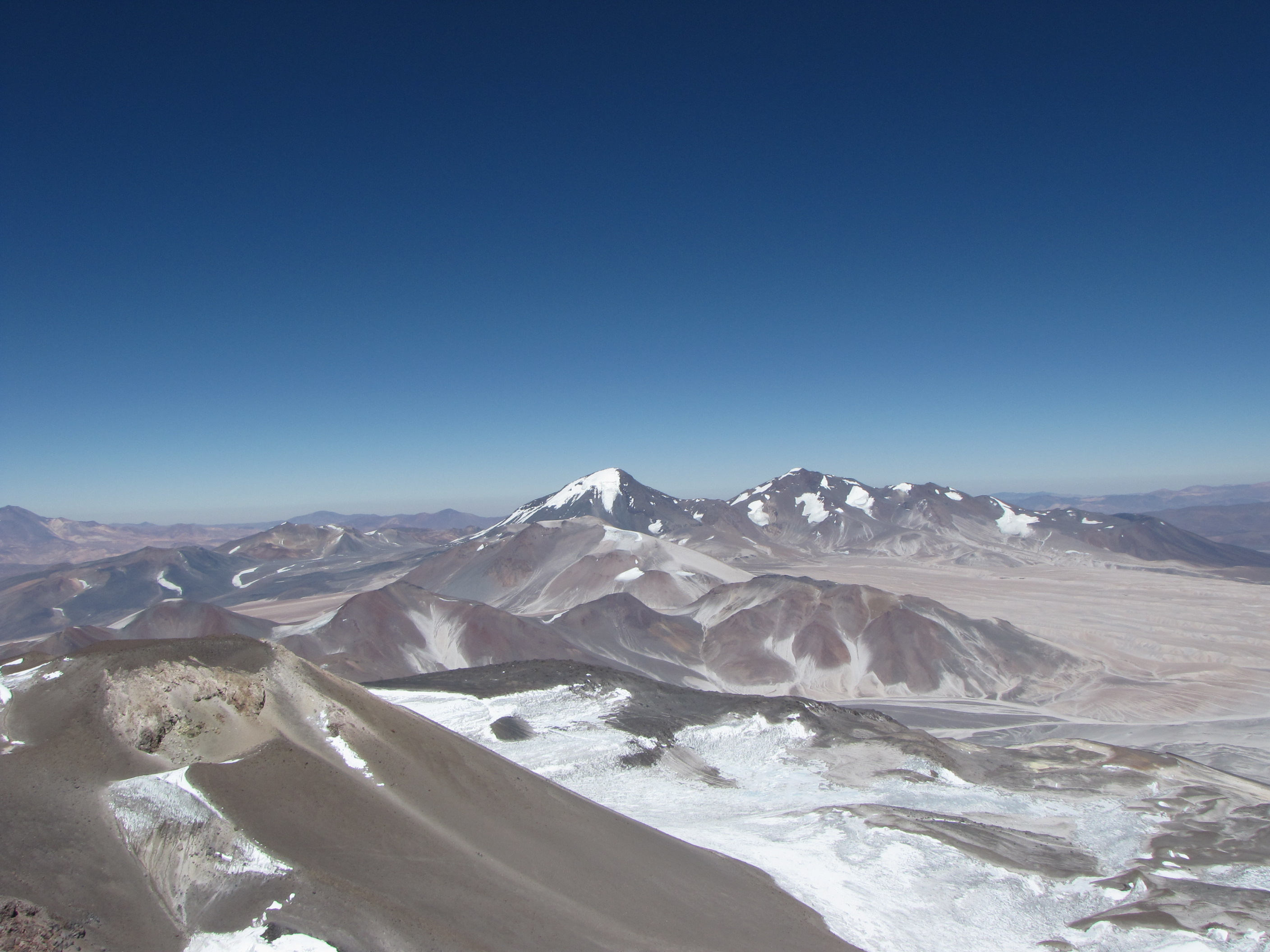

The volcanoes are formed by explosion craters, lava domes including couleés, lava flows, tephra, and base surge and pyroclastic flow deposits. Fallout of explosive eruptions covers the slopes of the southern summit and deposits of a large Plinian eruption and its eruption column cover much of Nevado Tres Cruces and its surroundings. Normal faults (Note: A normal fault is an usually steep fault where the hanging wall is moving downward with respect to the footwall.) cut across the volcanic structures and a north-northwest trending fault system appears to have directed the development of the three volcanoes.

Domo del Indio on the southeastern flank is 3.2 by 1.8 kilometres (2.0 mi × 1.1 mi) wide and 235 metres (771 ft) high. Between it and Nevado Tres Cruces lies a 2 by 1.5 kilometres (1.24 mi × 0.93 mi) wide and 150 metres (490 ft) deep explosion crater that contains the La Espinilla dome, which is 45 metres (148 ft) high and 200–250 metres (660–820 ft) wide. Another lava dome is known as Domo las Vicuñas. The Tres Cruces Ignimbrite was erupted by Nevado Tres Cruces and lies between Nevado Tres Cruces and Ojos del Salado and reaches a thickness of 100 metres (330 ft). It covers a surface area of 81.31 square kilometres (31.39 sq mi). The ignimbrite consists of pumice and volcanic ash, is poorly welded and has a low crystal content.

These edifices rise over older volcanoes, which crop out north of Nevado Tres Cruces in the form of the volcanoes Cristi (5,900 metres (19,400 ft) high), Lemp and Rodrigo. The latter has a caldera at 5,950 metres (19,520 ft) elevation. Lemp is located just south of Rodrigo. Puntiagudo crops out south of Nevado Tres Cruces. Two other centres lie on the southwestern foot: 5,194 metres (17,041 ft) high Paitur and 5,361 metres (17,589 ft) Trioblite. The older structures are smoothened by erosion and lack primary features. A thick and large lava flow crops out west of the volcano; it has a surface area of 3.5 by 5.5 square kilometres (1.4 sq mi × 2.1 sq mi) and a thickness of 150–200 metres (490–660 ft). Three older lava domes, all heavily eroded, are found on the western flank.

=== Glaciation ===
Small glaciers occur on Nevado Tres Cruces on the eastern and southern sides above 5,500 metres (18,000 ft) elevation. They are best developed above 5,750 metres (18,860 ft) elevation and consist of small ice bodies (none exceeding 1 square kilometre (0.39 sq mi)) in glacial cirques and at the edges of lava flows. One of these is hosted in a cirque on the southeastern flank of the southern summit. Ice area was constant between 1937 and 1956 but declined by almost half between 1985 and 2016. Non-moving ice without crevasses has been found on the northern summit, and there are debris-covered glaciers on the volcanoes. Some sources however deny that any glacier occurs on Nevado Tres Cruces.

Moraines occur above 4,400 metres (14,400 ft) elevation and a well-developed terminal moraine at the foot of Nevado Tres Cruces, at 4,200 metres (13,800 ft) elevation, has been broken by the Lamas River. There are cirques at 5,500 metres (18,000 ft) on the eastern sides of Nevado Tres Cruces and traces of periglacial occur. Presently, the equilibrium line altitude lies at about 5,800 metres (19,000 ft); during the Last Glacial Maximum the equilibrium line altitude descended to 5,500 metres (18,000 ft).

== Geology ==
Off the western coast of South America, the Nazca Plate subducts into the Peru-Chile Trench underneath the South America Plate at a rate of 7–9 centimetres per year (2.8–3.5 in/year). The subduction has given rise to three volcanic belts in the Andes, from north to south these are the Northern Volcanic Zone, the Central Volcanic Zone (CVZ) and the Southern Volcanic Zone. These are separated by gaps where Pleistocene and Holocene volcanism is absent and where the downgoing plate sinks into the mantle at a shallow angle, squeezing out the overlying asthenosphere.

Nevado Tres Cruces is part of the CVZ, which spans Peru, Bolivia, Argentina and Chile and features over 1100 volcanoes. These old but uneroded volcanoes comprise both stratovolcanoes and lava dome complexes, as well as monogenetic volcanoes and calderas which have produced large ignimbrites. Among the better known volcanoes are Acamarachi, Aguas Calientes, Arintica, Aucanquilcha, Cerro Bajo, Cerro Escorial, Chiliques, Colachi, Cordon de Puntas Negras, Escalante, Guallatiri, Guayaques, Irruputuncu, Isluga, Lascar, Lastarria, Licancabur, Llullaillaco, Olca-Paruma, Ollagüe, Ojos del Salado, Parinacota, Pular, Putana, San Pedro, Sierra Nevada de Lagunas Bravas, Socompa, Taapaca and Tacora. These volcanoes are remote and thus, aside from potential impacts of ash clouds on aerial travel, they do not constitute a major threat to humans.

Nevado Tres Cruces together with neighbouring El Fraile, El Muertito, El Muerto, El Solo, Nevado de Incahuasi, Nevado San Francisco and Ojos del Salado forms the Ojos del Salado volcanic chain. It is a group of mostly dacitic volcanoes that is oblique with respect to the local trend of Pleistocene-Holocene volcanoes and was active during the last one million years. During the Oligocene and Miocene volcanic activity occurred in the Maricunga Belt, then around 6 million years ago it migrated eastward. South of Nevado Tres Cruces lies the Los Patos volcano.

=== Composition ===
Nevado Tres Cruces has erupted rocks ranging from dacite to rhyodacite which define a potassium-rich calc-alkaline suite. They feature biotite and hornblende phenocrysts and there is evidence that magma mixing took place during the genesis of the magmas. Older volcanic rocks are andesites with clinopyroxene, hornblende, labradorite and orthopyroxene as phenocryst phases. The occurrence of obsidian has been reported but was not exploited in prehistoric times.

== Climate and vegetation ==
Strong winds, intense insolation, high diurnal and seasonal temperature variations characterize the region. At high elevations, precipitation falls mainly in winter in the form of snow and hail. The lack of visible life in the hyperarid region has led to numerous travellers deeming it a "lunar landscape". There are wetlands associated with the Rio Lamas on Nevado Tres Cruces. The area is part of the Nevado Tres Cruces National Park created in 1994.

== Human history ==
The volcano was climbed on February 24, 1937, by members of the Second Polish Andean Expedition, Stefan Osiecki and Witold Paryski. Indian mountaineer Malli Mastan Babu, the holder of the world record for climbing the Seven Summits in the shortest time span, also successfully summited this Nevado Tres Cruces in March 2015, but died during his descent due to bad weather on 24 March 2015.

== Eruption history ==
Nevado Tres Cruces was active during the Pliocene and Pleistocene, with the oldest activity pre-dating 1.5 million years ago. Potassium-argon dating has yielded ages of 3.4±0.5 and 4.9±0.4 million years ago. Rodrigo erupted 4.4±0.6 million years ago, Lemp 2.8±0.3 million years ago and Cristi 2.5±1.3 million years ago. The three western lava domes were emplaced 2.1±0.3 million years ago. The western lava flow is dated to be 1.4±0.4 million years old. The well-preserved Indio and La Espinilla lava domes were erupted 350,000±40,000 and 168,000±6,000 years ago, respectively. Volcanic activity took place in two stages separated by a long pause,. The time-averaged growth rate of 0.01–0.02 cubic kilometres per millennium (0.0024–0.0048 mi^{3}/ka) is slow for a volcano on a convergent margin.

1.5 million years ago an explosive eruption produced pyroclastic flows in the western part of the volcano. The flows are now covered with glacial and alluvial sediments and form a fan. A large explosive eruption 67,000±9,000 years ago deposited pyroclastic flows east and southeast of Nevado Tres Cruces. These pyroclastic flows form deposits extensive surrounding Ojos del Salado - to which they were originally attributed - and a 15 metres (49 ft) thick base surge deposit is also linked to this eruption. (Note: In light of the descriptions in Moreno and Gibbons 2007, Kay, Coira and Mpodozis 2008 and Rubiolo et al. 2003 this eruption appears to be the source of the Tres Cruces Ignimbrite. Other dates for that ignimbrite, obtained by argon-argon dating, are 190,000±30,000, 520,000±150,000 and 520,000±70,000 years ago.)

=== Most recent eruption and hazards ===
The last eruption 28,000±22,000 years ago produced the summit dome of the southern summit. There are no known historical eruptions and the volcano is not considered to be active. In light of the long repose periods relative to the date of the last eruption, future eruptions are possible but are unlikely to have high impact, as there is virtually no infrastructure in the region other than the International Route CH-31.

Based on geochemical data, Nevado Tres Cruces has been proposed as the source of a tephra layer in the Bolson de Fiambalá that has also been identified in the Tafi del Valle area and the Valles Calchaquies. The eruption producing this tephra fall took place about 600-700 AD. Archeological and vegetation studies observations in the Fiambalá region indicates that this tephra fall event had substantial impact on local communities and vegetation. However, the last securely dated eruption of Nevado Tres Cruces goes back to 67,000 years ago, making a correlation questionable.
