= Frail =

Frail may refer to:

- Frail (band), a Finnish rock band
- Frail (Maria Solheim album), a 2004 album by Norwegian artist Maria Solheim
- Frail (Jars of Clay album), a 1994 demo album by Christian rock band Jars of Clay
- "Frail" (Jars of Clay song), 1987
- "Frail" (Crystal Castles song), 2015

== People with the surname ==
- Dale Frail, Canadian astronomer
- Joe Frail (1869–1939), English footballer
- John Frail (died 1915), Scottish footballer
- Stephen Frail (born 1969), Scottish football manager

== See also ==
- Clawhammer, a banjo playing style
- Frailty (disambiguation)
- Fraile (disambiguation)
- Frailes (disambiguation)
