= Fraile =

Fraile is Spanish for friar and may refer to:

== People ==
- Alfonso Fraile, Spanish painter
- Francisco Fraile, Mexican politician
- Gorka Fraile, Spanish tennis player
- Hugo Fraile, Spanish footballer
- Luis Fraile, Spanish artist
- Omar Fraile, Spanish cyclist
- Susana Fraile, Spanish handball player

== Places ==
- Fraile, Culebra, Puerto Rico, a barrio of the island-municipality of Culebra

== See also ==
- Frailes (disambiguation)
- El Fraile (disambiguation)
- Frail (disambiguation)
