= El Fraile =

El Fraile (Spanish: The Friar) refers to:

- El Fraile (Sierra del Cabo de Gata), the highest peak in the Sierra del Cabo de Gata, Spain
- Fort Drum (El Fraile Island), a fortified island in the Philippines
- Nevado El Fraile, a high volcanic peak in the Andes, Chile

== See also ==
- Fraile (disambiguation)
