= Frailty =

Frailty may refer to:

== Film ==
- Frailty (1921 film), a British silent drama film
- Frailty (2001 film), an American-Canadian psychological horror film

== Music ==
- Frailty (band), a Latvian death-doom metal band formed in 2003
- Frailty (The Banner album), 2008
- Frailty (Jane Remover album), 2021
- Frailty, an album by the Duskfall, 2002

== Health and medicine ==
- Frailty index, a measure of the health status of older individuals
- Frailty syndrome, a collection of medical symptoms

== See also ==
- Frail (disambiguation)
- Frailing or clawhammer, a banjo playing style
