= San Francisco Pass =

Andes mountain pass connecting Argentina and Chile

Paso de San Francisco
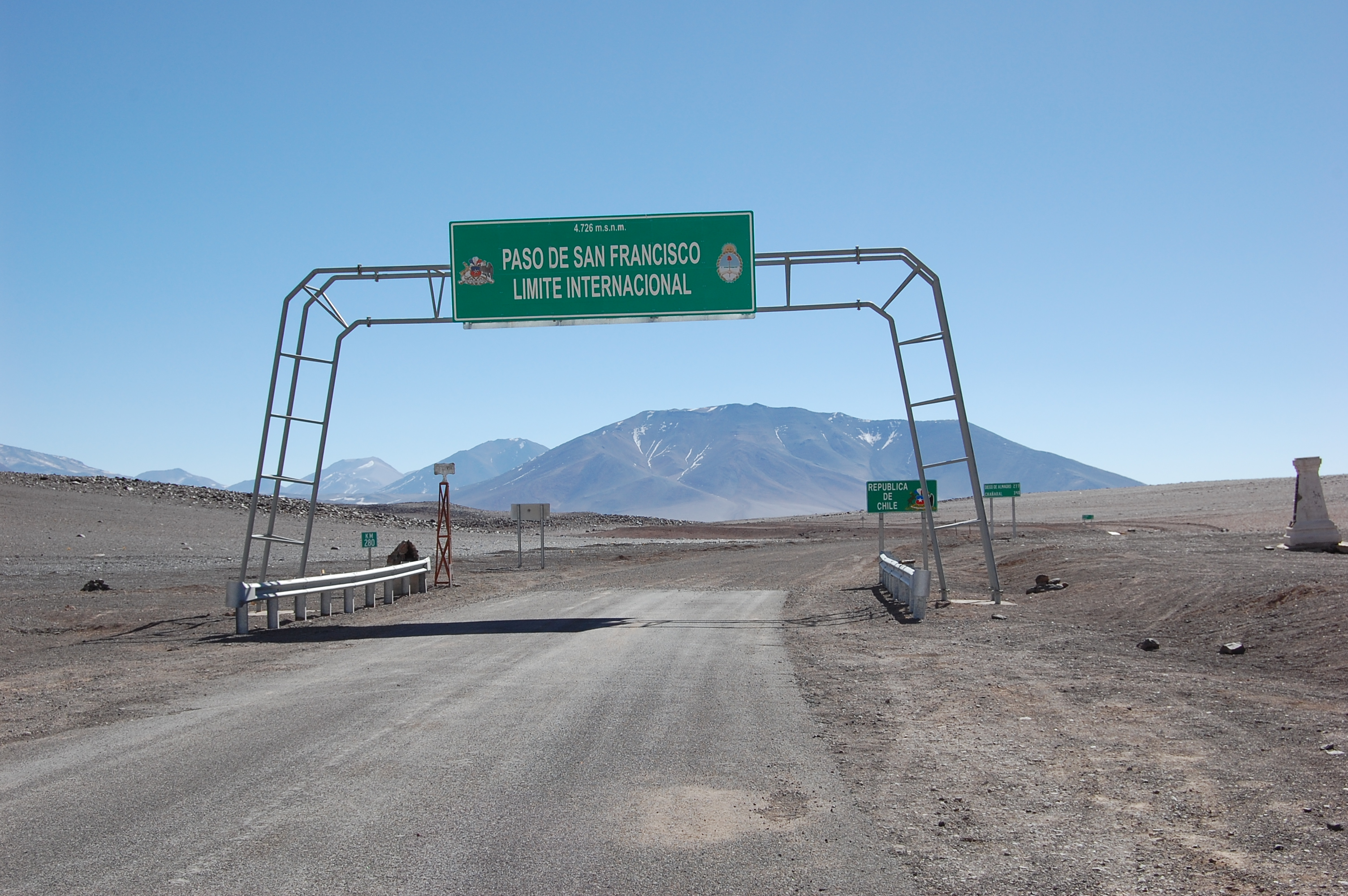

- Location within Argentina
- Elevation: 4,726 metres (15,505 ft)

Third Approach
- Location: Argentina–Chile border
- Range: Andes
- Coordinates: 26°52′35″S 68°18′05″W

The San Francisco Pass is a pass over the Andes Mountains which connects Argentina and Chile. The highest point of this pass is at 4,726 m (15,505 ft) AMSL.

The pass is historically significant as it is through this pass that Diego de Almagro's expedition is generally thought to have used to enter the territory of present-day Chile in early 1536. An alternative view is that the pass used by Almagro's party is that of Pircas Negras.

== Location ==
The pass is located at 26°52′35″S 68°18′05″W and connects the Argentine province of Catamarca with the Atacama Region in Chile. In the Argentine side, route N 60 ascends from Fiambala at 1,505 m (4,938 ft) AMSL in a deep valley formed by 5,000-metre (16,000 ft) mountains. In the last sinuous 20 km (12 mi), the route climbs from about 4,000 m (13,000 ft) in Las grutas to more than 4,700 m (15,400 ft) at the border.

On the Chilean side the route CH-31 connects Copiapó with the Chilean–Argentine border. On the way it passes next to Maricunga's salt flat on the Nevado Tres Cruces National Park and Laguna Verde. The area is surrounded by volcanoes and high peaks as the Cerro Falso Azufre (5,906 m or 19,377 ft), the volcano San Francisco (6,018 m or 19,744 ft), the Incahuasi (6,638 m or 21,778 ft) and highest volcano in the world, Nevado Ojos del Salado (6,879 m or 22,569 ft), among others.

== Gallery ==
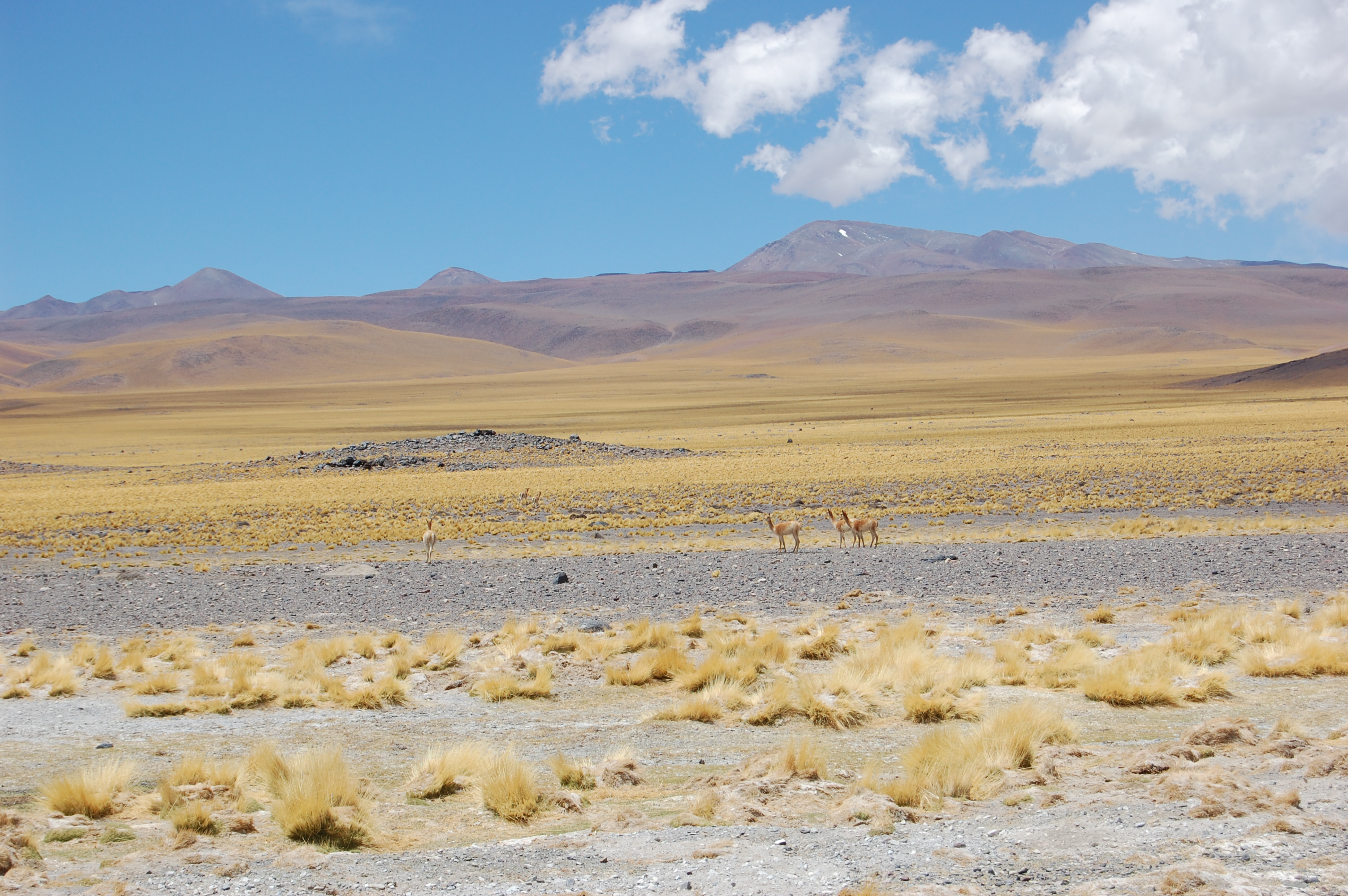

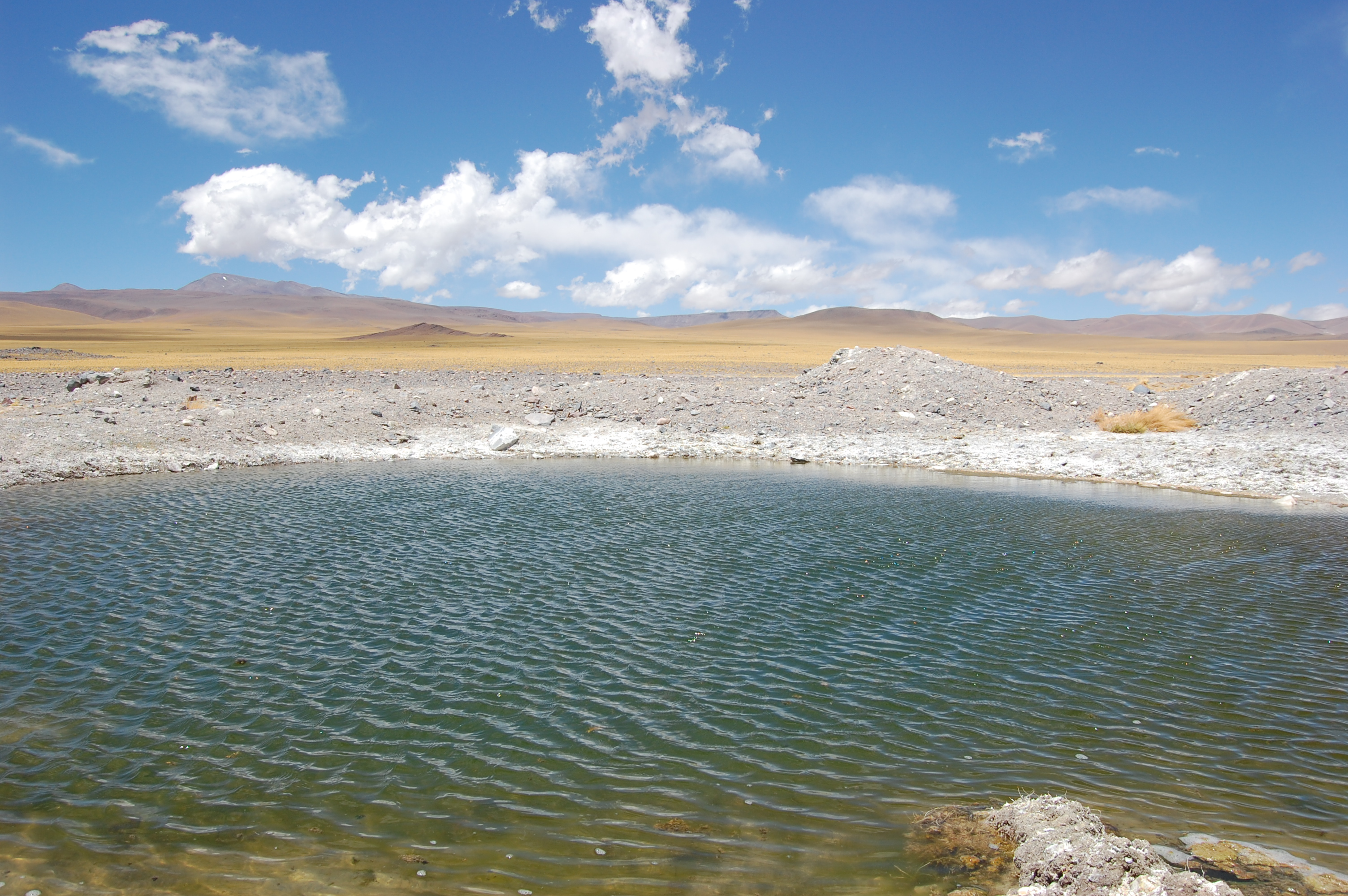

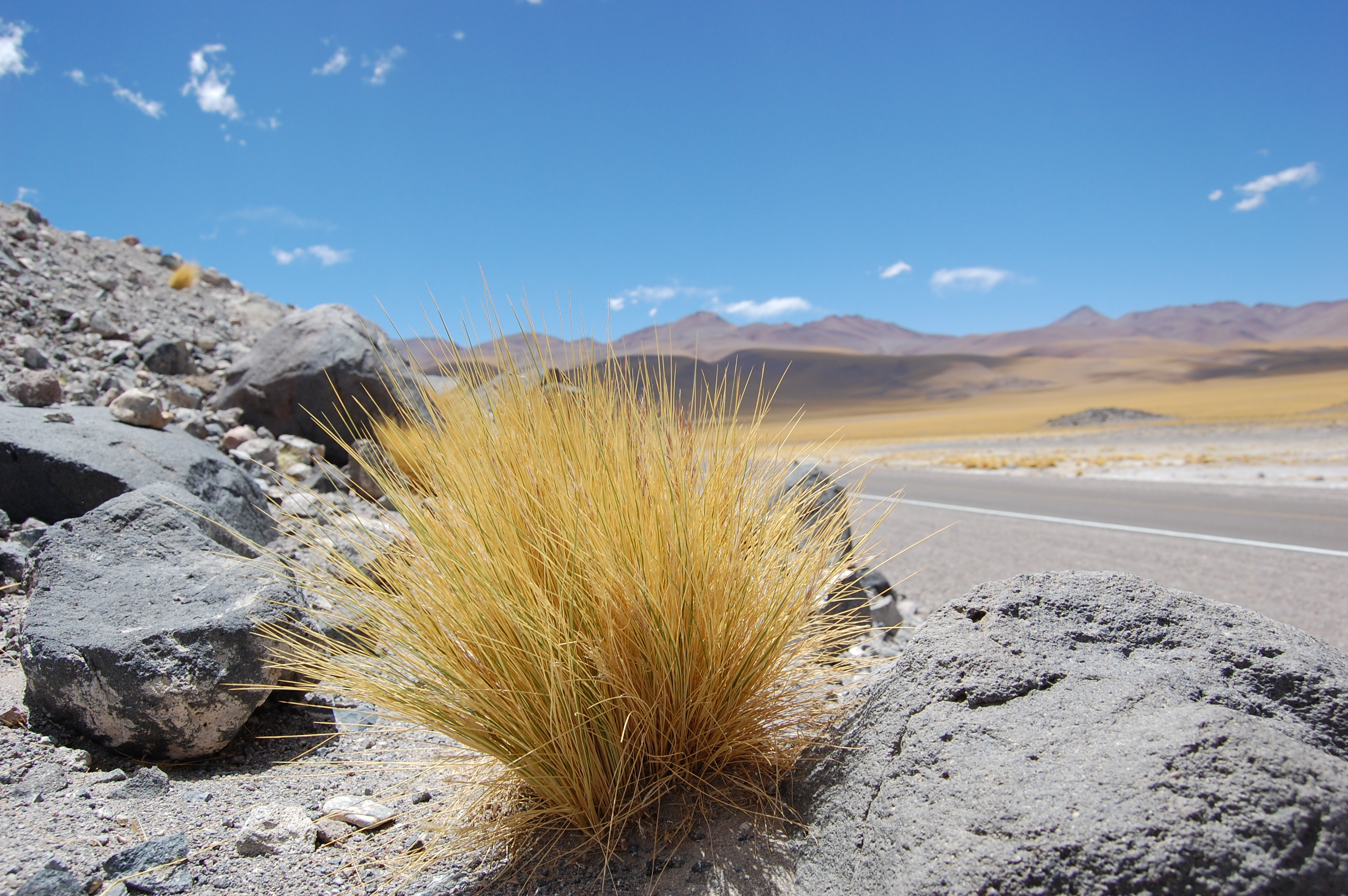

== See also ==
- Cerro Torta
- Laguna Verde (Chile)
