= Laguna Verde (lake of Chile) =

Salt lake in the Andes Mountains of Chile

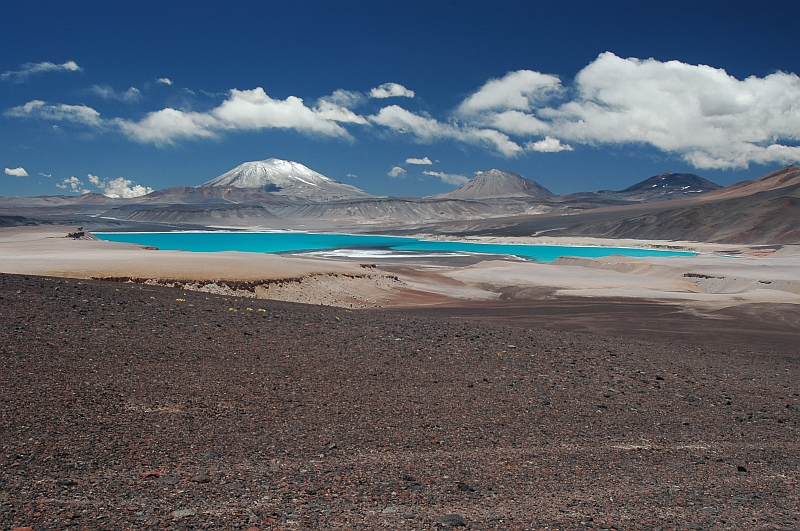
- Laguna Verde in front of volcanoes Incahuasi (most left) and El Fraile (right beside)

- Location within Chile
- Coordinates: 26°53′S 68°28′W
- Catchment area: 1,075 km^{2} (415 sq mi)
- Basin countries: Chile
- Surface area: 15 km^{2} (5.8 sq mi)
- Surface elevation: 14,200 feet (4,328 m)

Laguna Verde (Spanish for "green lake" or "green lagoon") is a salt lake in the Andes Mountains of Chile. It lies in the Atacama Region (third region), near San Francisco Pass. The stratovolcano Ojos del Salado, on the border with Argentina, marks the south border of its basin.

High mountains surround the lake. Among them are El Muerto, Incahuasi, Falso Azufre, Peña Blanca, Barrancas Blancas, El Ermitaño, Vicuñas and the already mentioned Ojos del Salado, the highest active volcano in the world.

== See also ==
- Nevado Tres Cruces National Park
- Copiapó
- Atacama Desert
