= Nevado El Fraile =

Mountain in Chile

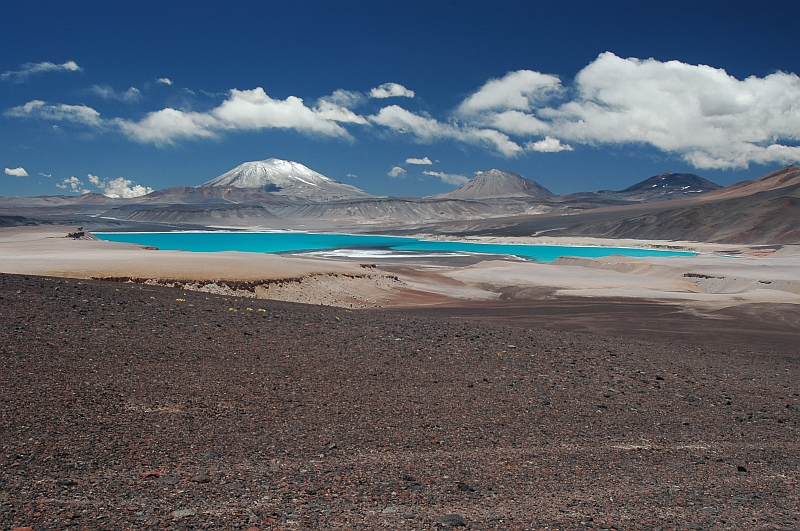
- Incahuasi at left and El Fraile is at center-right

Highest point
- Elevation: 6,061 m (19,885 ft)
- Prominence: 811 m (2,661 ft)
- Parent peak: Ojos del Salado
- Coordinates: 27°02′33″S 68°22′54″W

Geography
- Location within Chile
- Location: Chile
- Parent range: Andes

Climbing
- First ascent: 02/01/1956 - Anders Bolinder (Sweden)
- Easiest route: Scramble

Nevado El Fraile also called Incahuasi Chico (6,061 metres (19,885 ft)) (the Friar) is a volcanic mountain in the Andes of Chile. It sits at the border of Argentina (Catamarca Province, Fiambala) and Chile (City and Province of Copiapó). Along with numerous other volcanic peaks in the region, including Ojos del Salado, the highest volcano in the world, it is part of the Central Volcanic Zone. The closest higher peak is Incahuasi, which is 7.9 kilometres (4.9 mi) to the east.

== First Ascent ==
Fraile was first climbed by Anders Bolinder (Sweden) January 2, 1956.

== Elevation ==
Other data from available digital elevation models: SRTM yields 6048 metres, ASTER 6024 metres, ALOS 6024 metres and TanDEM-X 6091 metres. The height of the nearest key col is 5260 meters, leading to a topographic prominence of 801 meters. Fraile is considered a Mountain Subgroup according to the Dominance System and its dominance is 13.22%. Its parent peak is Ojos del Salado and the Topographic isolation is 17.4 kilometers.
