= Ojos del Salado =

Earth's highest volcano

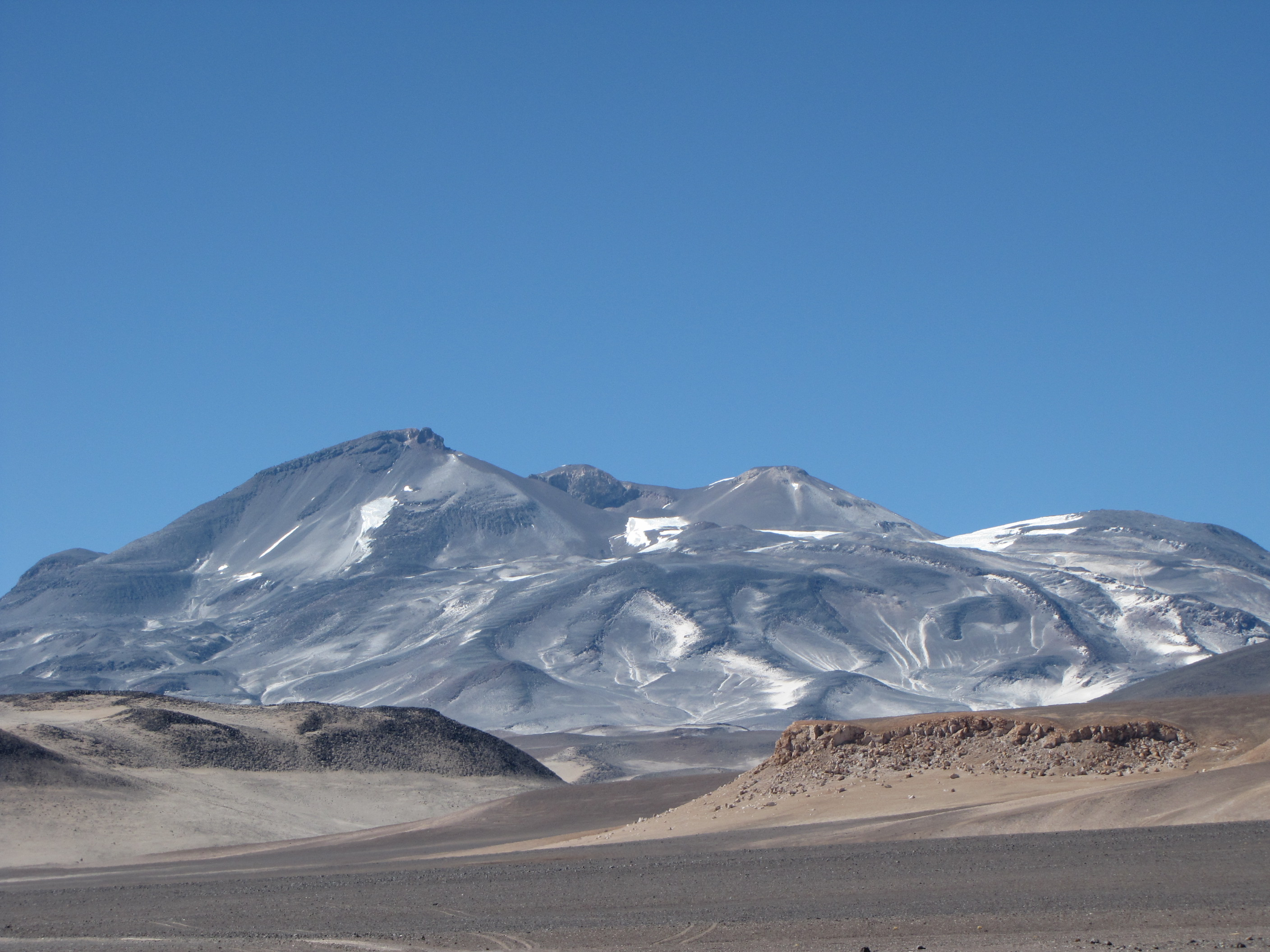

Highest point
- Elevation: 6,893 m (22,615 ft)
- Prominence: 3,688 m (12,100 ft); Ranked 44th
- Parent peak: Aconcagua
- Isolation: 630.5 km (391.8 mi) to Aconcagua
- Listing: Volcanic Seven Summits; Seven Second Summits; Country high point Ultra
- Coordinates: 27°6′35″S 68°32′29″W

Geography
- Location within Chile
- Location: Argentina–Chile
- Parent range: Andes

Geology
- Mountain type: stratovolcano
- Last eruption: 750 CE ± 250 years

Climbing
- First ascent: February 26, 1937, by Jan Alfred Szczepański and Justyn Wojsznis
- Easiest route: Scramble

Nevado Ojos del Salado (Spanish pronunciation: [ˈoxos ðel saˈlaðo]) is a dormant complex volcano in the Andes on the Argentina–Chile border. It is the highest volcano on Earth and the highest peak in Chile. The upper reaches of Ojos del Salado consist of several overlapping lava domes, lava flows and volcanic craters, with sparse ice cover. The complex extends over an area of 70–160 square kilometres (27–62 mi^{2}) and its highest summit reaches an altitude of 6,893 metres (22,615 ft) above sea level. Numerous other volcanoes rise around Ojos del Salado.

Being close to the Arid Diagonal of South America, the mountain has extremely dry conditions, which prevent the formation of substantial glaciers and a permanent snow cover. Despite the arid climate, there is a permanent crater lake about 100 m (330 ft) in diameter at an elevation of 6,480–6,500 metres (21,260–21,330 ft) within the summit crater and east of the main summit. This is the highest lake of any kind in the world. Owing to its altitude and the desiccated climate, the mountain lacks vegetation.

Ojos del Salado was volcanically active during the Pleistocene (Note: The Pleistocene is the geological period between 2.58 million and 11,700 years ago.) and Holocene, (Note: The Holocene is the geological period between 11,700 years ago and today.) during which it mainly produced lava flows. Activity was in two phases and a depression or caldera formed in the course of its growth. The volcano was also affected by eruptions of its neighbour to the west, Nevado Tres Cruces. The last eruption of Ojos del Salado occurred around 750 CE; steam emissions observed in November 1993 may have constituted another eruptive event.

An international highway between Argentina and Chile crosses north of the mountain. Ojos del Salado can be ascended from both countries; the first ascent was made in 1937 by Jan Alfred Szczepański and Justyn Wojsznis, members of a Polish expedition in the Andes. During the middle of the 20th century there was a debate on whether Ojos del Salado or Aconcagua was the highest mountain in South America, which was eventually resolved in favour of Aconcagua.

== Name ==
The name Ojos del Salado refers to a river, Río Salado (Note: The river does not actually originate on Ojos del Salado; according to the Deutscher Alpenverein map from 2004, the Rio Salado originates next to Cerro Solo.) ("Salty River"), which was used by a 1937 Polish expedition to reach the mountain. It is unclear whether the name was already in use before by a Chile–Argentina boundary commission. In geographical terms, Ojo is commonly used in Chile and Argentina to denote a spring or source of water; e.g. the nearby source of the Las Lozas river "Ojo de las Lozas".

The mountain is often referred to as Cerro Ojos del Salado and Nevado Ojos del Salado; the former is a common term for "mountain" in Chile and the latter means "snowy", referring to snow-covered mountains. Another theory posits that the name means "salty eyes" or "salty springs", referring to mineral deposits on its flanks. There are two summits, known as the eastern or Argentine and western or Chilean summit; both lie along the international boundary and get their names after the country from which they can be more easily reached.

== Geography and geomorphology ==
Ojos del Salado is part of the High Andes and rises from the southern end of the Puna de Atacama, a high plateau next to the Atacama Desert with an average elevation of 4,000 metres (13,000 ft). The Argentina–Chile border runs across the summit of the mountain in an east-west direction. The Argentine part is within Catamarca Province and the Chilean in Copiapo Province of the Atacama Region. The highway Chile Route 31 runs between the city of Copiapo west of the volcano and the Paso San Francisco (Note: Paso San Francisco one of the most important crossings of the Andes with over 8,100 people crossing in 2018 when the road was paved.) to Argentina, lying about 20 kilometres (12 mi) north of the volcano, making it more accessible than many other volcanoes there. The region is uninhabited and lacks water resources; many parts are only accessible through dirt roads.

Ojos del Salado is a dormant volcano that rises to 6,893 metres (22,615 ft), 6,879 metres (22,569 ft) or 6,887 metres (22,595 ft) elevation. It is the world's highest volcano (Note: Relative to sea level; relative to base level Mauna Loa is considerably higher.) and the second-highest summit of the Andes, and the highest summit in Chile. Ojos del Salado is not a single conical summit but a massif/complex volcano formed by overlapping smaller volcanoes, with over 20 craters. Two edifices, less than 2.5 kilometres (1.6 mi) wide, flank the 1.3-by-0.5-kilometre-wide (0.81 mi × 0.31 mi) summit crater on its eastern and western side. Basalt, gravel, pumice and scoria crop out in its rim, which is lower on the northern side. A second 300–400-metre-wide (980–1,310 ft) crater lies just west of the summit crater. Reportedly, the summit is separated by a deep gap into two separate peaks. Thick short dacitic lava flows make up the core 13 by 12 kilometres (8.1 mi × 7.5 mi) area of the volcano but pyroclastic fall material covers much of the summit area.

The massif rises about 2 kilometres (1.2 mi) above the surrounding terrain and covers an oval area of about 70 square kilometres (27 sq mi)–160 square kilometres (62 sq mi), consisting of lava domes, lava flows, pyroclastic cones and volcanic craters that rise about 2 kilometres (1.2 mi) above the surrounding terrain. The massif appears to feature a buried caldera, visible through a slope break from the western side, and/or a 2.5-kilometre-wide (1.6 mi) depression. The occurrence of a rift-like structure with numerous small craters has also been reported. Volcanic cones form a north-northeast trending alignment on the western flank. Cerro Solo and El Fraile are large lava domes on the flanks of Ojos del Salado, and produced pyroclastic flows.

Wind-driven erosion has produced megaripple sand fields on the northern flank. Above 6,000 metres (20,000 ft) elevation talus-covered slopes and lava flows form the bulk of the surface, while the desert plains begin below 5,000 metres (16,000 ft) elevation. The ground above 4,000–5,600 metres (13,100–18,400 ft) elevation is expected to contain permafrost, which is likely continuous at higher elevations and overlaid with a thin active layer. Cryoturbation (Note: Cryoturbation landforms form when frost triggers deformation of the soil.) landforms were not conspicuous according to Nagy et al. 2019, presumably because wind-driven phenomena overprint the effects of cryoturbation. Mass movements have left traces on the mountain.

=== Lakes ===
Ojos del Salado hosts the highest lake in the world (Note: There are waterbodies at 6,600 metres (21,700 ft) elevation; if considered lakes, they may be the highest lakes in the world.) in the form of the crater lake in the summit crater. Fed by permafrost and snowfields, it lies at 6,480–6,500 metres (21,260–21,330 ft) elevation. It is surrounded by fumaroles and covers an area of 6,000 square metres (65,000 sq ft). Waters in a creek flowing into this lake reach temperatures of 40.8 °C (105.4 °F).

There are two lakes at 5,900 metres (19,400 ft) elevation on the northeastern slope, c. 4 kilometres (2.5 mi) away from the higher lake. Each has an area of 2,500 square metres (27,000 sq ft) and an estimated depth of 1 metre (3 ft 3 in). Ephemeral lakes (Note: An early report of such lakes goes back to 1937.) occur at 5,900–6,000 metres (19,400–19,700 ft) elevation, when meltwater from underground snow/ice and permafrost accumulates in closed depressions. Such ponds may form in depressions at 6,380 metres (20,930 ft) elevation. Some of the lakes may be permanently frozen. Lakes might disappear with climate change owing to the breakdown of permafrost. There are no permanent waterbodies, whether creeks or lakes, at low altitudes, except for Laguna Verde.

=== Surroundings ===
The landscape is dominated by volcanoes, many of Pleistocene or Holocene age, and is the highest volcanic region in the world. Young volcanoes have conical shapes and often feature summit craters. Travellers have called the region a "moonscape". There are hot springs in the region, such as the Termas Laguna Verde at the shores of Laguna Verde, which are frequented by visitors.

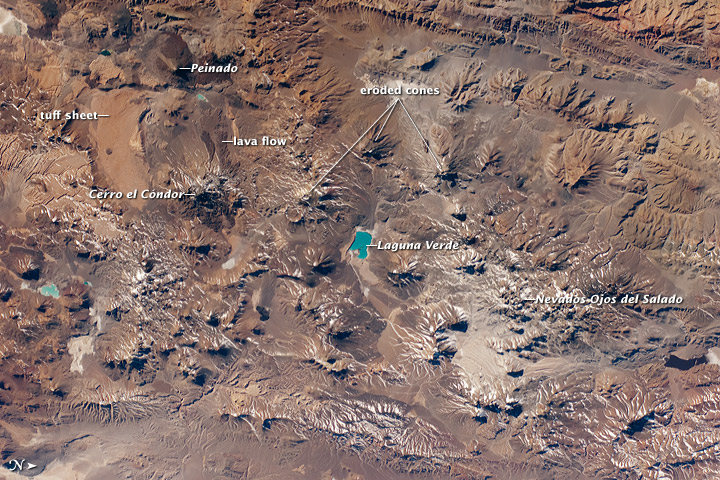
Volcanic landscapes of the Central Andes. Shown are Nevado Ojos del Salado, Cerro El Cóndor and Peinado, along the Argentina-Chile border. Astronaut photo from International Space Station, 2010.

The volcano lies in the middle of an over 80-kilometre (50 mi) long east–west trending chain of volcanoes that form a drainage divide and includes the volcanoes Nevado Tres Cruces, Incahuasi and Cerro Blanco. This chain of volcanoes appears to be part of the Ojos del Salado–San Buenaventura tectonic lineament, which corresponds to a geographic (southern boundary of the Puna de Atacama) and tectonic discontinuity in the region. The lineament may be a consequence of the subduction of the Copiapo Ridge at this latitude. An alternative view is that the subducting Copiapo Ridge is actually located north of the lineament; this would be more consistent with the theory that the subduction of such ridges gives rise to gaps in the volcanic chain.

== Ice and glaciers ==
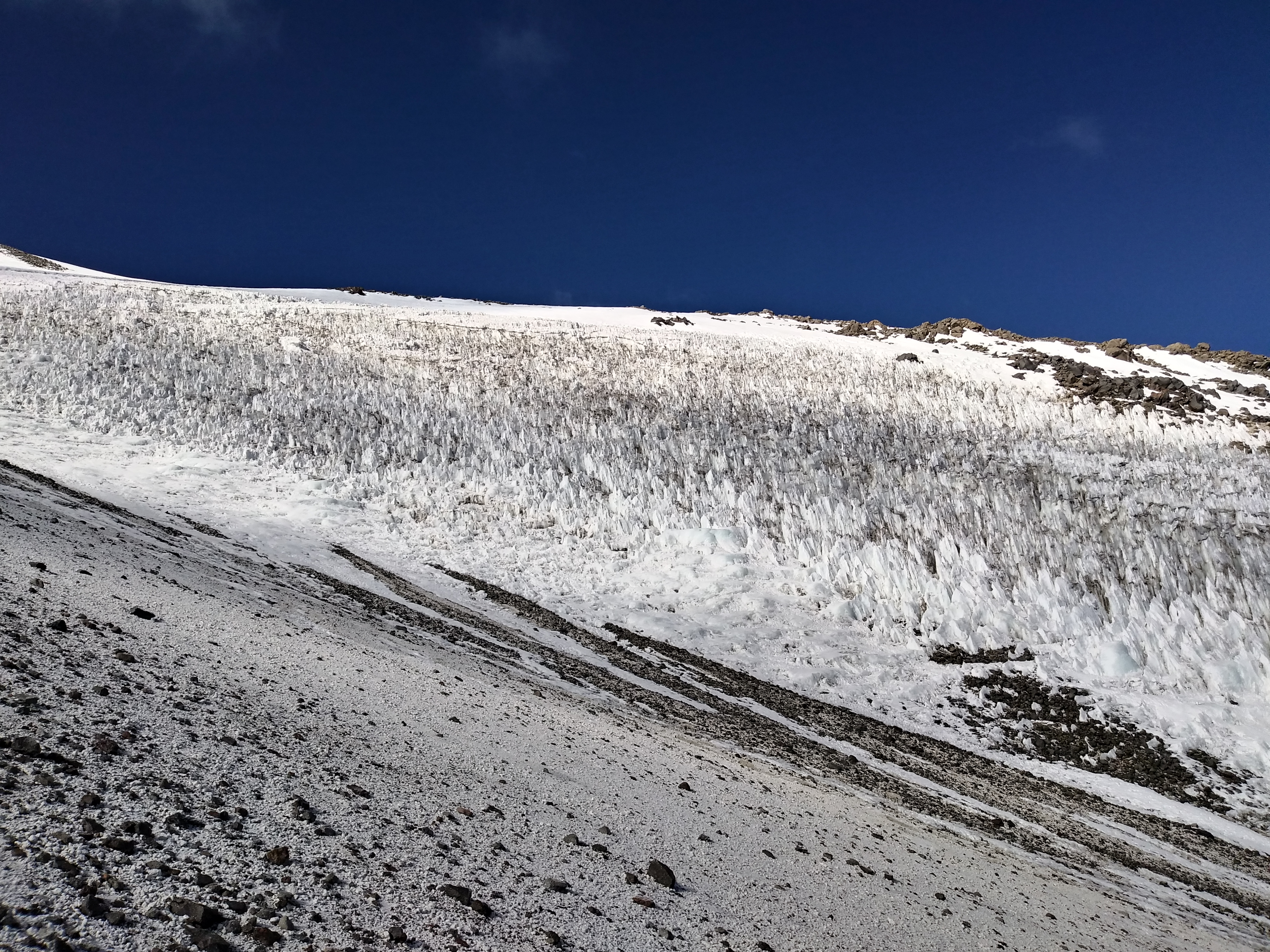
Penitente field at an altitude of approximately 6500 m on northern face of Ojos del Salado in February (summer) of 2020

Except for firn and small glaciers in sheltered parts of the mountain, Ojos del Salado lacks substantial ice cover. This is due to the arid climate of the region, which causes the equilibrium line altitude of ice to rise above the top of the mountain and keeps most peaks in the area ice-free. Only farther south at Tronquitos does more extensive glaciation begin. Temporary ice and snow accumulations can be mistaken for glaciers, and glacier areas shown on maps are often actually immobile firn fields. The ice reaches thicknesses of only 10–15 metres (33–49 ft) and areal extents of a few hundred metres. Meltwater feeds streams.

Climbing parties in 1956 reported two glaciers on the northwestern slope; a 1958 report indicated that an ice body at 6,600 metres (21,700 ft) elevation descends into two branches and is followed at lower elevation by another glacier also with two branches—but in neither case with any evidence of movement— and in 2014 there was ice in the summit crater and substantial glaciers on the eastern and southern slopes, which reached elevations below 6,000 metres (20,000 ft). There have been increases in ice area between 1974 and 1983, but between 1986 and 2000, ice area decreased by 40%. The melting of the ice is expected to produce an increased discharge at first, but eventually ice diminishes to the point that runoff will decline.

Penitentes have been encountered by climbers as early as 1937; in 1949 there were reportedly 5–8 metres (16–26 ft) high penitentes on Ojos del Salado. Penitentes are high ice spires which form when ice sublimates in the intense insolation.

=== Subsurface ice ===
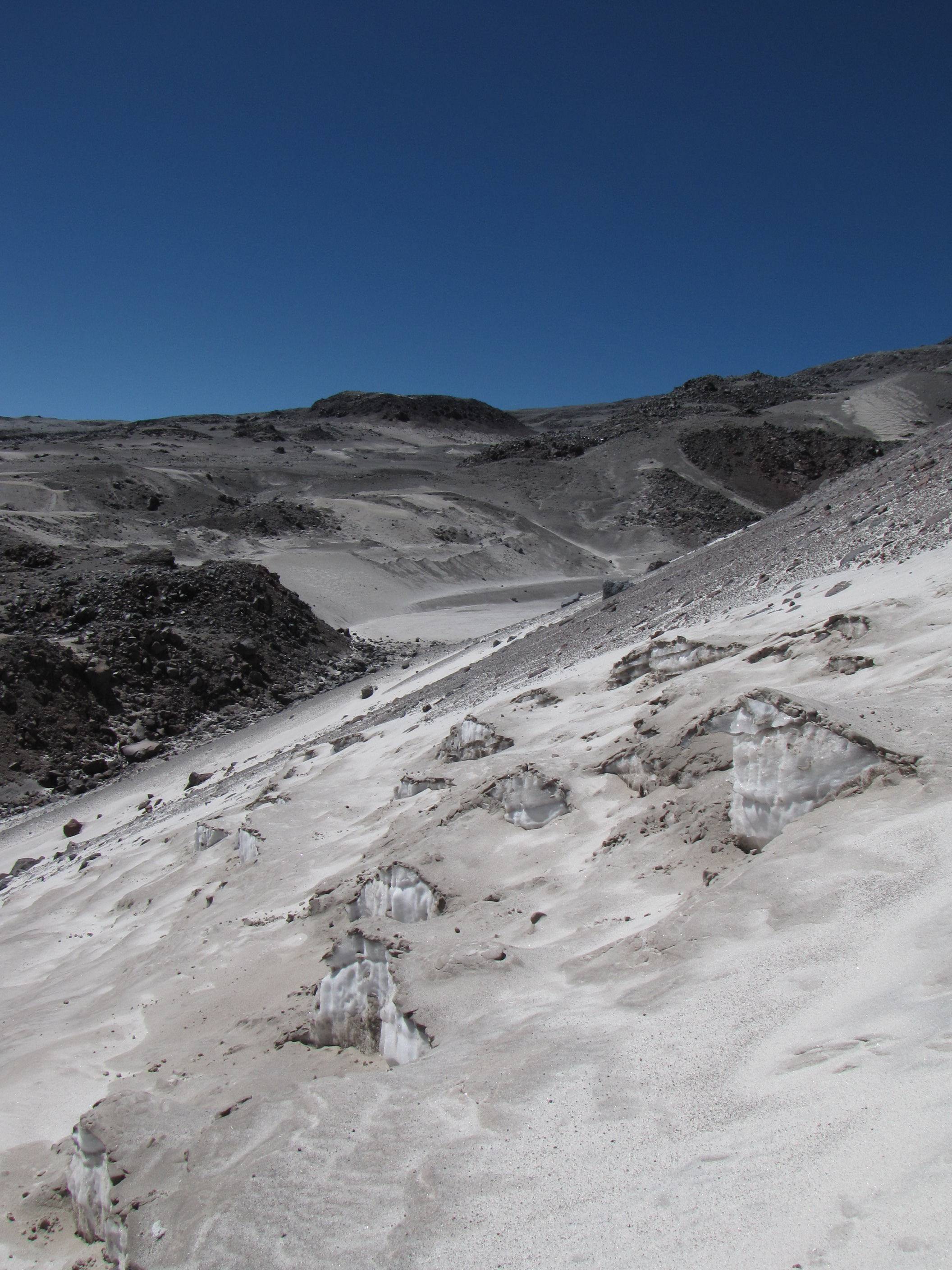
Ice buried beneath sand

Ice buried beneath sand and encased in moraines is more important than surface ice at Ojos del Salado. It is retreating, but the insulating effect of the cover slows the retreat. Cryokarst, erosional gullies and so-called "infilled valleys" (Note: Several metres wide valleys that are filled with erosion debris.) have been observed; they most likely form when buried ice and snow melt. There may be rock glaciers as well. The combined effect of erosion by the meltwater and the disappearance of ice volume creates cavities that collapse and form the valleys, pseudokarst landforms and dolines. Underground ice and permafrost vary in their properties depending on the altitude.

=== Past glaciation ===
Lateral moraines altered by wind erosion occur north of Ojos del Salado, and some lava flows bear traces of glaciation. Research published in 2019 and 2025 found cirques, trim lines and U-shaped valleys on Ojos del Salado. However, there is no evidence of Pleistocene glacier advances in the region nor any indication of a Pleistocene snowline, although cirques have been reported from Nevado Tres Cruces and some sources propose the existence of glaciers 19,000 years ago. The monsoon reached farther south during the Pleistocene but did not reach Ojos del Salado, allowing the development of glaciers only at more northern latitudes. Westerly winds did not regularly influence the climate at the volcano, either.

== Geology ==
In South America, there are about 200 volcanoes with evidence of eruptions during the Pleistocene and Holocene along the western coast, where the Nazca Plate and Antarctic Plate subduct beneath the South America Plate in the Peru-Chile Trench. Volcanic activity is localized in four major volcanic belts, the Northern, Central (CVZ), Southern and Austral Volcanic Zones; these are separated by belts without volcanic activity and form part of the Pacific Ring of Fire. Where volcanic activity occurs, the subduction process releases fluids from the downgoing slab which trigger the formation of melts in the mantle that eventually ascend to the surface and give rise to volcanism. (Note: Zentilli 1974 considered the volcano linked to the so-called "Easter Hot Line" of volcanoes but they do not have a common magma.)

The CVZ spans Peru, Bolivia, Chile and Argentina and contains about 1,100 recognized volcanoes, many of which are extremely old but are still recognizable owing to the low erosion rates in the region. Apart from stratovolcanoes, the CVZ includes numerous calderas, isolated lava domes and lava flows, maars and pyroclastic cones. Most of the volcanoes are remote and thus constitute a low hazard. Ojos del Salado is part of the CVZ and constitutes its southern boundary. (Note: Other Pliocene-recent volcanoes such as Cerro Bonete and Incapillo occur south of Ojos del Salado, but volcanoes there are more isolated and farther inland than these north of Ojos del Salado.) South of the volcano volcanism ceased during the last six million years, and until 32° south, subduction takes place at a shallow angle and volcanism is absent in the "Pampean flat-slab". The shallow angle may be a consequence of the subduction of submarine topography, such as the Copiapo Ridge at the northern end of the Juan Fernández Ridge at the southern margin of the gap.

=== Local ===
The basement in the region crops out in the Cordillera Claudio Gay area, and consists of sedimentary rocks of Devonian (Note: The Devonian is the geological period between 419.2 ±3.2 and 358.9 ±0.4 million years ago.)-Carboniferous (Note: The Carboniferous is the geological period between 358.9 ±0.4 and 298.9 ±0.15 million years ago.) age. The rocks are intruded by and covered by granites and rhyolites associated with Permian volcanic rocks and the Choiyoi Group. Oligocene (Note: The Oligocene is the geological period between 33.9 and 23.03 million years ago.) to recent volcanic rocks and volcano-sedimentary formations cover this basement. The topography at Ojos del Salado bears evidence of what may have been past magmatic uplift. Seismic tomography has yielded evidence of a low seismic velocity anomaly underneath the volcano that may constitute the pathway through which water emanating from the downgoing slab rises through the mantle and gives rise to melting.

Volcanism in the region commenced 26 million years ago, when the Farallon Plate broke up and subduction speed increased. Initially between 26 and 11 million years ago activity was concentrated in the Maricunga region 60 kilometres (37 mi) west of the Ojos del Salado region, where only small-volume volcanism took place and which constituted the back-arc to the Maricunga arc. Between 8–5 million years ago activity declined in the Maricunga region and increased in the Ojos del Salado region, until Maricunga volcanism ceased 4 million years ago. This shift coincided with a gradual flattening of the subduction process since the Miocene (Note: The Miocene is the geological period between 23.03 and 5.333 million years ago.) and was accompanied by change in crustal and mantle properties that are reflected in the isotope ratios of erupted volcanic rocks. During the Quaternary, volcanism formed the edifices of Cerro Solo, El Fraile, Incahuasi, El Muerto, El Muertito, Falso Azufre, Nevado San Francisco, Nevado Tres Cruces and Ojos del Salado, which together cover over half of the area. Apart from the large volcanoes, many smaller monogenetic volcanoes developed in the area, especially east of Ojos del Salado. Pleistocene volcanism was limited to the Ojos del Salado area, where recent faulting offset volcanic rocks. The large dimensions of Ojos del Salado indicate that magmatism was focused here.

=== Composition ===
Volcanic rocks erupted by Ojos del Salado form a calc-alkaline potassium-rich suite of dacitic rocks, with occasional andesite and rhyodacite. Earlier in the geological history of the region more mafic magmas also erupted. The rocks contain phenocrysts like augite, biotite, hornblende, hypersthene, opaque minerals, plagioclase, pyroxene and quartz. Magma mixing phenomena produced olivine and pyroxene xenocrysts and amphibole reaction rims.

== Eruption history ==
Volcanic activity probably commenced 3.3–1.5 million years ago or during the late Pleistocene. The 3.7±0.2-million-year-old Las Lozas Andesite may have been a precursor of Ojos del Salado. The oldest rocks of Ojos del Salado are 3.5–3.4-million-year-old dacites in the lower parts of the volcano. Argentine geological maps define a "Ojos del Salado basal complex", which consists of a number of Miocene volcanoes that have erupted andesite and dacite, partially in glacial environments.

The volcano developed in two stages, with the more recent one grown on top of the older. A somma volcano structure may have formed during an eruption that generated the pumice deposits on the lower slopes of the volcano, and there are potential air fall deposits north of it. Ojos del Salado may or may not have produced pyroclastic flows; the neighbouring Nevado Tres Cruces c. 67,000 years ago produced extensive deposits on and around Ojos del Salado and in the valley between the two volcanoes; these were originally interpreted to have originated at Ojos del Salado. A pyroclastic flow erupted by Ojos del Salado descended the Cazadero valley and constitutes the "El Quemado Ignimbrite". Cerro Solo, whose emplacement was probably accompanied by intense pyroclastic flow activity, and lava domes in the summit region are of Pleistocene age. The long-term growth rate of Ojos del Salado amounts to 0.03–0.04 cubic kilometres per kiloare (0.0072–0.0096 mi^{3}/ka).

Radiometric dating has yielded ages of 153±0.13, 1.2±0.3 million, and less than one million years ago for rocks in the northwestern part of Ojos del Salado, 1.08±0.09 million years for flows underlying the summit, 1.08±0.04 million years for the northern flank of Ojos del Salado, 700000±50000 for its western flank, 450000±60000 for El Muerto, 340000±190000 years for the summit rocks, and 230000±40000 years for El Fraile. Lava flows and a lava dome on the northern flank have yielded ages of 100000±17000 and 35,000 years, respectively. The "El Quemado Ignimbrite" may be either 200,000 or less than 50,000 years old. The youngest dates reported are 30,000 years ago.

=== Holocene and historical activity ===
The volcano produced lava flows during the Holocene, which cover an area of 120 square kilometres (46 sq mi), as well as pumice deposits at Laguna Verde and elongated fractures in the summit region. A rhyodacitic eruption was dated with tephrochronology to have occurred 750±250 CE, and may have deposited tephra over the Bolson de Fiambala and in the Tafí and Villa Vil areas of northwestern Argentina. Many volcanic rocks have a fresh appearance, but there is no clear evidence of recent activity.

There are no confirmed historical eruptions, (Note: Historical eruptions may have been missed, however, due to the remote location of the volcano.) and the volcano is presently inactive. In November 1993, observers witnessed ash and steam columns on two separate days, but no deformation of the volcano was observed by satellites during this occasion. An ash cloud observed on June 13, 2015, which led to warnings about volcanic ash to aircraft, turned out to be wind-blown volcanic ash in the Fiambala valley. Seismic activity has been reported.

=== Hazards ===
There is no information on volcanic hazards at Ojos del Salado, and volcanic hazards in the Central Volcanic Zone are poorly reconnoitred, but a 2018 presentation at the University of Auckland ranked it 14th of 38 Argentine volcanoes and the Chilean geological agency SERNAGEOMIN 75th out of 92, thus as a very low-risk volcano. The latter has published hazard maps for the Chilean part of the volcano. Future eruptions would most likely produce lava domes, lava flows and minor explosive activity, and the presence of ice on the mountain makes it a potential source for lahars. Effects would most likely be limited to the direct surroundings of the volcano, such as highway Chile Route 31.

=== Fumarolic activity ===
There are fumaroles that emit sulfurous fumes. Polish climbers in 1937 first observed this activity, 200 metres (650 ft) below the summit and in the summit crater. Fumarolic activity appears to be linked to a rift structure on the volcano. Climbers in 1957 reported that the fumaroles were noisy and the emissions intense enough that with unfavourable winds they could suffocate people. The fumaroles can be observed from satellites in the form of temperature anomalies which reach 4 K (7.2 °F) above background temperatures, but the steam plumes are poorly visible from the ground except from close distance or during episodes of increased fumarolic activity. Geysers have been reported in the summit region. Hot springs occur at the shores of Laguna Verde, which may be part of a hydrothermal circulation system of Ojos del Salado. According to a 2020 publication, the mountain was being evaluated for the generation of geothermal power.

== Climate ==
Detailed climate data do not exist for the area. (Note: Between 2012 and 2025, annual precipitation at Laguna Verde reached 181 ± 25.5 millimetres (7.13 ± 1.00 in)) The Puna de Atacama region has an extreme climate with strong wind, high elevation, a dry climate and high insolation; the area is in or just south of the Arid Diagonal.

Temperatures at lower elevations can exceed 10 °C (50 °F) but mean annual temperatures only reach −10 °C (14 °F). Mean winds at Laguna Verde reach maximum speeds of 8–10 metres per second (26–33 ft/s) in winter; on the mountaintops they can exceed 10 metres per second (33 ft/s) and can impede climbing attempts. Winds blow strongest in the afternoon. The winds produce aeolian landforms such as aeolian sediments, dunes, gravel pavements, abraded rocks and megaripples at lower elevations, and redeposit snow.

Precipitation consists mostly of hail and snow. It either amounts to less than 150 millimetres (5.9 in) per year or reaches 300–500 millimetres (12–20 in) per year. Compared to sites farther north, precipitation falls primarily during winter, although snowfall is common in summer. Precipitation probably peaks at 5,500 metres (18,000 ft) where the cloud base lies; above that elevation it decreases to about 200 millimetres (7.9 in). Snow cover in the area is sporadic and quickly sublimates, which hinders its measurement; the average snow cover is less than 5 centimetres (2.0 in) thick.

== Vegetation and fauna ==
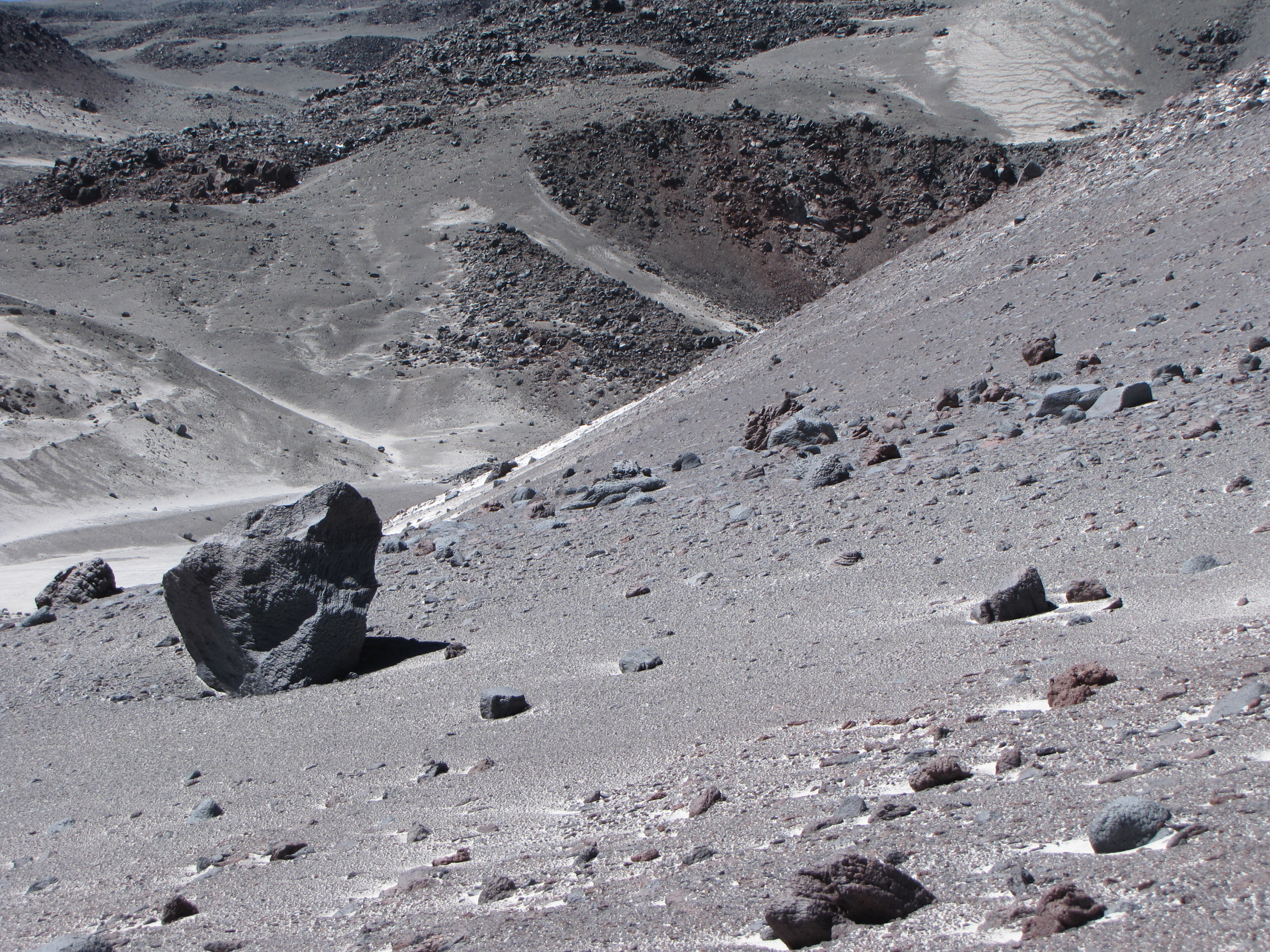
Bouldery landscape of Ojos del Salado

Due to the dry climate, the region is a desert with little vegetation occurring above 4,600 metres (15,100 ft) elevation, and none above 4,900 metres (16,100 ft). However, lichens and mosses have been found at higher elevations and green growths have been reported from the summit region. As of 2007, there were no reports of plants in the waterbodies on Ojos del Salado. Salt-, acid- and cold-tolerant bacteria have been recovered from sediments in the lakes on Ojos del Salado, consistent with microorganism samples from similar dry volcanic environments.

A diverse flora and fauna has been described in the lower elevation regions south-southeast of Ojos del Salado. Birds such as ducks, flamingos and geese and mammals such as guanacos and vicuñas occur in the Santa Rosa–Maricunga–Negro Francisco region. Chinchillas and vicuñas live in the valleys south of Ojos del Salado, and have drawn humans to the region. Mice venture to elevations of 5,250 metres (17,220 ft), and earwigs have been observed at 5,960 metres (19,550 ft) elevation.

== Human history ==
As Ojos del Salado is hidden behind and nested among many peaks of similar elevation, for centuries travellers and mountaineers paid little attention to the mountain. Its remoteness meant that for a long time both its elevation and exact topography were unclear. The positions and names of the mountains were frequently confused.

The Inca used the Paso San Francisco as a major crossing of the Andes but there is no evidence of them building any structures on Ojos del Salado (Note: The explorer Johan Reinhard was referenced in a 2002 publication to have found an Inca archaeological site on Ojos del Salado but the archaeologist Nicholas J. Saunders reported an absence of ruins on the mountain in 1992 and Johan Reinhard likewise mentioned that there were no ruins on Ojos del Salado in that year.) even though a number of such sites exist in the surrounding region. The Spanish conquistador Diego de Almagro crossed the Andes at Ojos del Salado but did not mention it. (Note: The large losses of animals and men during the crossing may have been the inspiration for the many death-themed mountain names in the region.) Ojos del Salado is likewise absent from the 1861 plans of William Wheelwright for a railway across Paso San Francisco. The explorer Walter Penck crossed the area in 1912/13 and 1913/14 but did not identify the mountain.

=== Ascents and debate on elevation ===
In 1896, 1897 and 1903 the Chile–Argentina boundary commission identified a peak in the area and named it "Ojos del Salado"; according to a myth their "Ojos del Salado" was a much smaller mountain and the actual Ojos del Salado was their "Peak 'e'". The Polish climbers Justyn Wojsznis and Jan Szczepański from the Second Polish Andean Expedition reached the summit on February 26, 1937 and left a cairn, (Note: Later Austrian climbers found out that the cairn was not located on the exact summit of Ojos del Salado.) but most of the maps and report they drafted were lost during World War II.

After the Polish expedition, the mountain remained unclimbed until 1955, although expeditions went to its lower slopes and sometimes confused other peaks for Ojos del Salado. In that year an expedition from Tucumán ascended a mountain south of Ojos del Salado, which they mistook for the volcano. They stated that the peak may be higher than Aconcagua, which media reported as if it were proven fact. These measurements set off a debate whether Ojos del Salado was higher than Aconcagua and thus the highest summit of the Western Hemisphere, and drew attention to the mountain. Three separate Chilean, Argentine and Austrian parties went to Ojos del Salado in 1956; the Chilean party measured an elevation of 7,084 metres (23,241 ft) with a barometer, a value that was once again presented as proven by the press despite the unreliability of this technique. The Chilean party also claimed seeing the Argentine pampa to the east and the Pacific Ocean to the west from the summit. In 1957, the official elevation of Ojos del Salado was 6,870 metres (22,540 ft) according to Argentina and 6,880 metres (22,570 ft) according to Chile.

The debate on the elevation and confusion about which mountain was Ojos del Salado and who climbed which peak prompted an expedition by the American Alpine Club in 1956. The expedition was hindered by bad weather conditions, and a gust of wind stretching a measurement line may have almost frustrated the goal to determine the summit elevation of Ojos del Salado. The same party later used geodetic methods to establish the elevation of Ojos del Salado as 6,885.5 ± 3 metres (22,590.2 ± 9.8 ft) and lower than the 6,960 metres (22,830 ft) high Aconcagua. In 1989, Francesco Santon of the University of Padua in Italy, with Argentine assistance, used GPS-based positioning to determine an elevation of 6,900 ± 5 metres (22,638 ± 16 ft).

== Mountaineering and tourism ==
Ojos del Salado and the surrounding mountains draw fewer mountaineers than Aconcagua, with only several hundred climbers every year. Since the 1990s commercial tours have become important facilitators for ascents, and the number of climbers has increased in the 21st century. Ojos del Salado is one of the Second Seven Summits and Volcanic Seven Summits mountaineering challenges. It is easier to climb than an eight thousander owing to its lower elevation and the absence of rock faces and ice, but the high elevation, (Note: The topography of the region with the mountain rising sharply from a high-altitude region makes acclimatization difficult, and medical resources to deal with acute mountain sickness are far away.) cold, dry and windy weather (Note: Winds are a significant nuisance for mountaineers, damaging equipment, blinding people and causing dangerous wind chill.) and impassable terrain are common challenges for would-be climbers, and only a third of all climbing attempts reach the summit. The mountain can be ascended from both the Argentine and the Chilean side, but owing to the better logistics most ascents occur from the Chilean side. The increasing mountaineering activities on Ojos del Salado have raised concerns about environmental impacts.

Ascent from the Chilean side is easier as the first refuge can be reached by car, but the actual climb is easier from the Argentine side. A dirt road departing from the Chile Route 31 highway to Paso San Francisco heads south to Ojos del Salado, past Refugio Murray to the bivouac Refugio Universidad de Atacama/Jorge Rojas at 5,200 metres (17,100 ft) elevation; from there a path goes to Refugio Tejos at 5,825 metres (19,111 ft) elevation and eventually to the summit of Ojos del Salado through scree-covered slopes and a steep ridge/couloir at the end. Ropes and supports are available. Between 2004 and 2015, a Chilean company held a mountaineering concession for the Chilean side and maintained the infrastructure there; after the end of the concession, maintenance resumed in 2018. From Argentina, the path runs from Cazadero Grande (Quemadito hut) along a large creek to its origin at Aguas Calientes at 4,200 metres (13,800 ft). From there it continues first up dry valleys to Acqua di Vicuna at 4,950 metres (16,240 ft) elevation, to the El Arenal plateau at 5,500 metres (18,000 ft) elevation and eventually along various routes to Ojos del Salado. The mountain is also accessible by vehicle, up to 6,650 metres (21,820 ft) or 5,900 metres (19,400 ft) elevation, through a dirt road built after a helicopter accident in 1994.

West of the volcano lies the Nevado Tres Cruces National Park, and in 1991/1994 there were plans to make a national park on the Argentine side as well. As of 2020, the establishment of a "zone of touristic interest" encompassing Ojos del Salado was under discussion in Chile.

== Other uses ==
Astronomers have surveyed the volcano for the possibility of creating an observatory there. (Note: Brunier 1989 discussed astronomical observations on Ojos del Salado rather than directly making an observatory there.) The landforms such as the gullies and crater lakes and their conditions, and climatic conditions around Ojos del Salado have also led researchers to investigate it as a potential analogue to environments on Mars. The volcano is one of several depicted on Chilean passports.

Numerous record-high altitude attempts with vehicles have been carried out at Ojos del Salado, including with cars, electric vehicles, motorcycles and utility vehicles. A modified car was driven to an elevation of 6,688 metres (21,942 ft) in 2015.

== See also ==
- List of volcanoes in Argentina
- List of volcanoes in Chile
- Lists of volcanoes
- Llullaillaco
- Monte Pissis
- Tipas

== Bibliography ==
- Biggar, John (2005). The Andes: A Guide for Climbers. Andes. ISBN 978-0-9536087-2-0.
- Radehose, Eckehard (2002). Traumberge Amerikas: von Alaska bis Feuerland (in German). Bergverlag Rother GmbH. ISBN 978-3-7633-3006-5.
