= Malli Mastan Babu =

Indian mountaineer (1974–2015)

Mastan Babu Malli
- Malli Mastan Babu
- Born: September 3rd, 1974; Gandhi Janasangam, Nellore, Andhra Pradesh
- Died: 24 March 2015 (aged 41); Nevado Tres Cruces, Andes
- Education: NIT Jamshedpur - B.Tech; IIT Kharagpur - M.Tech; IIM Calcutta - PGDM
- Occupation: Mountaineer
- Website: 1stindian7summits.com

Mastan Babu Malli (3 September 1974 – 24 March 2015) was an Indian mountaineer. In 2006, he broke the previous record by climbing the Seven Summits in 172 days, starting on January 19th, 2006 and finishing on July 10th, 2006. This accomplishment also made him the first South Asian to climb all seven summits, and the first Indian to climb Vinson Massif, and the Puncak Jaya, (also known as the Carstensz Pyramid). Malli died on March 24th, 2015 in the Andes mountains while on an expedition to summit Tres Cruces Sur.

== Early life and education ==
Malli was born on 3 September 1974 in Gandhi Jana Sangam village, Sangam Mandal, Nellore district, Andhra Pradesh, to Malli Mastanayya and Subbamma. He was the youngest of five children. He was among the first in his family to receive formal education.

He studied at Sainik School, Korukonda from 1985 to 1992. After completing his B.E. in Electrical Engineering at the National Institute of Technology, Jamshedpur in 1996, Malli went on to earn an M.Tech. in electronics from Indian Institute of Technology Kharagpur in 1998. After a three-year stint as a software engineer with Satyam Computers, Malli was selected for the two-year Post Graduate Diploma in Management (PGDM) program at Indian Institute of Management Calcutta, from which he graduated in 2004.

He was reportedly inspired to take up mountaineering by his school's statue of Lt. M. Uday Bhaskar Rao, a former student who lost his life during the Indian Army's Everest expedition of 1985. At IIM Calcutta, Malli received the Dr. B. C. Roy Award for his contributions to campus life.

Malli's efforts to improve the fitness levels of his fellow students and to institutionalize adventure activities led to the founding of IIM-C's Adventure Club in 2003. The club continues to organize numerous events both on and off campus.

== Initiatives, achievements, and awards ==
Malli was awarded the annual Distinguished Alumnus Award, presented by the Indian Institute of Management Calcutta in November 2011, the Army Commander's Commendation in 2007 and the 2006 Conjee Rustumjee Cohoujee Bey Award given by the Friends of South Asian American Communities in California (FOSACC) for youth contribution.

After climbing Mount Everest, he moved towards Mount Kailash, but he did not ascend it due to its religious significance. Malli paid tribute to Lt. Uday Bhaskar Rao, and planted his school flag during his Everest trips. Many of his expeditions were planned but unguided.

In June and July 2007, he made a high-altitude trek through the four major Hindu Dhams of Uttarakhand. In the same year, between 21 October and 3 November, he planned to run 14 half marathons, in 14 days, across 14 different Indian states, in the given time, he ran 8 full marathons and 3 half marathons in 13 days, across 10 states.

In 2008, he completed a 75-day high-altitude trek from the Mount Everest region to Kanchenjunga, climbing all the high passes between them, covering a total of approximately 1,100km of the Himalayan terrain. With his 2,000km, 132-day trans-Himalayan expedition from Mount Everest to Mount Kailash, Malli wanted to raise awareness about glaciers in the Himalayas melting due to climate change.

== Seven Summits ==
In 2006, he accomplished the Seven Summits, the highest peak in each of the seven continents, in a span of 172 days. At the time, this was also a world record.

Continent	Mountain	Elevation (m)	Summit date	Day
Antarctica	Vinson Massif	4897	19 January 2006	Thursday
South America	Aconcagua	6962	17 February 2006	Friday
Africa	Mount Kilimanjaro	5895	15 March 2006	Wednesday
Asia	Mount Everest	8848	21 May 2006	Sunday
Europe	Mount Elbrus	5642	13 June 2006	Tuesday
North America	Mount McKinley (Denali)	6194	10 July 2006	Monday
Australia	Puncak Jaya (Carstensz Pyramid)	4884	28 October 2006	Saturday

== Death ==
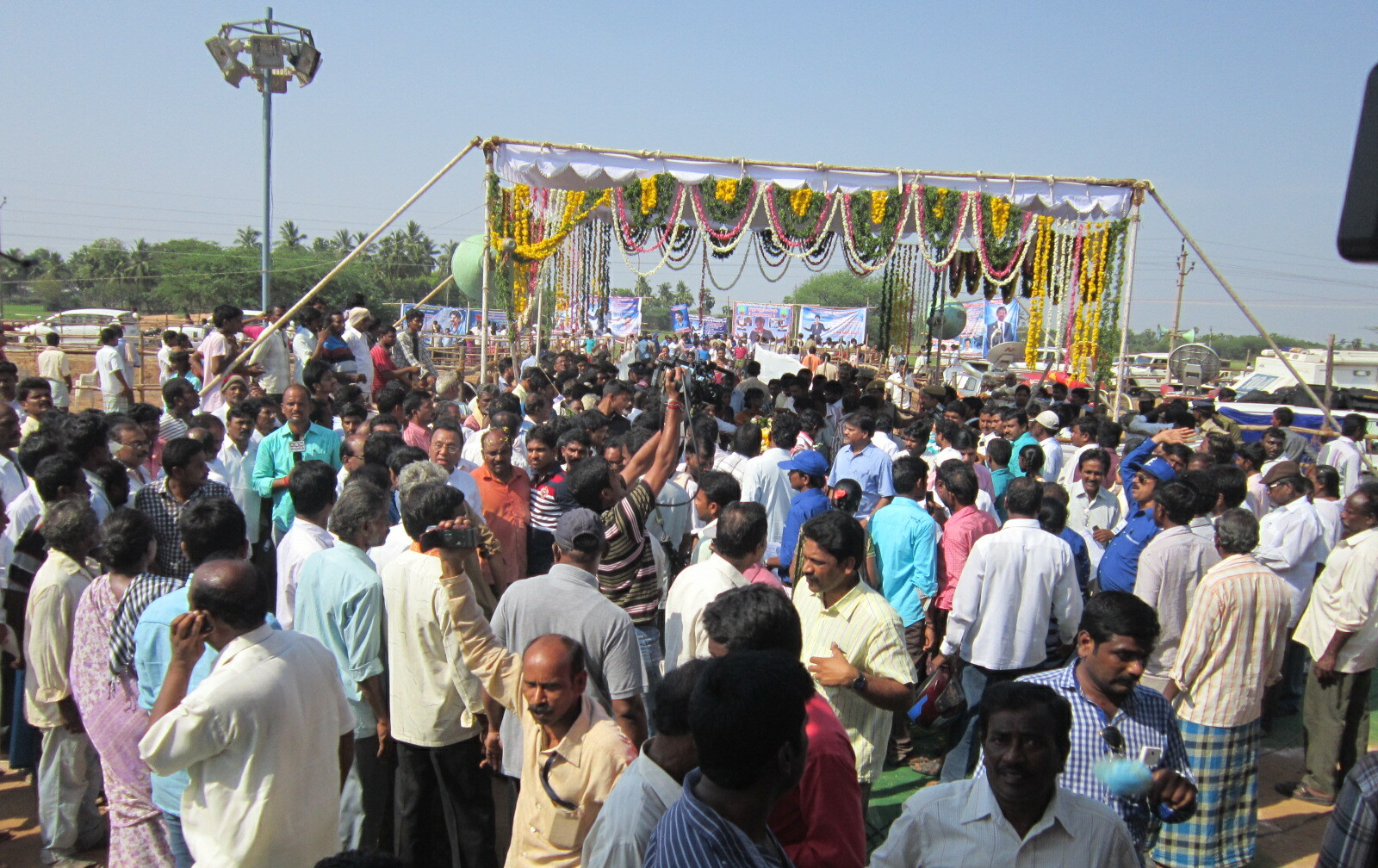
Mastan Babu's funeral at Janasangam, India

Malli went missing on 24 March 2015 and died outside his pitched tent on the slopes of Cerro Tres Cruces Sur in the Andes. Malli, who was climbing solo, was caught in extreme weather during the 2015 Northern Chile floods and mudflow in the Andes which cut all the access routes to mountain. It took the rescue teams 10 days to reach his location. His body was found on April 3, 2015. He planned to return to India by the end of the month after climbing the last of the ten highest peaks in the Andes.

Prime Minister Narendra Modi paid homage to Malli. The Chief Minister of Andhra Pradesh, N. Chandrababu Naidu, also condoled his death.

== See also ==
- List of Indian summiters of Mount Everest
- List of Mount Everest summiters by frequency
- List of Mount Everest records of India
- List of Mount Everest records
