= Cerro Solo =

Mountain in Argentina

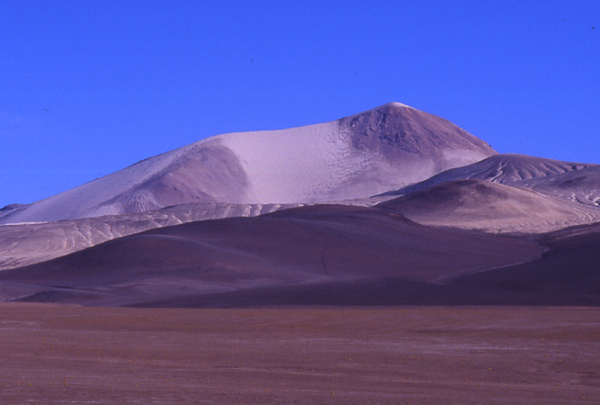
- Cerro Solo from the North

Highest point
- Elevation: 6,215 m (20,390 ft)
- Prominence: 715 m (2,346 ft)
- Parent peak: Nevado Tres Cruces
- Coordinates: 27°6′19.07″S 068°42′47.52″W

Geography
- Location within Argentina
- Location: Argentina-Chile
- Parent range: Andes

Geology
- Mountain type: Stratovolcano
- Last eruption: Unknown

Climbing
- First ascent: 02/21/1950 - Luis Alvarado, Jorge Balastino, Carlos and Oscar Alvarez (Chile)
- Easiest route: Hike

Cerro Solo is a large stratovolcano on the border between Argentina and Chile, west of Ojos del Salado with an elevation of 6,215 metres (20,390 ft) metres. (Note: Official height of 6205 meters.) (Note: Other data from available digital elevation models: SRTM yields 6200 metres, SRTM 6200 metres, ALOS 6183 metres and TanDEM-X 6241 metres) (Note: The height of the nearest key col is 5500 meters, leading to a topographic prominence of 715 meters. Its parent peak is Tres Cruces Sur and the Topographic isolation is 6.5 kilometers.) It consists of nine eruptive centers and is covered in light-colored rhyodacite pyroclastic flow deposits.

Its territory is within the Argentinean protection area of Catamarca High Andean and Puna Lakes Ramsar Site. It is located in the territory of the Argentinean province of Catamarca (commune of Fiambalá) and the Chilean province of Copiapo (commune of Copiapó).

== First Ascent ==
Solo was first climbed by Luis Alvarado, Jorge Balastino, Carlos and Oscar Alvarez (Chile) on 21 February 1950.

== See also ==
- List of volcanoes in Argentina
- List of volcanoes in Chile
