= Frailes =

Frailes or Los Frailes may refer to:

- Frailes, Spain, a municipality in the province of Jaén, Spain
- Frailes, Desamparados, Costa Rica, a town in the Desamparados canton, San José province, Costa Rica
- Frailes, Guaynabo, Puerto Rico, a barrio in Puerto Rico
- Frailes, Yauco, Puerto Rico, a barrio in Puerto Rico
- Islas Los Frailes, a Venezuelan archipelago of rock islets
- Los Frailes, a beach north of Puerto López, Ecuador
- Los Frailes mine, Andalusia, Spain, where the 1998 Doñana disaster began

== See also ==
- Fraile (disambiguation)
- Cordillera de los Frailes, a mountainous region in the Bolivian Andes
