= Frailty (band) =

Latvian death-doom metal band

Frailty is a Latvian death-doom metal band from Riga, formed in 2003.

They started their career playing concerts on stages of the Latvian metal underground scene. In 2007 they recorded their first demo. In 2008, the band signed a contract with Russian doom metal label Solitude Productions and released their first album, Lost Lifeless Lights.

== Members ==
=== Current ===
- Edmunds Vizla – guitars, vocals (2003)
- Lauris Polinskis – drums (2006)
- Mārtiņš Lazdāns – vocals (2006)
- Andris Začs – bass (2013); keyboards (2007–2008)
- Jēkabs Vilkārsis – guitars (2011)

=== Former ===
- Artūrs Retenais – bass (2003–2007)
- Juris "Hellhammer" Zilvers – vocals (2004–2005)
- Kārlis Ulmanis – bass (2007–2008)
- Ģirts Fersters – guitars (2003–2010)
- Jānis Jēkabsons – bass (2011–2013)
- Ivita Puzo – keyboards (2009–2013)
- Iļja Poteškins – guitars (2010)
- Toms Krauklis – bass (2008–2009)
- Alex Makarovs – bass (2009)
- Kaspars Grīnbergs – drums (2004–2006)

== Discography ==
- Tumši Ūdeņi (LP) (2020)
- Ways of the Dead (LP) (2017)
- Melpomene (LP) (2012)
- Silence Is Everything.. (EP) (2010)
- EP (2009)
- Lost Lifeless Lights (LP) (2008)
- Promo (2007)
