= Falso Azufre =

Mountain in Argentina

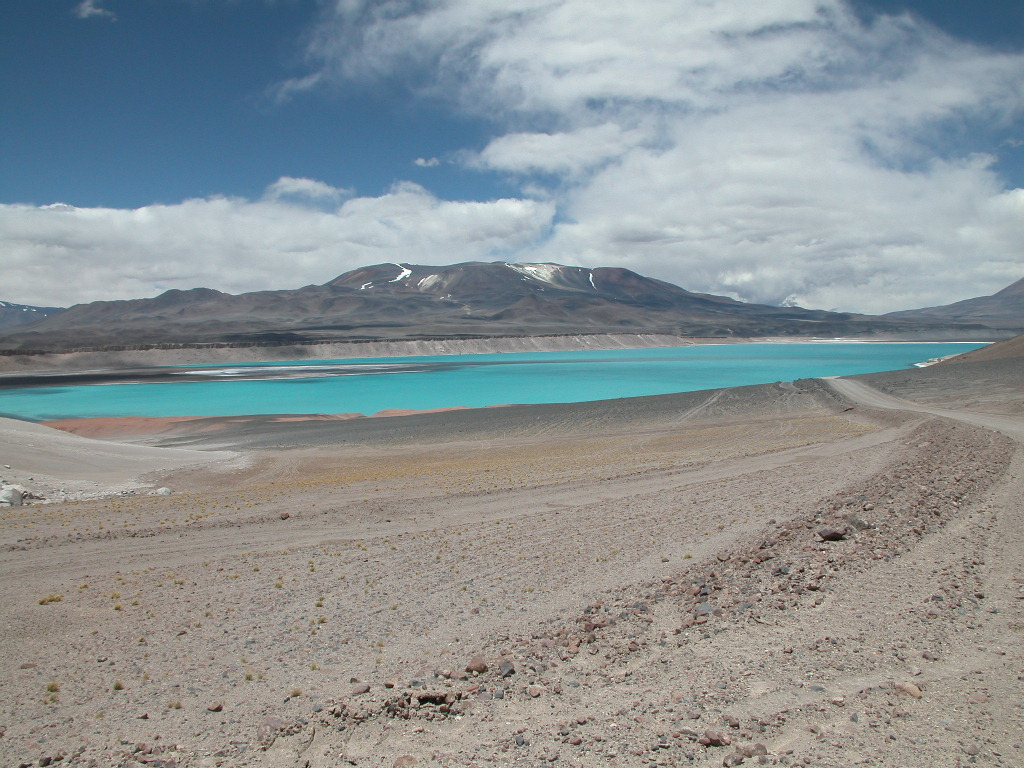
- Falso Azufre volcanic complex and Laguna Verde.

Highest point
- Elevation: 5,906 m (19,377 ft)
- Coordinates: 26.80°S 68.37°W

Geography
- Location: Argentina and Chile
- Parent range: Andes

Geology
- Mountain type: Complex volcano
- Last eruption: Unknown

Falso Azufre is a complex volcano at the border of Argentina and Chile.

Falso Azufre is elongated in east–west direction and contains craters and lava domes; most craters have diameters of 300–600 metres (980–1,970 ft) with the exception of the main crater, which is 1 by 1.3 kilometres (0.62 mi × 0.81 mi) wide. The highest summit Cerro Falso Azufre lies at the western end in Chile, which has mostly generated pyroclastic material from craters. The probably youngest segment of the volcano is the eastern section in Argentina, where two lava domes and two cones are located; these form the Dos Conos volcano. Some lava flows linked to Dos Conos are up to 7 kilometres (4.3 mi) long. The oldest is known as the Kunstmann edifice on the northwestern side of Falso Azufre; Kunstmann volcano features a 3 kilometres (1.9 mi) wide scar formed by a sector collapse. Falso Azufre with a base surface of 387 square kilometres (149 sq mi) is one of the biggest volcanoes in the area. The presence of two oppositely curved vent alignments gives the complex an arc-like shape which reaches heights of about 5,900 metres (19,400 ft) above sea level.

Blocky lava flows, some of them quite large, form the bulk of the volcano. Neighbouring volcanoes are Nevado San Francisco, the Laguna Amarga caldera and Laguna Verde volcanoes; additional volcanics are of Miocene to Pliocene age. The Kunstmann edifice probably counts as a separate volcano as well.

The volcano has erupted trachyandesite, andesite and dacite. The rocks contain hornblende and pyroxene with a total content of 58-61% of SiO_{2} and form a potassium-rich calc-alkaline suite. In some parts of the volcano, its rocks have suffered hydrothermal alteration. Water from the mountain runs into Laguna Verde, which is to its southwest.

A number of dates have been obtained on Falso Azufre; with the exception of the oldest ones on the Kunstmann edifice (3.5 to 2.9 million years ago) Falso Azufre has only yielded ages of less than one million years, with older dates found in the western part of the volcano and the younger dates of less than 400,000 years ago in the eastern part; the absolutely youngest date was obtained on a lava flow linked to Dos Conos; 160,000 ± 80,000 years ago. Falso Azufre could thus be considered an extinct volcano, although recent activity cannot be ruled out. While the remoteness of the volcano reduces any hazard potential future pyroclastic eruptions could impact air traffic over the region and east of it; further a major road is close to the volcano. It is considered the 32nd most dangerous volcano out of 38 in Argentina.

Falso Azufre is part of the Central Volcanic Zone of the Andes together with about 110 other Quaternary volcanoes, and lies in the southern sector of the volcanic zone; other volcanic zones in the Andes are the Northern Volcanic Zone, the Southern Volcanic Zone and the Austral Volcanic Zone. The history of volcanic activity is poorly known for most of these volcanoes owing to the lack of dating; only a few historical eruptions have been recorded, such as an eruption at Ojos del Salado in 1993. It is considered the 32nd of the 38 volcanoes of Argentina by dangerousness.

== See also ==
- Cerro Torta
- List of volcanoes in Chile
- List of volcanoes in Argentina
