= John Frail =

Scottish footballer

Personal information
- Date of birth: 23 July 1882
- Place of birth: Burntisland, Scotland
- Date of death: 9 May 1915 (aged 32)
- Place of death: Pas-de-Calais, France
- Position(s): Outside right

Senior career*
| Years | Team | Apps | (Gls) |
| 1908–1912 | Lochgelly United | | |
| 1909 | → Hibernian (loan) | 0 | (0) |
| 1912–1914 | St Bernard's | 6 | (1) |
- *Club domestic league appearances and goals

John Frail (23 July 1882 – 9 May 1915) was a Scottish professional footballer who played in the Scottish League for St Bernard's as an outside right.

== Personal life ==
Frail was married with three children. He served as a private in the Black Watch during the First World War and was killed in action in Pas-de-Calais on 9 May 1915. Frail is commemorated on the Le Touret Memorial.

== Career statistics ==
Appearances and goals by club, season and competition
| Club | Season | League | | | Scottish Cup | | Total | |
| Club | Season | Division | Apps | Goals | Apps | Goals | Apps | Goals |
|---|---|---|---|---|---|---|---|---|
| St Bernard's | 1911–12 | Scottish Second Division | 1 | 0 | 0 | 0 | 1 | 0 |
| St Bernard's | 1912–13 | Scottish Second Division | 5 | 1 | 2 | 0 | 7 | 1 |
| Career total | | | 6 | 1 | 2 | 0 | 8 | 1 |
