= Francisco Fraile =

Mexican politician

- Born: Francisco Antonio Fraile García; 19 September 1948 (age 77); Huajuapan de León, Oaxaca, Mexico
- Education: Autonomous University of Puebla
- Occupation: Politician
- Political party: PAN

Francisco Antonio Fraile García (born 19 September 1948) is a Mexican politician affiliated with the National Action Party. As of 2014 he served as Senator of the LVIII and LIX Legislatures of the Mexican Congress representing Puebla. He also served as Deputy during the LX Legislature.
