= Fiambalá =

- Municipality
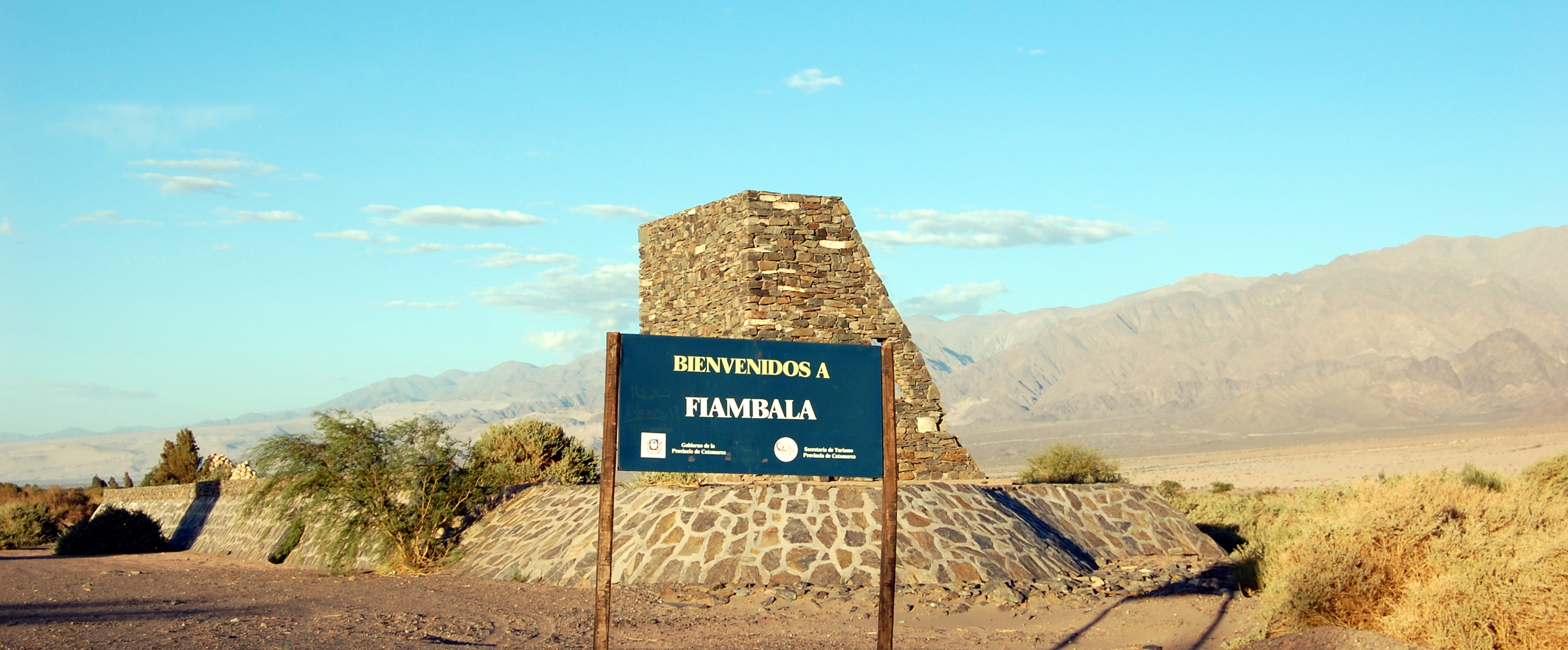
- Fiambala entrance

- Location in Argentina
- Coordinates: 27°40′0″S 67°37′00″W
- Country: Argentina
- Province: Catamarca
- Department: Tinogasta
- Settled: 1702
- Founder: Diego Frites de Carrizo

Government
  - Mayor: Amado David Quintar, FCyS
- Elevation: 1.505 m (4.94 ft)

Population
  - Total: 2.358 (2,001)
- Time zone: UTC−3 (ART)
- CPA Base: M 5354
- Area code: +54 3833
- Website: www.fiambala.gov.ar

Fiambalá is a town in the department of Tinogasta, located in the west part of Catamarca Province, Argentina. It is located at the beginning of the Altiplano at 1.505 m.a.s.l. and 320 km from the capital of Catamarca, San Fernando del Valle de Catamarca. It is situated along the Abaucán and La Troya rivers.

== Gallery ==
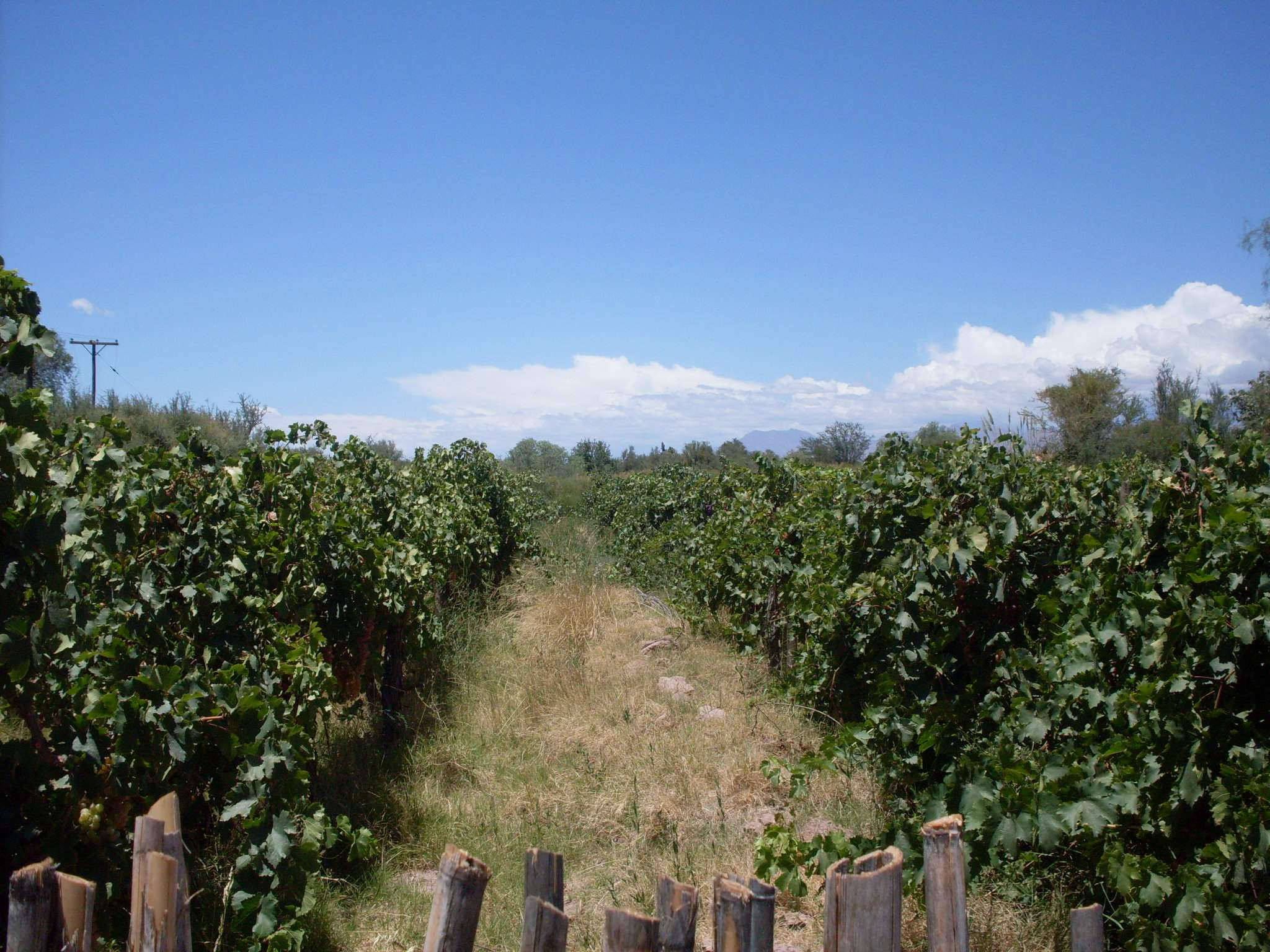
Fiambalá's wines

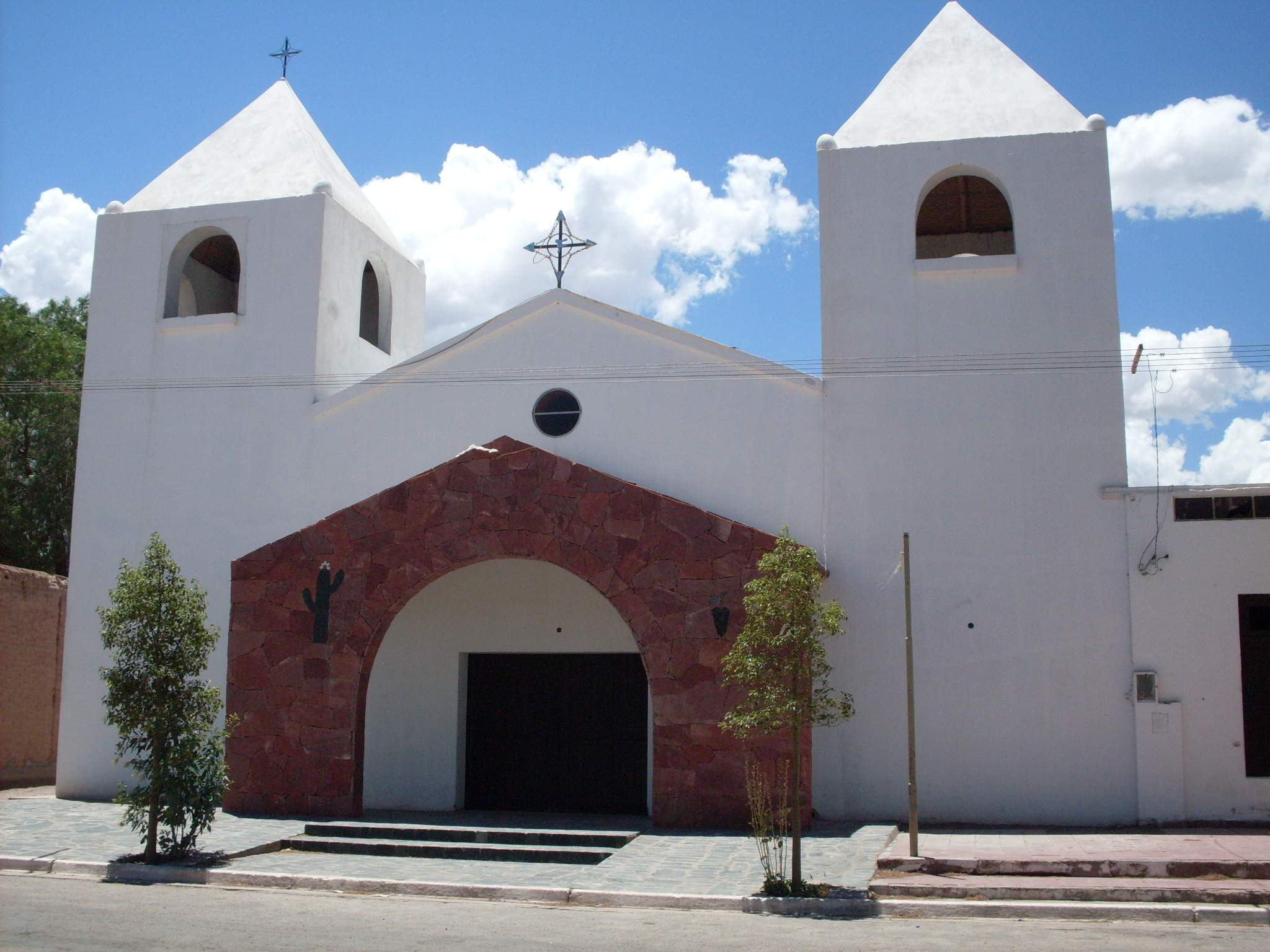
Church
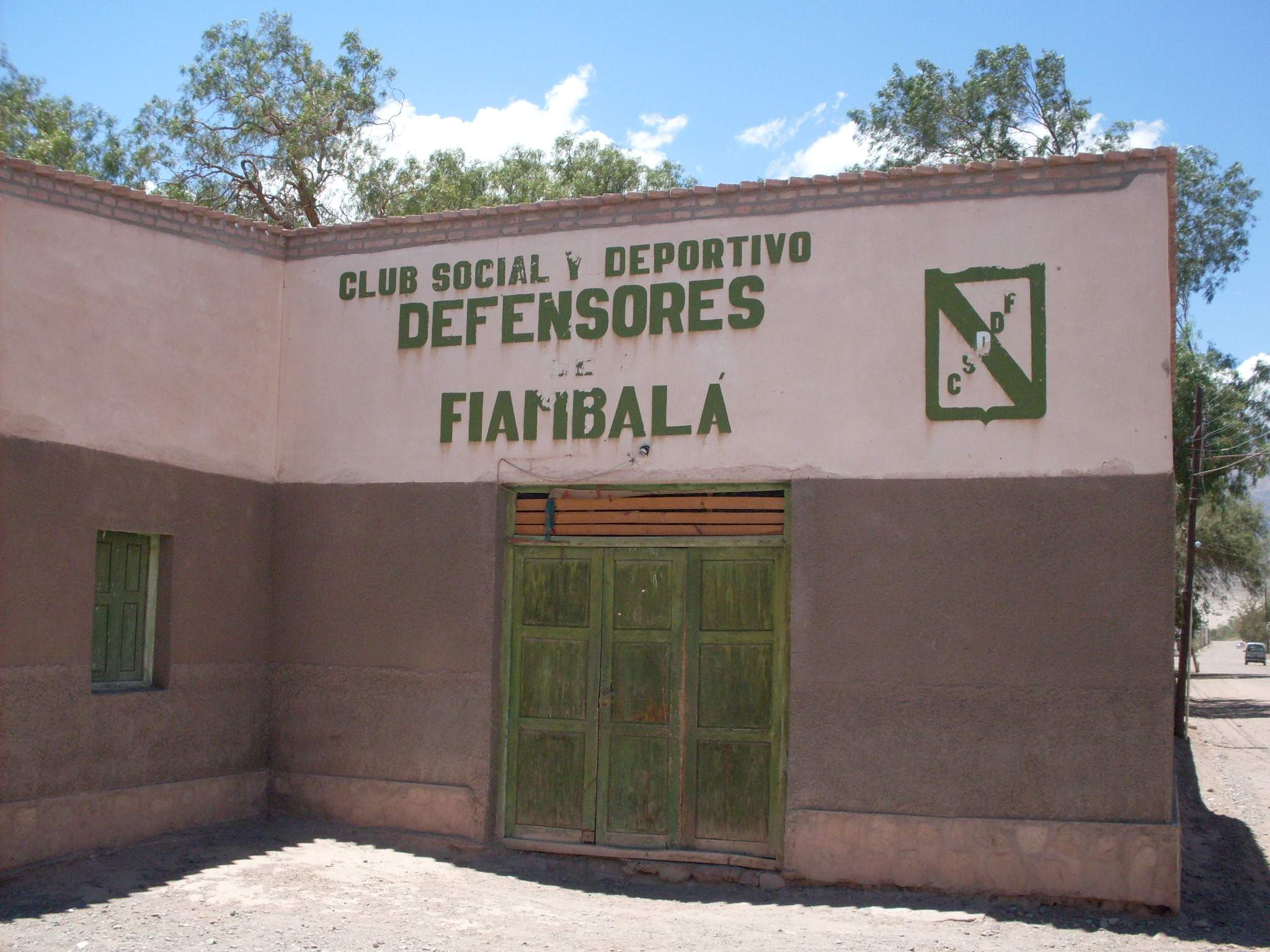
Fiambalá's sport club

== See also ==
- San Francisco Pass
- Duna Federico Kirbus
