= Nevado San Francisco =

Mountain in Argentina

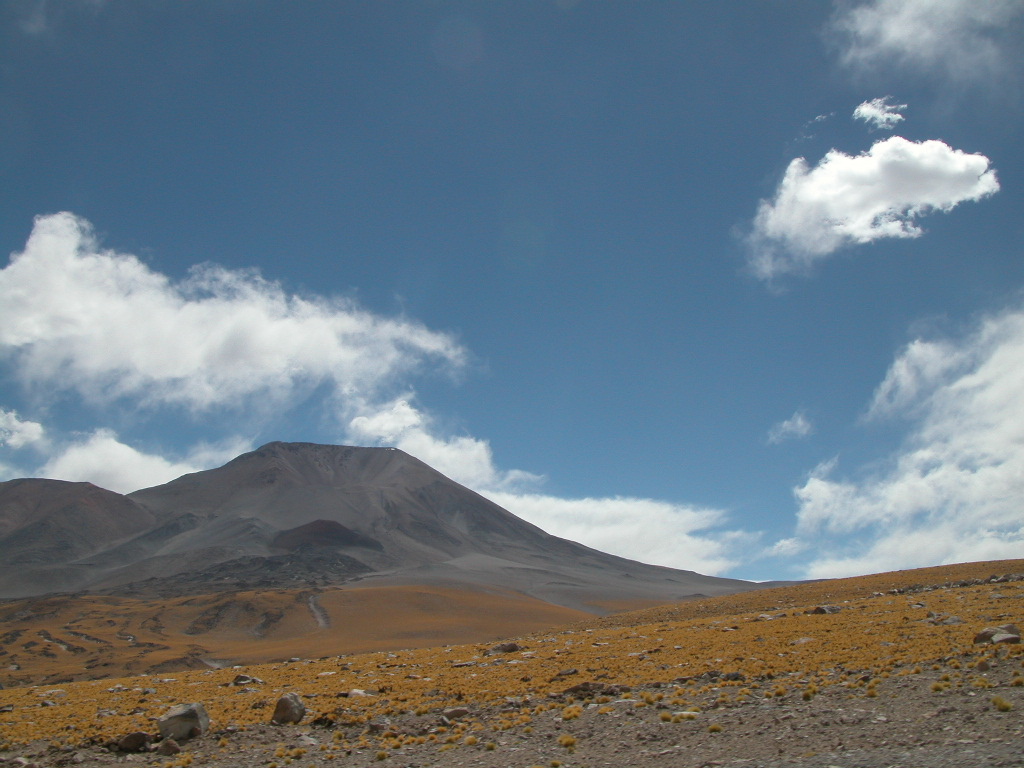

Highest point
- Elevation: 6,016 m (19,738 ft)
- Prominence: 1,124 metres (3,688 ft)
- Parent peak: Ojos del Salado
- Coordinates: 26°55′07.68″S 068°15′45.71″W

Geography
- Location: Argentina-Chile
- Parent range: Andes

Geology
- Rock age: 1.34 - 1.32 million years ago
- Mountain type: Stratovolcano
- Last eruption: Unknown

Climbing
- First ascent: 16 December 1913 - Walther Penck (Germany)

Nevado San Francisco, or Cerro San Francisco (Spanish pronunciation: [neˈβaðo/ˈsero saɱ fɾanˈsisko]), is a stratovolcano on the border between Argentina and Chile, located just southeast of San Francisco Pass. It is considered extinct and is one of the several 6,000 m (19,700 ft) peaks in the area, of which the chief is the Ojos del Salado. It is on the border of 2 provinces: Argentinean province of Catamarca; Chilean province of Copiapo.

The volcano is part of the Central Volcanic Zone of the Andes and reaches an elevation of 6,016 metres (19,738 ft). (Note: Other data from digital elevation models: SRTM yields 6,027 metres (19,774 ft), ASTER 6,019 metres (19,747 ft), SRTM filled with ASTER6,027 metres (19,774 ft), ALOS 6,019 metres (19,747 ft), TanDEM-X 6,069 metres (19,911 ft) and a handheld GPS survey by Maximo Kausch in October 2012 6,045 metres (19,833 ft).) (Note: The height of the nearest key col is 4,911 metres (16,112 ft), leading to a topographic prominence of 1,124 metres (3,688 ft) with a topographical dominance of 18.62%. Its parent peak is Ojos del Salado and the Topographic isolation is 34.8 kilometres (21.6 mi).) It is composed from andesite with the exception of basaltic cones and lava flows on the eastern side. These cones are part of the Peinado lineament and a sample was dated 200,000 years ago by argon chronology. They are noteworthy for their olivine phenocrysts. One lava flow less than one million years old reaches a length of 11 kilometres (6.8 mi). The western slopes contain dacitic lava domes. On the summit lie two circle-shaped constructs, of Inca or Formative period ages. San Francisco was first climbed by Walther Penck (Germany) on 16 December 1913.

== See also ==
- "San Francisco". Global Volcanism Program. Smithsonian Institution.
