= Laguna Negra, Catamarca =

Lake in Catamarca Province, Argentina

Laguna Negra
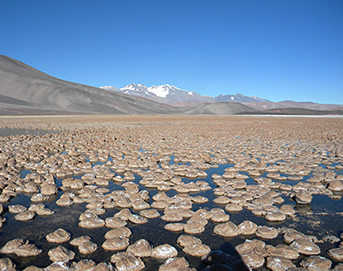
- Stromatolites cover part of Laguna Negra

- Location within Argentina
- Location: Argentina
- Coordinates: 27°38′49″S 68°32′43″W

Laguna Negra is a lake in the Catamarca Province of Argentina. It lies on the Puna high plateau next to two other lakes and salt flats. The lake is less than 2 metres (6 ft 7 in) deep and forms a rough rectangle with a surface of 8.6 square kilometres (3.3 sq mi). Laguna Negra loses its water through evaporation, and is replenished through surface runoff and groundwater which ultimately originate to a large part from snowmelt. The waters of the lake are salty.

On the southeastern shore of the lake, microbialites grow in the shallow water. These are structures formed by carbonate and microorganisms including diatoms and various bacteria. These structures have a layered internal structure and colours ranging from green to orange-pink to black. They have been compared to Precambrian stromatoliths, which were among the oldest forms of life on Earth.

== Regional and local ==
Laguna Negra lies at an elevation of 4,131 metres (13,553 ft) in the Tinogasta Department, Catamarca Province of Argentina, and near the San Francisco Pass between Chile and Argentina. The path to Monte Pissis passes close to the lake.

It covers a surface of 8.6 square kilometres (3.3 sq mi) and has the rough shape of a rectangle. The average depth of the lake does not exceed 2 metres (6 ft 7 in). The lake periodically floods its beaches. To the northwest, a salt flat separates the lake from its neighbours to the north and covers over half of the lake basin. A prominent alluvial fan borders Laguna Negra to the southeast and its northward growth has generated a shallow water area at the southeastern margin of the lake (Stromatolite Belt).

The waters of the lake are hypersaline, their principal salt is calcium chloride, although they have been described as mesosaline too. Arsenic is present at high concentrations. The high salinity prevents the water from freezing except at the margins of Laguna Negra, where salinity is lower due to inflow. Calcite and aragonite reach saturation concentration at points where groundwater enters the lake, leading to carbonate precipitation mainly along the southeastern margin of the lake. Conditions in the lake environments are alkaline and the consumption of carbon dioxide by degassing and photosynthesis facilitates carbonate precipitation.

The lake is fed mainly by groundwater and by runoff that enters mainly from the southwestern side. The water mainly originates through annual snowmelt. Laguna Negra has no surface outflow and is a closed lake; the lake waters evaporate in the strong wind and at high temperatures, leading to the precipitation of salts such as gypsum, halite and polyhalite in a sequential manner from carbonates to salts.

=== Regional context ===
Laguna Negra is the southernmost of three lakes aligned in north–south direction; the other two are Laguna de la Salina/Laguna Tres Quebradas to the north and Laguna Verde in the middle. They form the Laguna Verde Saline Complex, also known as Laguna Verde Complex or Salar de la Laguna Verde. The Salar de Tres Quebradas salt pan separates Laguna Verde from Laguna Tres Quebradas. Together these two lakes have a water surface of 26.2 square kilometres (10.1 sq mi). Lava flows from surrounding volcanoes have closed off the southern outlet of the valley occupied by the lakes. Smaller lakes exist nearby such as Laguna Azul northeast of Laguna Negra.

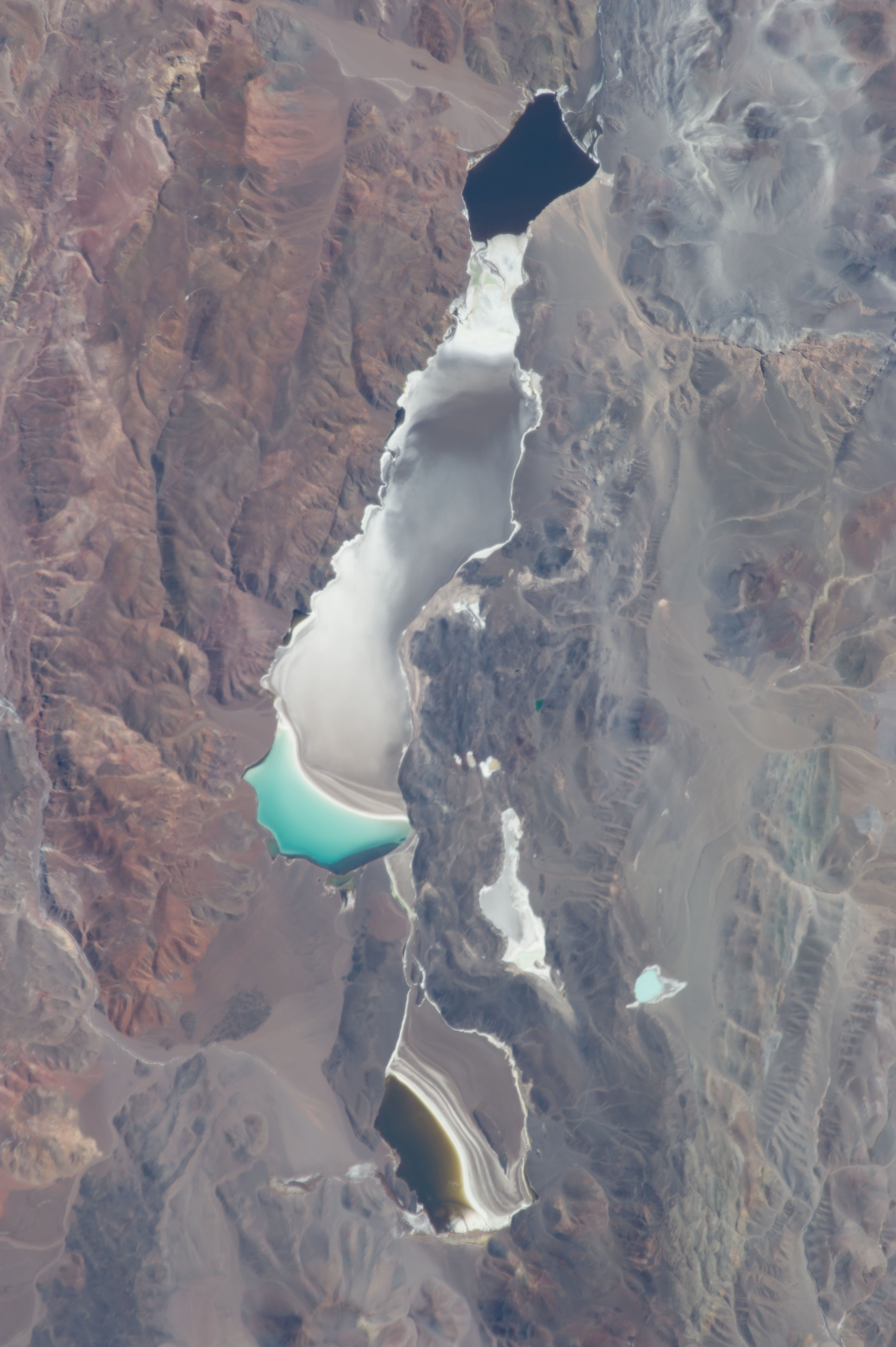
Laguna Negra, with Laguna Verde in the middle and Laguna Tres Quebradas/Laguna de la Salina to the north

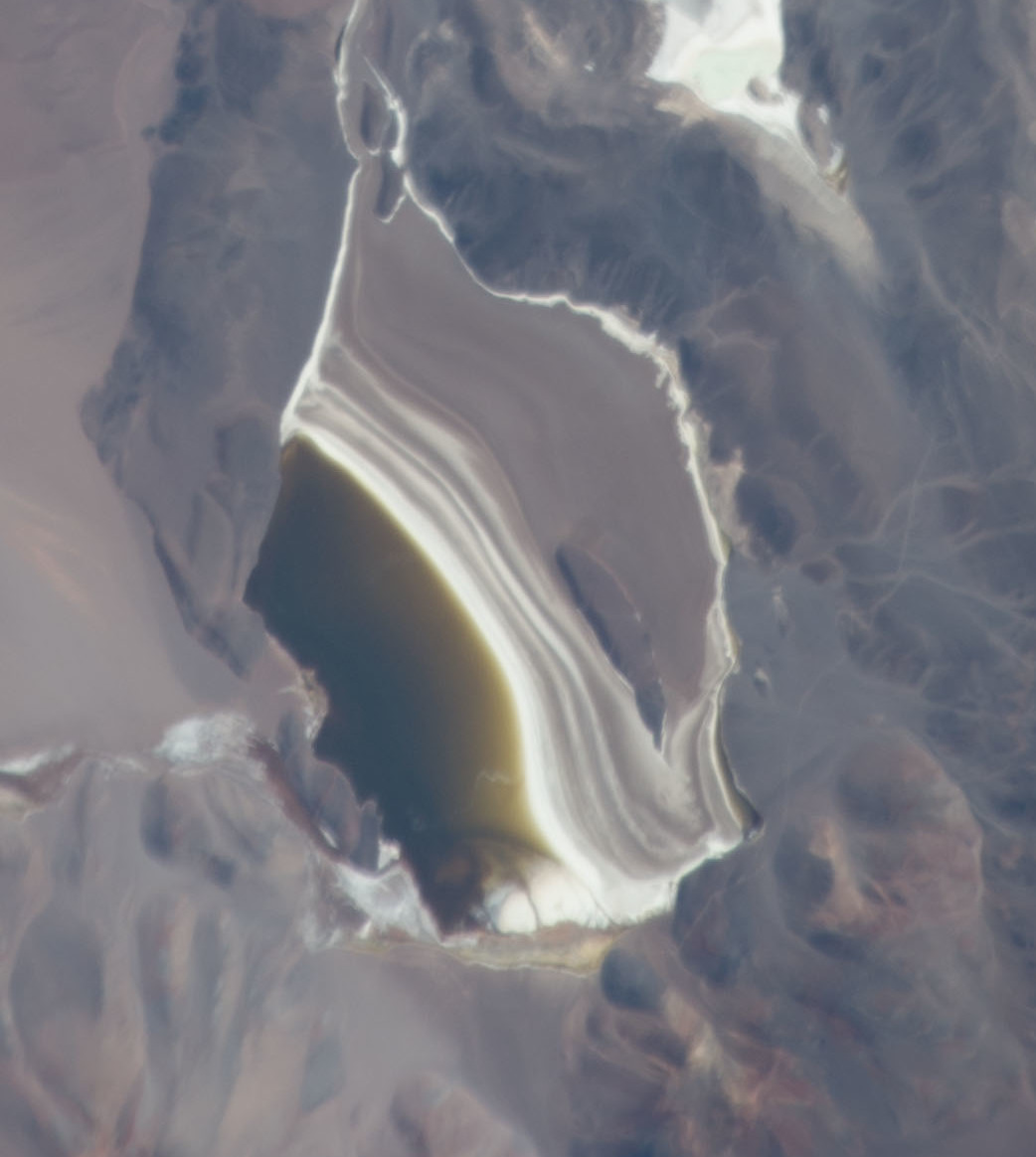
Laguna Negra, up is to the north-northwest

The lakes lie in the southernmost Puna, a high plateau at an elevation of 3,700 metres (12,100 ft) where a dry climate and Cenozoic uplift generated the Laguna Verde Saline Complex when block faulting generated separated drainage basins separated by north–south trending mountain ranges. The terrain consists mainly of volcanic rocks such as basalt and andesite; some summits exceed 6,000 metres (20,000 ft) elevation above sea level such as the 6,795 metres (22,293 ft) high Cerro Pissis. Evaporites, sand and silt cover the terrain around the lake.

== Climate, vegetation and fauna ==
The climate at Laguna Negra is cold, arid with strong winds. Temperature is highly variable, ranging between 30 – −10 °C (86–14 °F) in summer and between 8 – −30 °C (46 – −22 °F) in winter.

Annual precipitation is less than 250 millimetres per year (9.8 in/year) and falls mainly as snow. Evidence from other lakes in the region suggests that the environment was wetter than today between about 15,000–14,000 and 13,500–11,300 years before becoming dry during the middle Holocene. After about 4,000 years BP precipitation has increased again. Presently, the climate is dominated by the South Pacific High anticyclone which draws dry air into the region. During summer, an Atlantic anticyclone conversely transports moister and warmer air to the area, resulting in the formation of convective clouds and precipitation.

Climatic conditions together with the thin atmosphere at high elevations and high UV radiation (Note: Values of UV irradiation recorded at Laguna Negra reach 10.8 watts per square metre (0.00135 hp/sq ft), although extremely high values of UV irradiation in the region may be exaggerated by instrument errors.) limit the complexity of life at Laguna Negra, in particular of nonmicrobial life. In this sector of the Andes, peatlands are the key ecosystems, with the dominant plant species being Distichia muscoides, Oxychloe andina and Plantago rigida as well as graminoids and grasses. Mites are their most important fauna. Salt marsh grasses of the genus Spartina grow at the southern end of the lake, and copepods have been observed in ponds; both are linked to areas with lower salinity. The lakes are an important bird conservation site, and were added to the "South Sub-site of the Ramsar Sites, Lagunas Altoandinas y Puneñas de Catamarca" Ramsar Site in 2009.

== Carbonates and microbial mats ==
Both microbial mats and microbialites (Note: Fossilized microorganisms that form laminated structures. These fossils are generated either through the precipitation of carbonates or the clumping of detrital material. They are also known as stromatoliths.) occur at Laguna Negra and have diverse shapes. Their formation results mainly from the localized precipitation of carbonates where new water enters Laguna Negra. At the southern end of the lake, travertine crusts are found; they might form at sites of groundwater entry. Active tufa formation has been observed, making Laguna Negra one of only two lakes in the region (Note: Laguna Colorada in Bolivia is the other) where it takes place. White incrustations are formed by evaporation, when salt precipitates. Laguna Tres Quebradas north of Laguna Negra also features microbialites, which cover an area of 14,000 square metres (150,000 sq ft) in the river delta of the Salado River.

In the Stromatolite Belt, a 0.3 square kilometres (0.12 sq mi) large area at the southeastern part of the lake where water depths do not exceed 10 centimetres (3.9 in), they form laminar crusts, oncoids and stromatolites that are accompanied by microbial mats. These microbialites are found mainly in the northeastern Stromatolite Belt, while its central and western portions feature abiotic carbonate precipitation. A subdivision in a plant-grown sector, a non-mineralized sector and a carbonate precipitation sector is possible. Oncoids make up the bulk of the Stromatolite Belt. They can have smooth forms and ridged, pillar- or shrub-like protrusions and reach dimensions of over 10 centimetres (3.9 in). They can be buried in mud, submerged or partially emerged, and sometimes covered with halite. Colours range from green-yellow over orange to snow white, and the structures have the appearance of rocks strewn onto and emerging from the shallow lake. The oncoids have a concentrically layered internal structure, with the various layers often having different colours; the colour variations relate to compositional differences. The microscopic texture has been described as sparry, "micritic" and "botryoidal". Other growth forms are laminar crusts and column-shaped or flat stromatoliths. Oncoids also occur in the Salado river north of Laguna Tres Quebradas.

Microbial mats have colours ranging from back over pinkish-orange to greenish, and their structure ranges from pustular to stratified. Most are associated with oncoids. Greenish mats occur next to groundwater springs and often are found floating on bubbles, and black mats are found on partially exposed carbonates. The black mats are formed mainly by filamentous cyanobacteria of the Rivularia family. Layered microbial mats, where different layers have different colours, are found within 3–10 centimetres (1.2–3.9 in) deep ponds. So-called "diatom blooms" are linked to white carbonate precipitates that form bright spots on the coloured mats. The colours of the microbial constructs are due to carotenoid and scytonemin pigments, which serve to protect the microorganisms from UV radiation.

Radiometric dating of the carbonate structures is difficult owing to the scarcity of datable material, but uranium-thorium dating performed on one oncolite indicates that it began to develop in the Late Holocene. Observations indicate that the growth of the oncoliths is still ongoing.

=== Biology and scientific importance ===
There are both autotrophic and heterotrophic microorganisms in Laguna Negra. Autotrophs include cyanobacteria, as well as green sulfur bacteria and purple sulfur bacteria which conduct anoxygenic photosynthesis; sulfur deposits form during the process. Heterotrophic organisms include polysaccharide degrading and sulfate-reducing bacteria. There is a layering in metabolic activity, with regular photosynthesis at the surface, anoxygenic photosynthesis in intermediary layers and sulfate reduction at depth. Many microorganisms are extremophiles and tolerate high salinity and intense UV radiation.

Precipitation of carbonates is often associated with life and may be induced by the latter for various reasons, although at Laguna Negra it can also occur independently from biological activity. Subtle environmental variations and changes influence the life in the lake and the structure of the microbial mats. The microbial mats are found in the less saline sector of Laguna Negra, implying that reduced salt stress favours their development.

Stromatolites have been found elsewhere in the Puna, at Socompa and Tolar Grande. They are considered to be among the oldest forms of life on Earth and a key indicator in the search for extraterrestrial life. The forms found at Laguna Negra resemble these of ancient Precambrian stromatolites (Note: Such as these of the Strelley Pool and Tumbiana Formations, both in Australia) more than these of recent Proterozoic stromatolites, and the conditions encountered at the lake may resemble these of Early Earth and Early Mars and could thus be used as an analogue to interpret deposits on Mars. Analyses of isotope fractionation processes at Laguna Negra also demonstrate that oxygen and carbon isotope variations are not necessarily proof of biological activity.

=== Microbes ===
Cyanobacteria and diatoms (Note: Diatom taxa vary between the various mat types. Taxa identified at Laguna Negra include Achnanthes brevipes sp., Brachisira sp., Campilodiscus sp., Denticula sp., Diploneis sp., Halamphora sp., Haloroundia speciosa, Mastogloia sp., Nitzschia sp., Navicula sp., Surirella sp. and Striatula sp.) form aggregates together and with other microorganisms (Note: Bacterial taxa vary between the various mat types. Taxa identified at Laguna Negra are Desulfobacteraceae, Flavobacteriaceae, Rhodothermaceae, Saprospiraceae, Spirochaetota, and Verrucomicrobiota, with Deinococcota and Bacillota less common). The aggregates in turn are embedded in exopolysaccharide capsules where carbonates precipitate. Living diatoms are often found at the margin of aggregates while their interiors feature "entombed" diatoms. The bacterial species Rivularia halophila was discovered at Laguna Negra; it is the first Rivularia species known from hypersaline inland waters. Another species identified and named (Note: The name Quechua: chiriqhucha means "cold/freezing lake/pond" in Quechua and refers to the cold environment of Laguna Negra.) there is Exiguobacterium chiriqhucha, although that species was originally discovered elsewhere.
