= Aracar =

Mountain in Argentina

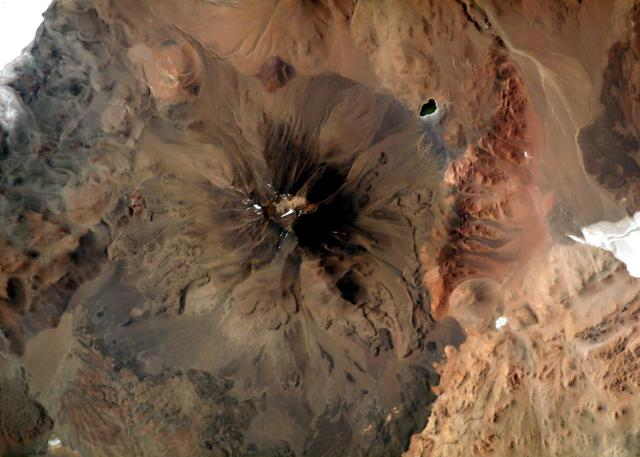
- Aracar from the Space Shuttle, January 2003

Highest point
- Elevation: 6,095 m (19,997 ft) (Note: Other elevation data are 6,075 metres (19,931 ft) from SRTM, 6,053 metres (19,859 ft) from ASTER and 6,121 metres (20,082 ft) from TanDEM-X. The nearest key col reaches 4,303 metres (14,117 ft) elevation, thus Aracar has a topographic prominence of 1,792 metres (5,879 ft) with a dominance of 29.4%. Its parent peak is Ojos del Salado and the Topographic isolation is 322.5 kilometres (200.4 mi).)
- Prominence: 1,791 m (5,876 ft)
- Parent peak: Ojos del Salado
- Listing: Ultra
- Coordinates: 24°17′24″S 67°47′00″W

Geography
- Location within Argentina
- Location: Argentina
- Parent range: Andes

Geology
- Rock age: Pliocene
- Mountain type: Stratovolcano
- Last eruption: 1993

Climbing
- First ascent: 04/01/1958 - Yosko Cvitanic (Yugoslavia), Gustav Lanstchner and Emo Henrich (Austria)

Aracar is a large conical stratovolcano in northwestern Argentina, just east of the Chilean border. It has a main summit crater about 1–1.5 kilometres (0.6–0.9 mi) in diameter and sometimes contains crater lakes and a secondary crater. The volcano has formed, starting during the Pliocene, on top of a lava platform and an older basement. Constructed on a base with an altitude of 4,100 metres (13,500 ft), it covers a surface area of 192.4 square kilometres (74.3 sq mi) and has a volume of 148 cubic kilometres (36 cu mi). The only observed volcanic activity was a possible steam or ash plume on March 28, 1993, seen from the village of Tolar Grande about 50 km (31 mi) southeast of the volcano, but with no evidence of deformation of the volcano from satellite observations. Inca archeological sites are found on the volcano.

== Geology ==
Aracar is located in the Salta province, north of the Salar de Taca Taca and Arizaro and east of the Salar de Incahuasi and the Sierra de Taca Taca, close to the Chilean border. The name is also spelled Arakar. Volcanoes in the territory rise above the endorheic sinks and landscape. Cerro Arizaro (9.0 ± 1.3 mya) is another volcano southeast of Aracar.

The basement consists of Paleozoic granites. The Laguna de Aracar Formation north of Aracar was formed by Gondwana volcanism and has been dated by K-Ar methods to be 266 ± 28 Ma old; it is associated with the Llullaillaco Unit. Tertiary sedimentary rocks in the east and arenites in the south form the rest of the basement. The volcano's height over the surrounding terrain is between 1,900–2,800 m (6,200–9,200 ft) from north to south.

Aracar is a polygenetic volcanic cone with a diameter of 13.5 km (8.4 mi) and a rectangular basis of 12–18 km (7.5–11.2 mi), covering a surface area of 192.4 km^{2} (74.3 sq mi). Four lava domes extend southeast from the volcano. Grey basaltic lava flows descend from its summit, forming a gentle western flank and much steeper eastern, northern, and southern flanks. West of the main summit, a 1–1.5 km (0.62–0.93 mi) wide and several hundred meters deep crater forms Aracar's main crater. Snowmelt occasionally forms small ephemeral lakes in the main crater. A 100 m (330 ft) shallow 10 m (33 ft) deep secondary crater is surmounted by a flat semilunar 15–20 m (49–66 ft) wide surface. Small southbound andesitic lava flows are associated with the main crater. There are traces of a sector collapse in form of an irregular landslide scar and a landslide deposit, but the landslide deposit may be associated with the collapse of Pular instead. Some deep gorges cut into the volcano, and erosion has removed 1.8 km^{3} (0.43 cu mi) of rock. Moraines, mainly occurring on the volcano's eastern side, descend to 4,500 metres (14,800 ft).

A lava field is found beneath the Aracar volcano. It is constructed by lava flows that range in composition from basaltic andesite bordering on trachyandesite over dacite and smaller flows of partially silicic magma. Basal lava flows are heavily eroded and reach 14 km (8.7 mi) in length and width in the south, decreasing from 4.5 km (2.8 mi) to 1.5 km (0.93 mi). They have cancelled out the prior landscape. These lower lava flows reach the Salar de Taca Taca and extend south-southeast. The main andesitic cone is 900 m (3,000 ft) high and 5 km (3.1 mi) wide, forming on top of older dacitic lava flows. The dacite flows which form the edifice's bulk are covered with debris and have flow fronts 20–40 m (66–131 ft) high. The lava field formed over a north-south slope.

Lavas have gray-black porphyric and in some places, vesicular textures. Andesine-labradorite plagioclase and pyroxene phenocrysts are found in the lavas, which have a fine-grained groundmass. Apatite, augite, and opaque mineral inclusions are also seen. Some lava flows display very small-scale flow bands with feldspat and plagioclase inclusions. Xenoliths containing quartz and gabbro nodules also play a part in the rock composition. The overall rock composition is calc-alkaline, similar to other magmas in the Central Volcanic Zone, with some intraplate and crustal components, with the magmas forming in an open magma chamber. Later magmas may have been influenced by the entry of basic magmas from the depth. The total volume of the edifice is about 148 cubic kilometres (36 cu mi).

The volcanic history of Aracar is poorly understood. The bottom lava flows have ages of 3.4 ± 1.2 to 2.6 ± 0.4 mya, but an age of 100,000 years has also been given. Presumably, at first, fluid basaltic lavas were erupted. Subsequently, dacite lavas erupted, accompanied by the formation of a strong slope in the edifice and hydrothermal activity at a northwestern lava dome. Finally, the central crater and andesite lava flows were erupted. Beneath 4,500 m (14,800 ft) altitude, lava flows are well conserved. No historical activity is recorded but in March 1993, inhabitants of Tolar Grande 50 km (31 mi) southeast of Aracar observed a high ash or steam column rising from Aracar, which may be either an eruption or the result of landslides. Satellite images did not detect edifice deformation during this episode, probably due to aliasing. Aracar is considered Argentina's 17th most dangerous volcano out of 38.

== History and human interaction ==
The mountain was climbed in 1958 by European climbers, including Mathias Rebitsch, who found an archeological site in the summit area. Minefield are present on the northeastern flanks of Aracar, making exploration from that side impossible. A major Inca archeological site is found in Aracar. Two separate places exist on the summit and secondary crater. The summit place is formed by a stone circle and low stone walls which are placed just above the slopes down into the main crater. A terrace-shaped stone structure forms the secondary crater, which is placed on its slopes. A smaller terrace is located on its northeastern side. Timber and wood are found around the stone structures. All these sites have no more than 5 m (16 ft) dimensions. These structures may be sanctuary sites that could be accessed by a bystanding public during ceremonies, with the sites themselves located within wind protected areas.

== See also ==
- List of volcanoes in Argentina
- List of Ultras of South America
- Ojos de Mar
- Pular
- Socompa
