= Mastogloia =

Scientific classification
- Domain: Eukaryota
- Clade: Sar
- Clade: Stramenopiles
- Division: Ochrophyta
- Clade: Diatomeae
- Class: Bacillariophyceae
- Order: Mastogloiales
- Family: Mastogloiaceae
- Genus: Mastogloia; G.H.K.Thwaites, 1856

Type species
- Mastogloia dansei Thwaites in W.Smith

Genus of algae

Mastogloia is a genus of diatoms belonging to the family Mastogloiaceae. The genus has cosmopolitan distribution, primarily in marine waters.

Members of this genus have complex silica chambers called partecta (singular partectum) along the sides of the first girdle band and are found only in the genus Mastogloia. Marine benthic diatoms of the genus Mastogloia are naviculoid (meaning they resemble diatoms of the genus Navicula) and symmetrical along the transapical axis. They prefer warm waters and are most commonly found in epipelic and epiphytic marine assemblages.

== Species ==
Sources:

- Mastogloia abnormis Al-Handal & Pennesi, 2016
- Mastogloia achnanthioides A.Mann, 1925
- Mastogloia acuta Grunow, 1883
- Mastogloia adriatica Voight, 1963
- Mastogloia affinis Cleve
- Mastogloia angulata F.W. Lewis
- Mastogloia apiculata W. Smith, 1856
- Mastogloia arabica Hendey, 1970
- Mastogloia (Orthoneis) aspera H. Peragallo and M. Peragallo, 1897
- Mastogloia asperula Grunow
- Mastogloia asperuloides Hustedt
- Mastogloia atacamae Hustedt, 1927
- Mastogloia baculus Hustedt, 1933
- Mastogloia bahamensis Cleve, 1895
- Mastogloia beaufortiana Hustedt, 1955
- Mastogloia belaensis Voigt
- Mastogloia bellatula Voigt, 1963
- Mastogloia biapiculata Hustedt, 1927
- Mastogloia binotata Cleve, 1895
- Mastogloia biocellata G. Novarino and A.R. Muftah
- Mastogloia brunii E.J.F. Wood,1961
- Mastogloia calcarea S.S.Lee, E.E.Gaiser, B.Van de Vijver, M.B.Edlund & S.A.Spaulding, 2014
- Mastogloia capitata Cleve, 1895
- Mastogloia chersonensis Schmidt, 1893
- Mastogloia closeii O'Meara, 1876
- Mastogloia cocconeiformis Grunow, 1860
- Mastogloia corallum Paddock & Kemp, 1988
- Mastogloia cucurbita Voigt, 1952
- Mastogloia cuspidata Cleve
- Mastogloia decipiens Hustedt, 1933
- Mastogloia decussata Grunow, 1892
- Mastogloia delicatissima Hustedt, 1933
- Mastogloia densestriata Hustedt, 1933
- Mastogloia depressa Hustedt, 1933
- Mastogloia dissimilis Hustedt, 1933
- Mastogloia dubitabilis Meister, 1937
- Mastogloia elegantula Hustedt, 1933
- Mastogloia elliptica Cleve, 1893
- Mastogloia emarginata Hustedt, 1925
- Mastogloia erythraea Grunow, 1860
- Mastogloia euxina Cleve, 1892
- Mastogloia exigua F.W. Lewis, 1861
- Mastogloia exilis Hustedt, 1933
- Mastogloia gieskesii Cholnoky, 1963
- Mastogloia gomphonemoides Hustedt, 1933
- Mastogloia gracilis Hustedt, 1933
- Mastogloia graciloides Hustedt, 1933
- Mastogloia grana Ricard, 1975
- Mastogloia grevillei W, Smith, 1856
- Mastogloia grunowii A. Schmidt, 1893
- Mastogloia halophila John, 1980
- Mastogloia horvathiana Grunow, 1860
- Mastogloia hulburti Carpenter, 1970
- Mastogloia hustedtii Meister, 1935
- Mastogloia ignorata Hustedt, 1933
- Mastogloia imperfecta Cleve, 1900
- Mastogloia indica Meister, 1932
- Mastogloia intrita Voigt, 1952
- Mastogloia jaoi Voigt, 1952
- Mastogloia jelineckiana Grunow, 1867
- Mastogloia kinkerii Pantocsek, 1892
- Mastogloia laminaris Grunow, 1883
- Mastogloia latecostata Hustedt, 1933
- Mastogloia linearis Simonsen, 1959
- Mastogloia lineata Cleve & Grove, 1891
- Mastogloia manguinii Cholnoky, 1968
- Mastogloia manokwariensis Cholnoky, 1963
- Mastogloia marginulata Grunow, 1867
- Mastogloia mauritiana Brun, 1893
- Mastogloia minuta 1856
- Mastogloia multiloculata Maillard, 1978
- Mastogloia muradii Voigt, 1956
- Mastogloia muralis Voigt, 1963
- Mastogloia nebulosa Voigt, 1952
- Mastogloia neoborneensis Pennesi & Totti, 2011
- Mastogloia neogena Pantocsek, 1892
- Mastogloia neorugosa Voigt, 1942
- Mastogloia nuiensis Ricard, 1975
- Mastogloia obesa Cleve, 1893
- Mastogloia obliqua Hagelstein, 1939
- Mastogloia occulta Voigt, 1952
- Mastogloia omissa Voigt, 1952
- Mastogloia ovalis A. Schmidt, 1893
- Mastogloia paradoxa Grunow, 1878
- Mastogloia parlibellioides Lobban & Pennesi, 2014
- Mastogloia peragalli Cleve, 1892
- Mastogloia pisciculus Cleve, 1893
- Mastogloia pseudoexigua Cholnoky, 1956
- Mastogloia pseudobalteata G. Novarino, 1989
- Mastogloia pseudoelegans Hustedt, 1955
- Mastogloia pseudolatericia Voigt, 1952
- Mastogloia pulchella Cleve, 1895
- Mastogloia pumila Cleve, 1895
- Mastogloia punctifera Brun, 1895
- Mastogloia quinquecostata Grunow, 1860
- Mastogloia recta Hustedt, 1942
- Mastogloia rectirobusta Gerd Moser, 1998
- Mastogloia regula Hustedt, 1933
- Mastogloia rhombica Cleve, 1883
- Mastogloia rhombus Cleve & Grove, 1891
- Mastogloia rimosa Cleve, 1893
- Mastogloia robusta Hustedt, 1933
- Mastogloia rostrata Hustedt, 1933
- Mastogloia sancti-johannis Hagelstein, 1939
- Mastogloia savensis Jurilj, 1957
- Mastogloia sergiana Pennesi & Poulin, 2012
- Mastogloia similis Hustedt, 1933
- Mastogloia simplex D. König, 1959
- Mastogloia singaporensis Voigt, 1942
- Mastogloia smith Thwaites
- Mastogloia subaffirmata Hustedt, 1927
- Mastogloia sublatericia Hustedt, 1933
- Mastogloia subrobusta Hustedt, 1942
- Mastogloia stellae C. Pennesi & M. Poulin, 2013
- Mastogloia stephensiana Yohn & Gibson, 1982
- Mastogloia strigilis Hustedt, 1933
- Mastogloia subaspera Hustedt, 1933
- Mastogloia tautirensis Ricard, 1975
- Mastogloia tenuis Hustedt, 1933
- Mastogloia tropica Hustedt, 1927
- Mastogloia undulata Grunow, 1860
- Mastogloia variabilis C.L. Graeff, J.P. Kociolek & S.R. Rushford, 2013
- Mastogloia vasta Hustedt, 1933
- Mastogloia vulnerata Voigt, 1952
