= Exiguobacterium undrae =

Scientific classification
- Domain: Bacteria
- Kingdom: Bacillati
- Phylum: Bacillota
- Class: Bacilli
- Order: Exiguobacteriales
- Family: Exiguobacteriaceae
- Genus: Exiguobacterium
- Species: E. undrae

Binomial name
- Exiguobacterium undrae Frühling et al. 2002

Species of bacteria

Exiguobacterium undrae is a bacterium. The DR14 strain of these bacteria has been found to eat polystyrene plastic. It was discovered in India, in wetlands by researchers in Shiv Nadar University. It was discovered alongside Exiguobacterium sibiricum strain DR11.
