= Dolomitization =

Geological process forming dolomite

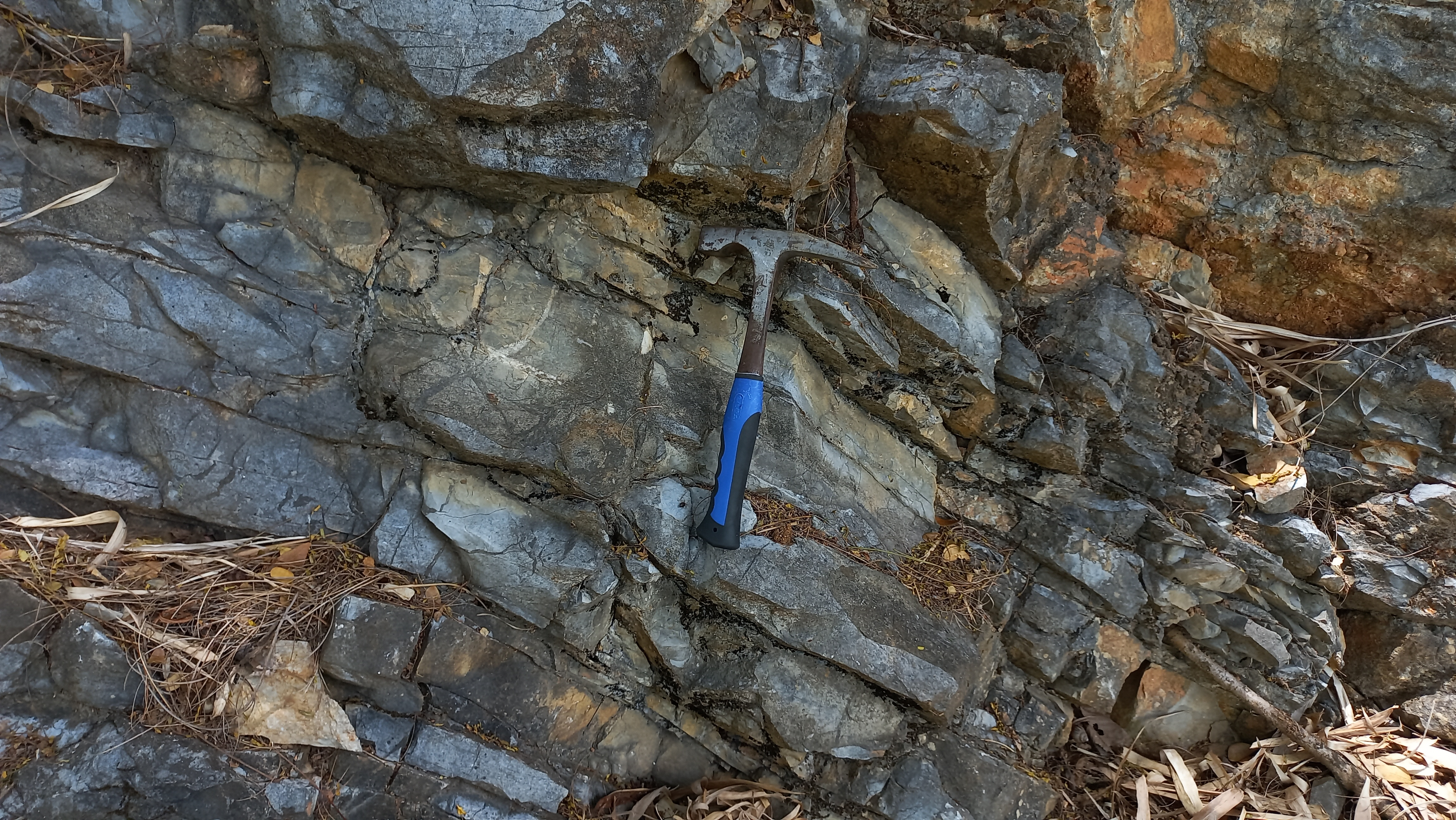
Sedimentary layers of dolomitized limestone in an outcrop in the Philippines

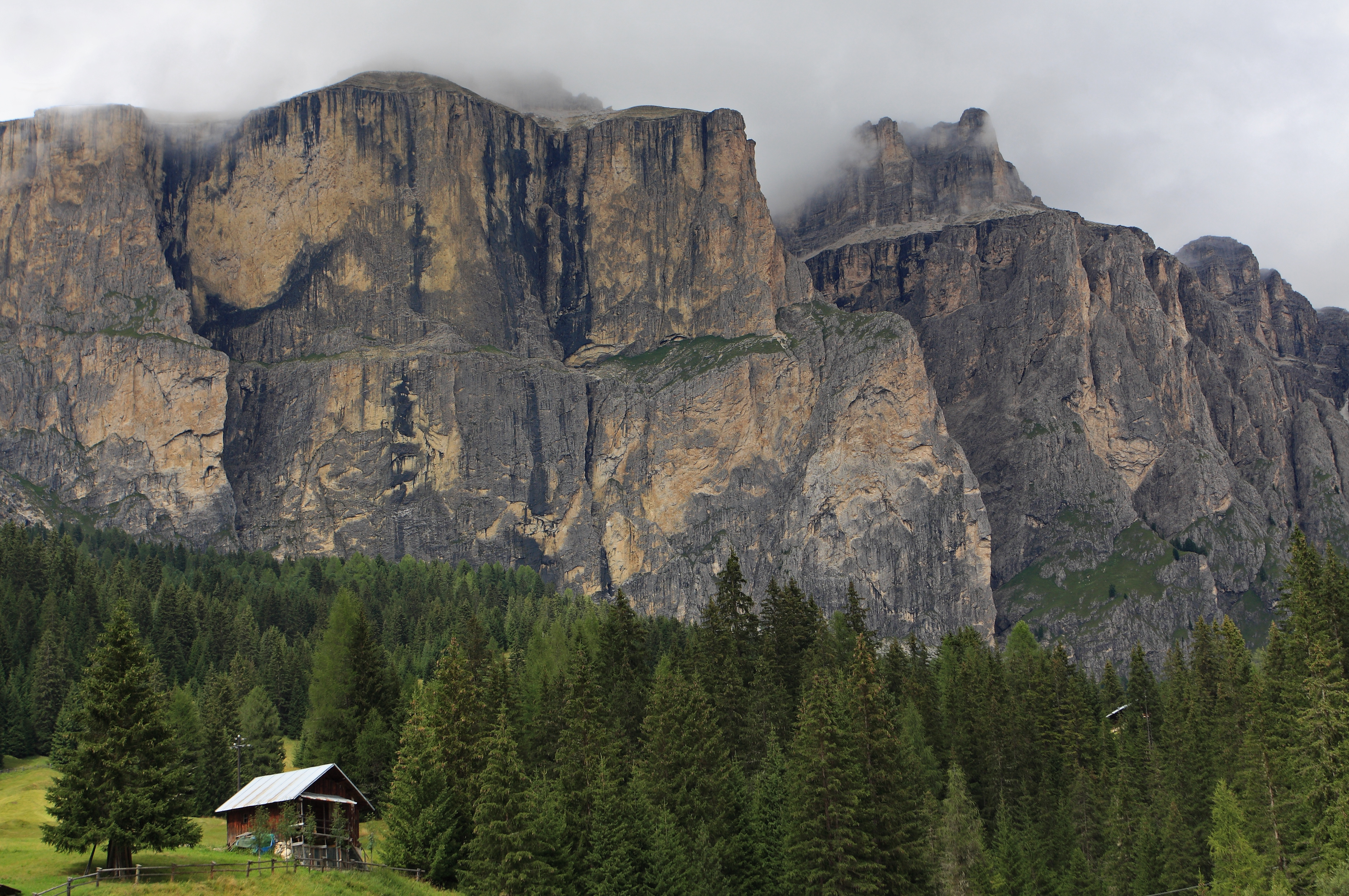
Mountains with dolomite rock formations in northern Italy

Dolomitization is a geological process where magnesium ions replace calcium ions in the mineral calcite, resulting in the formation of dolomite.

Dolomitization conditions are present in Abu Dhabi, the Mediterranean Sea, and some Brazilian hypersaline lagoons (most notably Lagoa Vermelha Lagoon). The areas where dolomitization take place are limited, as modern seawater is less suited to dolomite formation. This is evident in the noticeable decrease in modern dolomite depositions compared to older depositions. Dolomitization involves substantial recrystallization which can be described by the following equation:

2 CaCO_{3(calcite)} + Mg^{2+} ⇌ CaMg(CO_{3})_{2(dolomite)} + Ca^{2+}

The conditions for dolomitization depend on several factors, including temperature, saturation state, Mg:Ca ratio, and the presence of inhibitors and microorganisms.Microorganisms allow the precipitation of preliminary dolomite stages through certain metabolic pathways. Dolomitization occurs in kinetic intermediate stages. First, a protodolomite is formed, then it is transformed to dolomite in a dissolution-recrystallization process.

== Microbes and dolomitization ==
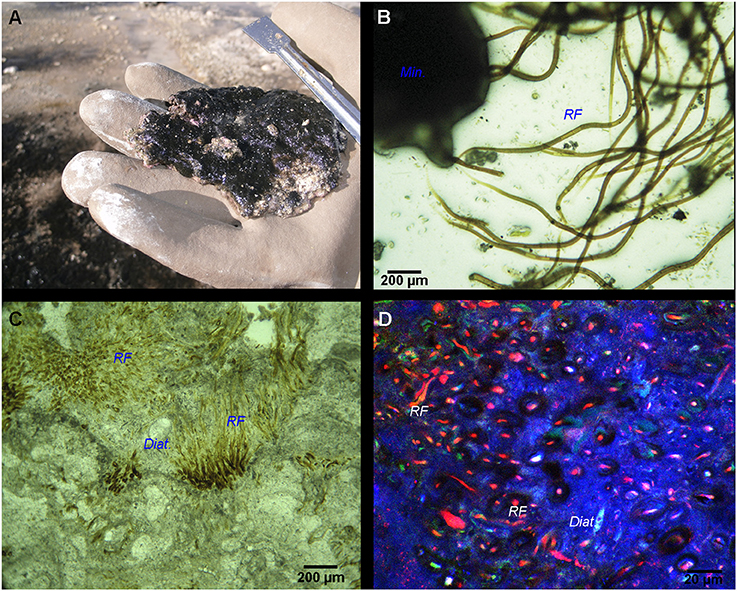
Microbial mats in Laguna Negra Lake, Argentina

Microorganisms allow the precipitation of dolomite by raising alkalinity and increasing pH buffering through metabolic pathways. Higher alkalinity leads to the transformation of HCO^{−}_{3} to CO^{2−}_{3}, which allows for interruption of the magnesium hydrate to form dolomite. In most modern dolomitization sites, ‘microbial mats’ are present. Microbial mats are populations of microorganisms and their associated extracellular polymeric substances (EPS). EPS groups have been shown to be critical for the formation of stable nuclei in the early stages of dolomite formation, thus increasing dolomite saturation.

There are several key metabolic pathways for dolomite formation. These include microbial sulfate reduction, aerobic heterotrophy, chemotrophic sulfide oxidation, and the coupling of methanogenesis and anaerobic methane oxidation.

=== Microbial sulfate reduction ===
Microbial sulfate reduction reduces sulfate concentrations in seawater, effectively removing one of the key inhibiting factors to dolomitization. This process also results in the production of sulfide ions, which promote Mg^{2+} dehydration.

=== Aerobic heterotrophy ===
Aerobic heterotrophy increases alkalinity by using nitrogen-rich organic matter as an electron acceptor.

=== Chemotrophic sulfate oxidation ===
In chemotrophic sulfide oxidation, organisms use sulfide for CO_{2} fixation, leading to seawater conditions that are thermodynamically favorable for dolomite formation.

=== Methanogenesis and anaerobic methane oxidation ===
Methanogenic archaea support dolomite formation through the coupling of methanogenesis and anaerobic methane oxidation. This coupling increases CO^{2−}_{3} concentration and sulfate reduction, leading to increased dolomite saturation.

== Inhibitors to dolomitization ==
=== Mg^{2+} hydration ===
Mg^{2+} hydration inhibits dolomitization because in ambient conditions, the closeness of water molecules and magnesium ions reduces the ease at which Mg^{2+} enters the carbonate lattice. This can be partially overcome with the help of microorganisms.

=== Sulfate presence ===
Presence of sulfate results in tight ion-pairs of SO^{2−}_{4} and Mg^{2+}, preventing magnesium from joining the dolomite crystal lattice. It has been suggested that this effect is less strong at lower temperatures.

=== Low carbonate activity ===
In modern seawater, carbonate ion concentration is lower compared to Mg^{2+} concentration.

== The dolomite problem ==
The 'dolomite problem' refers to the fact that dolomite is difficult to precipitate experimentally in ambient conditions and that it precipitates at a starkly lower rate in the modern ocean compared to geologic history (despite modern seawater’s supersaturation of dolomite). Ordered dolomite can be produced in a lab at high temperatures. Past laboratory experiments have sought to produce dolomite in ambient conditions, however the resulting products lacked cation ordering, indicating the product was not strictly dolomite, but disordered dolomite. A recent study claims to have produced an ordered dolomite by fluctuating between supersaturated and undersaturated states. This cycle has long been hypothesized to drive structural ordering and phase transformations in carbonate minerals. Subsequent undersaturation dissolves the disordered crystals and allows for increased order when precipitated again. Modern dolomitization zones frequently experience alternating periods with and without rain, which in turn allows for fluctuation in saturation state. Saturation fluctuations can increase dolomite precipitation up to 7 orders of magnitude. The experimental validity of the proposed mechanism remains disputed. Proof-of-concept experiments conducted at temperatures possibly exceeding 80 °C, using liquid-cell transmission electron microscopy, did not provide conclusive evidence of dolomite formation under pulsed undersaturation conditions. Subsequent crystallographic reassessment questioned the indexing of the reported electron diffraction pattern, noting that the reflection interpreted as evidence of cation ordering is incompatible with dolomite. The observed overgrowth may instead represent Mg-bearing calcite formed epitaxially on a pre-existing dolomite substrate.

== See also ==
- Diagenesis
- Dolomite (rock)
