= Aneumastus =

Scientific classification
- Domain: Eukaryota
- Clade: Diaphoretickes
- Clade: SAR
- Clade: Stramenopiles
- Phylum: Gyrista
- Subphylum: Ochrophytina
- Class: Bacillariophyceae
- Order: Mastogloiales
- Family: Mastogloiaceae
- Genus: Aneumastus; D.G.Mann & A.J.Stickle, 1990

Genus of algae

Aneumastus is a genus of diatom belonging to the family Mastogloiaceae.

Species:

- Aneumastus aksaraiensis S.A.Spalding, A.Akbulut & Kociolek
- Aneumastus albanicus Lange-Bertalot & Miho
- Aneumastus apiculatus (Østrup) Lange-Bertalot
