= Exiguobacterium oxidotolerans =

Scientific classification
- Domain: Bacteria
- Kingdom: Bacillati
- Phylum: Bacillota
- Class: Bacilli
- Order: Bacillales
- Family: Bacillaceae
- Genus: Exiguobacterium
- Species: E. oxidotolerans

Binomial name
- Exiguobacterium oxidotolerans Yumoto et al. 2004

Type strain
- T-2-2

Species of bacteria

Exiguobacterium oxidotolerans is a Gram-positive, alkaliphilic, facultative anaerobic and motile bacterium from the genus of Exiguobacterium which has been isolated from a fish processing plant.
