= Santa Rosa de los Pastos Grandes =

Coordinates: 24°27′S 66°42′W

- Municipality and village
- Interactive map of Santa Rosa de los Pastos Grandes
- Country: Argentina
- Province: Salta
- Department: Los Andes
- Time zone: UTC−3 (ART)

Santa Rosa de los Pastos Grandes is a village and rural municipality in Salta Province in northwestern Argentina.

== See also ==
- Salta–Antofagasta railway
