= Exiguobacterium aestuarii =

Scientific classification
- Domain: Bacteria
- Kingdom: Bacillati
- Phylum: Bacillota
- Class: Bacilli
- Order: Bacillales
- Family: Bacillaceae
- Genus: Exiguobacterium
- Species: E. aestuarii

Binomial name
- Exiguobacterium aestuarii Kim et al. 2005

Type strain
- TF-16

Synonyms
- Exiguobacterium gaetbuli

Species of bacteria

Exiguobacterium aestuarii is a Gram-variable and rod-shaped bacterium from the genus of Exiguobacterium which has been isolated from tidal flat from the beach of Daepo in Korea.
