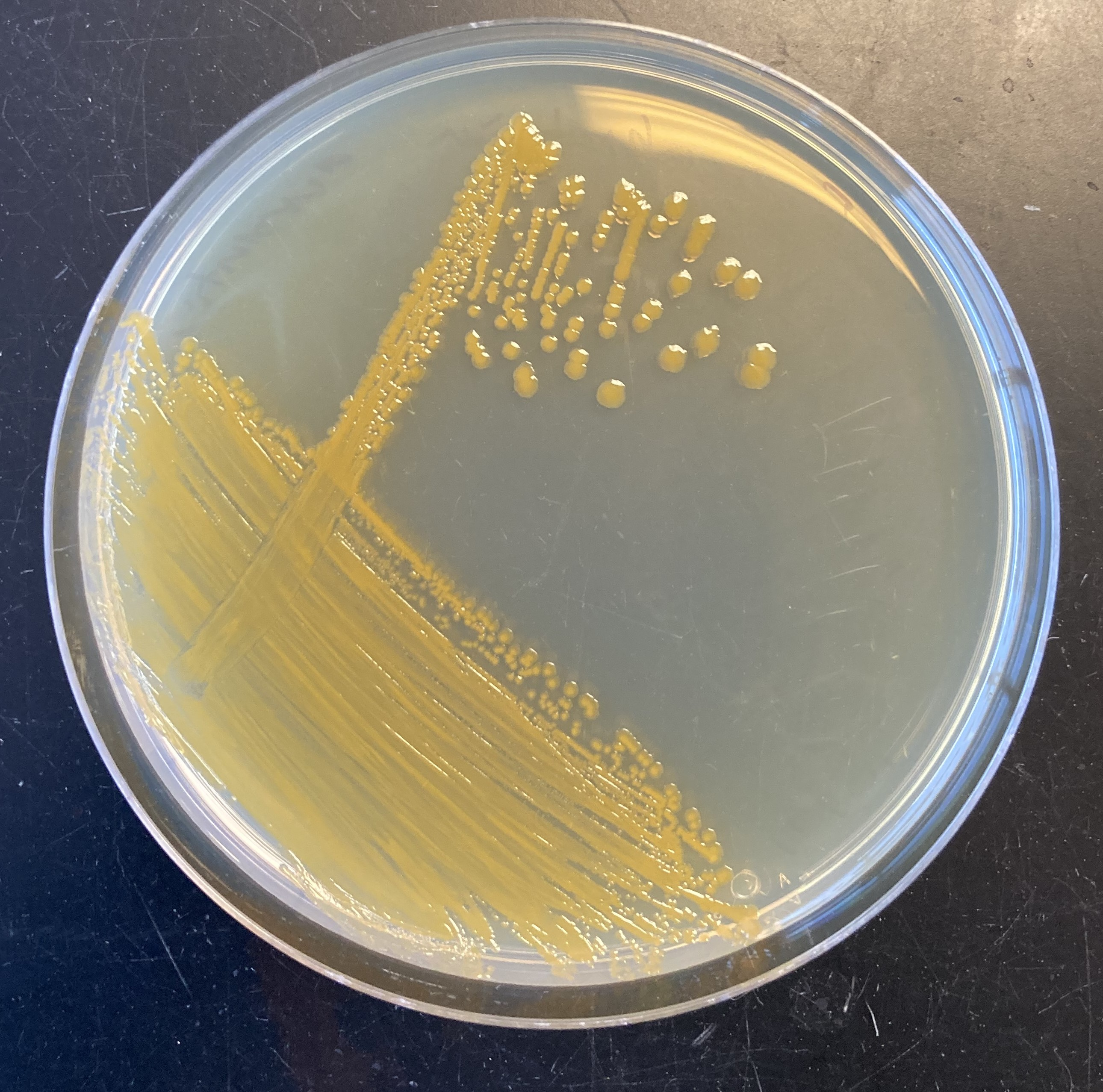

Scientific classification
- Domain: Bacteria
- Kingdom: Bacillati
- Phylum: Bacillota
- Class: Bacilli
- Order: Exiguobacteriales
- Family: Exiguobacteriaceae
- Genus: Exiguobacterium
- Species: E. aurantiacum

Binomial name
- Exiguobacterium aurantiacum Collins et al. 1984

= Exiguobacterium aurantiacum =

Species of bacteria

Exiguobacterium aurantiacum is a Gram-positive, alkaliphilic, halotolerant, and non-spore-forming bacterium. Exiguobacterium spp. are facultative anaerobes that have been isolated from a broad range of environments with Exiguobacterium aurantiacum, the type species, being isolated from alkaline potato-processing effluent in 1980. E. aurantiacum has been evaluated for use in bioremediation and as a source for natural pigments. Two case studies have associated E. aurantiacum with infections in humans.

== Name and classification ==
The name Exiguobacterium aurantiacum derives from the Latin exiguus meaning "small" or "slender" and aurantiacus meaning "orange-colored". Exiguobacterium is one of 122 genera within the Bacillaceae family. As of 2024, the Exiguobacterium genus now hosts 19 species recognized by the International Code of Nomenclature of Prokaryotes (ICNP).

== History ==
The classification, Exiguobacterium aurantiacum, was first assigned in 1983 by Collins et al. after five alkaliphilic bacteria were isolated from potato-processing effluent by Gee et al. in 1980. The first genome was made available in 2014 by the U.S. Department of Energy Joint Genome Institute. The E. aurantiacum DSM 6208 genome is composed of 3.04 Mbp with a GC content of 53%. Of note, the genome was found to have 90 transposases and two cold shock genes.

== Description ==
Exiguobacterium aurantiacum cells are pleomorphic, ranging from (~3.2 μm) rods in exponential phase to short (~1.2 μm) coccobacilli in stationary phase. Cells are gram-positive, motile, and do not form spores. E. aurantiacum is classified as a facultative anaerobe able to grow on a range of sugars including, but not limited to, glucose, sucrose, and galactose. Colonies grown aerobically on Van Niel's Yeast Agar are glossy with a honey-orange pigment.

== Application ==
Exiguobacterium aurantiacum cells contain a bright orange carotenoid pigment that has been evaluated as a potential natural pigment source in industry. E. aurantiacum has also been evaluated for its ability to degrade n-alkanes from diesel. Thus, E. aurantiacum could be used for bioremediation in oil-contaminated environments. Additionally, E. aurantiacum has been found to produce a thermostable protease that functions in alkaline environments.

== Opportunistic infections ==
Exiguobacterium aurantiacum has been associated with bacteremia in one case study after it was isolated from six human patients with three of the patients being in an immunocompromised state. Prior to this case study, E. aurantiacum was linked to one other infection, a case of periodontitis, in 2003.
