= Exiguobacterium enclense =

Scientific classification
- Domain: Bacteria
- Kingdom: Bacillati
- Phylum: Bacillota
- Class: Bacilli
- Order: Bacillales
- Family: Bacillaceae
- Genus: Exiguobacterium
- Species: E. enclense

Binomial name
- Exiguobacterium enclense Dastager et al. 2015

Type strain
- NIO-1109

Species of bacteria

Exiguobacterium enclense is a Gram-positive bacterium from the genus of Exiguobacterium which has been isolated from marine sediments from the Chorão island.
