= Exiguobacterium soli =

Scientific classification
- Domain: Bacteria
- Kingdom: Bacillati
- Phylum: Bacillota
- Class: Bacilli
- Order: Bacillales
- Family: Bacillaceae
- Genus: Exiguobacterium
- Species: E. soli

Binomial name
- Exiguobacterium soli Chaturvedi et al. 2008

Type strain
- DVS 3Y

Species of bacteria

Exiguobacterium soli is a psychrophilic bacterium from the genus of Exiguobacterium which has been isolated from the McMurdo Dry Valleys.
