= Exiguobacterium undae =

Scientific classification
- Domain: Bacteria
- Kingdom: Bacillati
- Phylum: Bacillota
- Class: Bacilli
- Order: Exiguobacteriales
- Family: Exiguobacteriaceae
- Genus: Exiguobacterium
- Species: E. undae

Binomial name
- Exiguobacterium undae Frühling et al., 2002

Species of bacterium

Exiguobacterium undae is a species of Bacilli. Its discovery was published in the International Journal of Systematic and Evolutionary Microbiology (Frühling et al., 2002). This species has the ability to metabolize arabinose, cellulose, fructose, and glucose. It may undergo fermentation by utilizing D-glucose, D-mannitol, D-ribose, and glycogen (Bacdive 2021). E. undae is motile and it contains peritrichous flagella.

== Physiology ==
E. undae was first sampled from the surface of a garden pond in Wolfenbuttel, Lower Saxony, Germany (Frühling et al., 2002). The pond water containing this species was streaked by researchers onto glucose sulfide (GS) medium (DSMZ 851). Four strains, L1-L4, were acquired from the garden pond and successfully isolated in tryptone soy agar at room temperature (Frühling et al., 2002). E. undae is a Gram-positive, rod-shaped bacterium that is motile and yellow-orange in color (Bacdive 2021). It is facultatively anaerobic and catalase- and oxidase-positive (Frühling et al., 2002). After 2 days of incubation at 25°C, 2-3 mm surface colonies of the E. undae can form on tryptone soy agar; the colonies are convex, entire, and shiny (Frühling et al., 2002).

== Ecology ==
The genus Exiguobacteria has been detected from water and soil samples on all continents. Strain DR14 of this species was isolated from Dadri wetlands in India (Chauhan et al., 2018). Certain strains have been shown to be able to grow in soils that contain high concentrations of cadmium and immobilize it, which displays some potential for their use in bioremediation (Kumar et al., 2014).

== Special features ==
E. undae strain DR14 have the ability to degrade polystyrene (PS) and use it as a carbon source by initiating biofilm formation (Chauhan et al., 2018). Researchers incubated the bacterium in the presence of PS for 20 days and demonstrated that the PS had been biodegraded by measuring the water contact angle of the material after incubation (Chauhan et al., 2018). This finding suggests that DR14 can change the surface characteristics of PS to make it easier to colonize and metabolize.
