= Exiguobacterium profundum =

Scientific classification
- Domain: Bacteria
- Kingdom: Bacillati
- Phylum: Bacillota
- Class: Bacilli
- Order: Bacillales
- Family: Bacillaceae
- Genus: Exiguobacterium
- Species: E. profundum

Binomial name
- Exiguobacterium profundum Crapart et al. 2007

Type strain
- 10C

Synonyms
- Exiguobacterium lactigenes

Species of bacteria

Exiguobacterium profundum is a Gram-positive, halotolerant, facultative anaerobic, moderately thermophilic and non-spore-forming bacterium from the genus of Exiguobacterium which has been isolade from a hydrothermal vent from the East Pacific Rise.
