= Exiguobacterium antarcticum =

Scientific classification
- Domain: Bacteria
- Kingdom: Bacillati
- Phylum: Bacillota
- Class: Bacilli
- Order: Bacillales
- Family: Bacillaceae
- Genus: Exiguobacterium
- Species: E. antarcticum

Binomial name
- Exiguobacterium antarcticum Frühling et al. 2002

Synonyms
- Exiguobacterium aff. acetylicum

Species of bacterium

Exiguobacterium antarcticum is a bacterium from the genus of Exiguobacterium which has been isolated from a biofilm from the Ginger Lake from the King George Island.
