= Exiguobacterium marinum =

Scientific classification
- Domain: Bacteria
- Kingdom: Bacillati
- Phylum: Bacillota
- Class: Bacilli
- Order: Bacillales
- Family: Bacillaceae
- Genus: Exiguobacterium
- Species: E. marinum

Binomial name
- Exiguobacterium marinum Kim et al. 2005

Type strain
- KCTC 19036

Species of bacteria

Exiguobacterium marinum is a bacterium from the genus of Exiguobacterium.
