= Mina La Casualidad =

Coordinates: 25°04′S 68°14′W

- Municipality and village
- Interactive map of Mina La Casualidad
- Country: Argentina
- Province: Salta
- Department: Los Andes
- Elevation: 13,000 ft (4,000 m)
- Time zone: UTC−3 (ART)

Mina La Casualidad is an abandoned mine and ghost town in Salta Province in northwestern Argentina.

== Climate ==
Mina La Casualidad has a Tundra climate (Köppen ET). It is possibly the Argentine settlement with the lowest annual precipitation.

Climate data for Mina La Casualidad (1956–1976)
Month	Jan	Feb	Mar	Apr	May	Jun	Jul	Aug	Sep	Oct	Nov	Dec	Year
Record high °C (°F)	25.0 (77.0)	23.0 (73.4)	21.5 (70.7)	20.5 (68.9)	16.0 (60.8)	13.0 (55.4)	13.5 (56.3)	17.0 (62.6)	19.0 (66.2)	19.9 (67.8)	20.5 (68.9)	25.0 (77.0)	25.0 (77.0)
Mean daily maximum °C (°F)	18.3 (64.9)	18.6 (65.5)	16.4 (61.5)	12.9 (55.2)	9.5 (49.1)	6.3 (43.3)	5.7 (42.3)	8.7 (47.7)	12.8 (55.0)	14.3 (57.7)	15.9 (60.6)	18.1 (64.6)	13.1 (55.6)
Daily mean °C (°F)	9.7 (49.5)	9.5 (49.1)	7.4 (45.3)	4.1 (39.4)	1.3 (34.3)	−1.5 (29.3)	−2.1 (28.2)	0.2 (32.4)	3.7 (38.7)	5.6 (42.1)	7.5 (45.5)	9.1 (48.4)	4.5 (40.1)
Mean daily minimum °C (°F)	1.0 (33.8)	0.4 (32.7)	−1.6 (29.1)	−4.8 (23.4)	−6.9 (19.6)	−9.3 (15.3)	−9.9 (14.2)	−8.3 (17.1)	−5.4 (22.3)	−3.0 (26.6)	−0.9 (30.4)	0.2 (32.4)	−4.0 (24.8)
Record low °C (°F)	−4.8 (23.4)	−4.0 (24.8)	−10.0 (14.0)	−19.0 (−2.2)	−22.0 (−7.6)	−20.0 (−4.0)	−21.0 (−5.8)	−24.0 (−11.2)	−18.3 (−0.9)	−12.0 (10.4)	−8.0 (17.6)	−6.0 (21.2)	−24.0 (−11.2)
Average precipitation mm (inches)	8.4 (0.33)	4.7 (0.19)	1.3 (0.05)	0.6 (0.02)	2.8 (0.11)	3.3 (0.13)	3.9 (0.15)	3.0 (0.12)	4.3 (0.17)	0.1 (0.00)	0.6 (0.02)	4.8 (0.19)	37.9 (1.49)
Average relative humidity (%)	28	27	29	33	36	41	45	39	36	31	27	27	33
Source 1: Servicio Meteorológico Nacional
Source 2: Secretaria de Mineria (humidity)

== See also ==
- Salar de Arizaro
- Salta–Antofagasta railway
