= Exiguobacterium alkaliphilum =

Scientific classification
- Domain: Bacteria
- Kingdom: Bacillati
- Phylum: Bacillota
- Class: Bacilli
- Order: Bacillales
- Family: Bacillaceae
- Genus: Exiguobacterium
- Species: E. alkaliphilum

Binomial name
- Exiguobacterium alkaliphilum Kulshreshtha et al. 2013

Strains
- Type strain - 12/1

Species of bacterium

Exiguobacterium alkaliphilum is a Gram-positive, rod-shaped, facultatively anaerobic and alkaliphilic bacterium from the genus of Exiguobacterium which has been isolated from alkaline wastewater drained sludge from New Delhi.
