= Exiguobacterium artemiae =

Scientific classification
- Domain: Bacteria
- Kingdom: Bacillati
- Phylum: Bacillota
- Class: Bacilli
- Order: Bacillales
- Family: Bacillaceae
- Genus: Exiguobacterium
- Species: E. artemiae

Binomial name
- Exiguobacterium artemiae López-Cortés et al. 2006

Type strain
- 9AN

Species of bacteria

Exiguobacterium artemiae is a Gram-positive bacterium from the genus of Exiguobacterium which has been isolated from the shrimp Artemia franciscana.
