= Exiguobacterium acetylicum =

Scientific classification
- Domain: Bacteria
- Kingdom: Bacillati
- Phylum: Bacillota
- Class: Bacilli
- Order: Bacillales
- Family: Bacillaceae
- Genus: Exiguobacterium
- Species: E. acetylicum

Binomial name
- Exiguobacterium acetylicum (Levine and Soppeland 1926) Farrow et al. 1994

Type strain
- ATCC953

Synonyms
- Brevibacterium acetylicum

Species of bacteria

Exiguobacterium acetylicum is a bacterium from the genus of Exiguobacterium.
