= Exiguobacterium aquaticum =

Scientific classification
- Domain: Bacteria
- Kingdom: Bacillati
- Phylum: Bacillota
- Class: Bacilli
- Order: Bacillales
- Family: Bacillaceae
- Genus: Exiguobacterium
- Species: E. aquaticum

Binomial name
- Exiguobacterium aquaticum Raichand et al. 2012

Strains
- IMTB-3094

Synonyms
- Exiguobacterium aquarius

Species of bacterium

Exiguobacterium aquaticum is a Gram-positive, short rod-shaped and motile bacterium from the genus of Exiguobacterium which has been isolated from water from the Tikkar Tal Lake in Haryana.
