= Exiguobacterium sibiricum =

Scientific classification
- Domain: Bacteria
- Kingdom: Bacillati
- Phylum: Bacillota
- Class: Bacilli
- Order: Exiguobacteriales
- Family: Exiguobacteriaceae
- Genus: Exiguobacterium
- Species: E. sibiricum

Binomial name
- Exiguobacterium sibiricum Rodrigues et al. 2006

Species of bacteria

Exiguobacterium sibiricum is a bacterium. The DR11 strain of these bacteria has been found to eat polystyrene. It was discovered in India, in wetlands by researchers in Shiv Nadar University. It was discovered alongside Exiguobacterium undrae strain DR14.
