= Ojos de Mar =

Lakes in Argentina

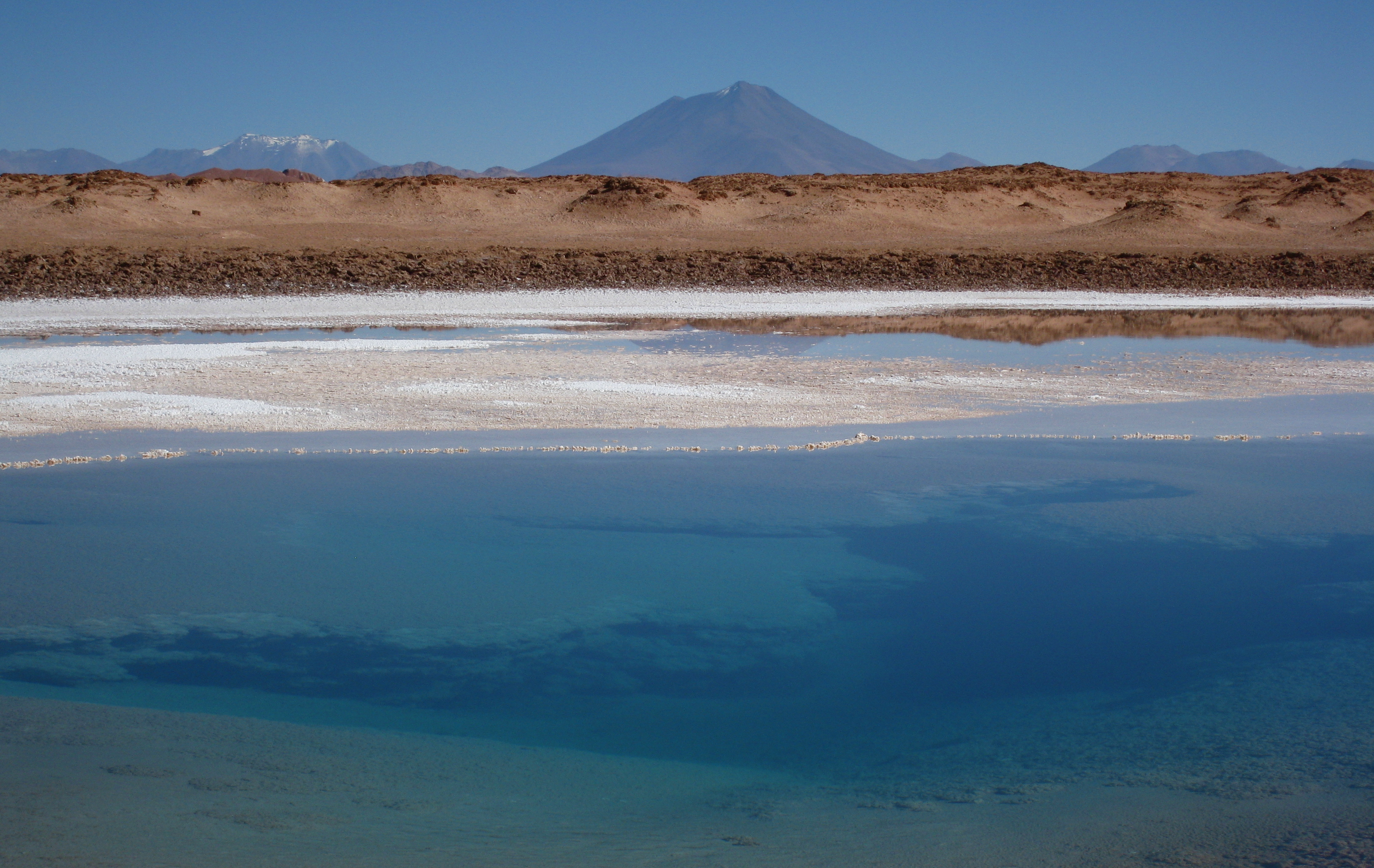
- Ojos de Mar. Aracar mountain rises in the background.

- Location within Argentina
- Coordinates: 24.6237°S 67.3711°W

Ojos de Mar is a group of 3–6 small water bodies close to the town of Tolar Grande in Argentina and an important tourist attraction there. They are inhabited by extremophile microorganisms of interest to biotechnology; stromatolites have also been found there.

== The lakes ==
The Ojos de Mar are six or three small 3–8-metre (9.8–26.2 ft) deep ponds characterized by a blue-turquoise colour in a white salty desert landscape under a bright blue sky. Their water is extremely salty and alkaline and their colour changes depending on the angle of the sun impacting the clear waters. The water bodies are filled by water coming from surrounding rocks that evaporates in the Ojos de Mar. The name may refer to the colour and saltiness of the water that resembles the sea; it is possible that the water bodies were encountered by the Spanish on their way through the Andes. They are also referred to as Ojo de Tolar. Despite their name and appearance, they are not remnants of the sea. Water temperatures of 14 °C (57 °F) have been measured. The turquoise colour is due to sunlight reflected from the floor of the waterbodies. The occurrence of gypsum and halite has been reported.

The Ojos de Mar are one of the main tourist attractions of Tolar Grande and are of scientific interest due to the stromatoliths that grow there; stromatoliths are the oldest traces of life on the planet and at least 3.4 billion years ago helped give rise to the oxygen in the atmosphere; this 2009 discovery of stromatoliths at Ojos de Mar has gained media attention and in 2011 it led to the Ojos de Mar along with Laguna Socompa where similar stromatoliths occur to be declared a protected area by the government of the Salta Province.

They lie at elevations of 3,510 metres (11,520 ft) 4 kilometres (2.5 mi) from the town of Tolar Grande (380 kilometres (240 mi) west from the city of Salta; the Tren a las Nubes tourist train passes through Tolar Grande) in the Salta Province of Argentina, and can be reached from Tolar Grande through a road and a parking lot. The environment of the waterbodies is fragile and thus visitors are discouraged from approaching too closely, also because the ground is unstable. Other tourist attractions of Tolar Grande are the volcanoes Llullaillaco and Socompa and the Cono de Arita. Vegetation in the area includes tola and yareta; animals reported from there include vicuñas.

== Biotechnological significance ==
The Ojos de Mar display a rich assembly of microorganisms including extremophiles in their waters which have been analyzed with bioinformatics methods. The ecosystem has been classified as a "gypsum evaporite microbial ecosystem"; these are biofilms or endolithic microbial ecosystems associated with evaporite deposits with endolithic systems dominating at Ojos de Mar. In general, the Argentine Puna in South America features a number of high altitude lakes between 3,000 and 6,000 metres (9,800 and 19,700 ft) elevation which are characterized by extreme environmental conditions: Extremely high insolation by the sun, low temperatures, large temperature changes between day and night, extremely high salinity of their waters owing to high evaporation rates and accumulation of toxic elements such as arsenic. Because of this, plants and animals are rare in these areas and extremophile microorganisms which can tolerate the extreme conditions make up much of the biota. These in turn could be used to obtain enzymes that could be useful for industrial processes, such as ultraviolet radiation-resistant or -exploiting enzymes like photolyases and antioxidants that protect cells from oxidative damage; these compounds and proteins could be used in medicine and the cosmetic industry.

== Gallery ==
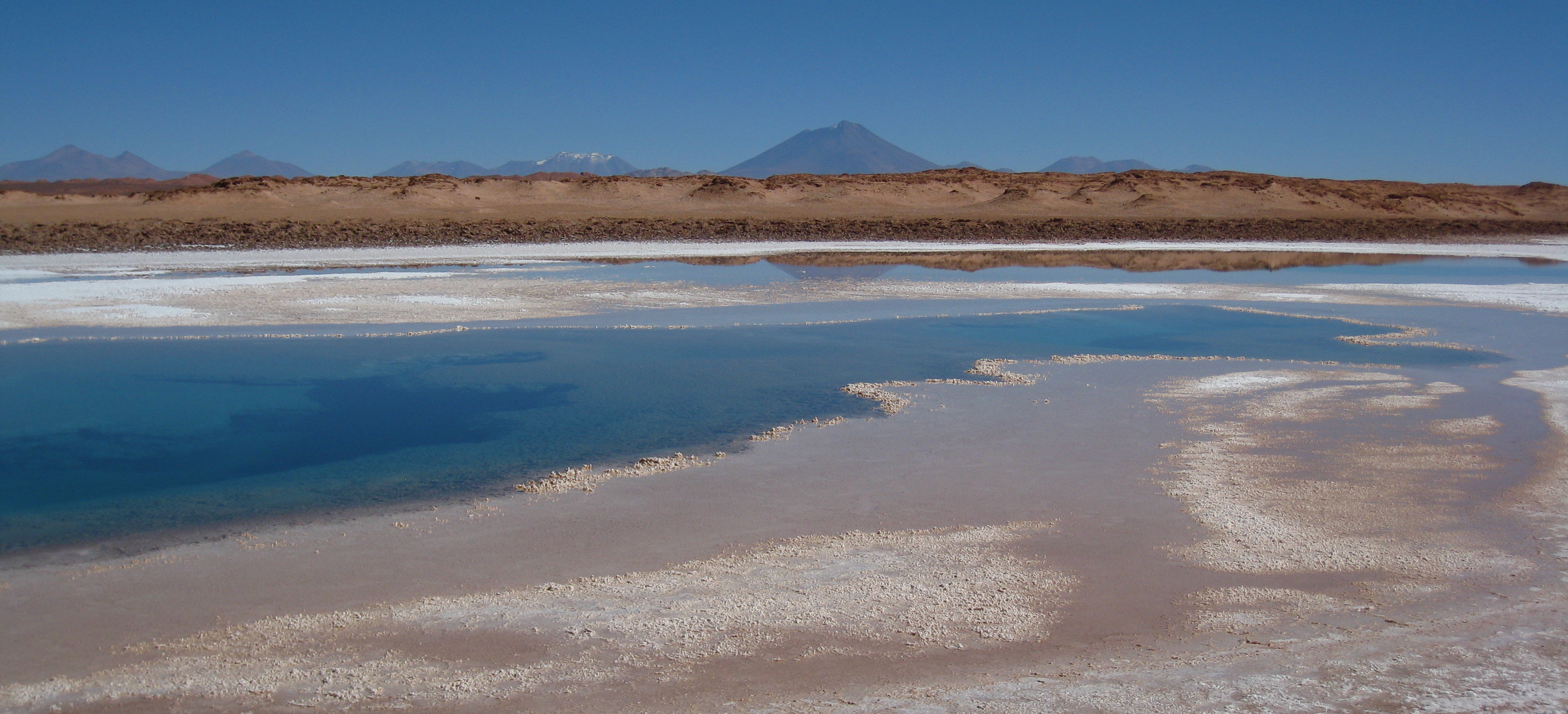
Ojos de Mar. Aracar volcano rises in the background

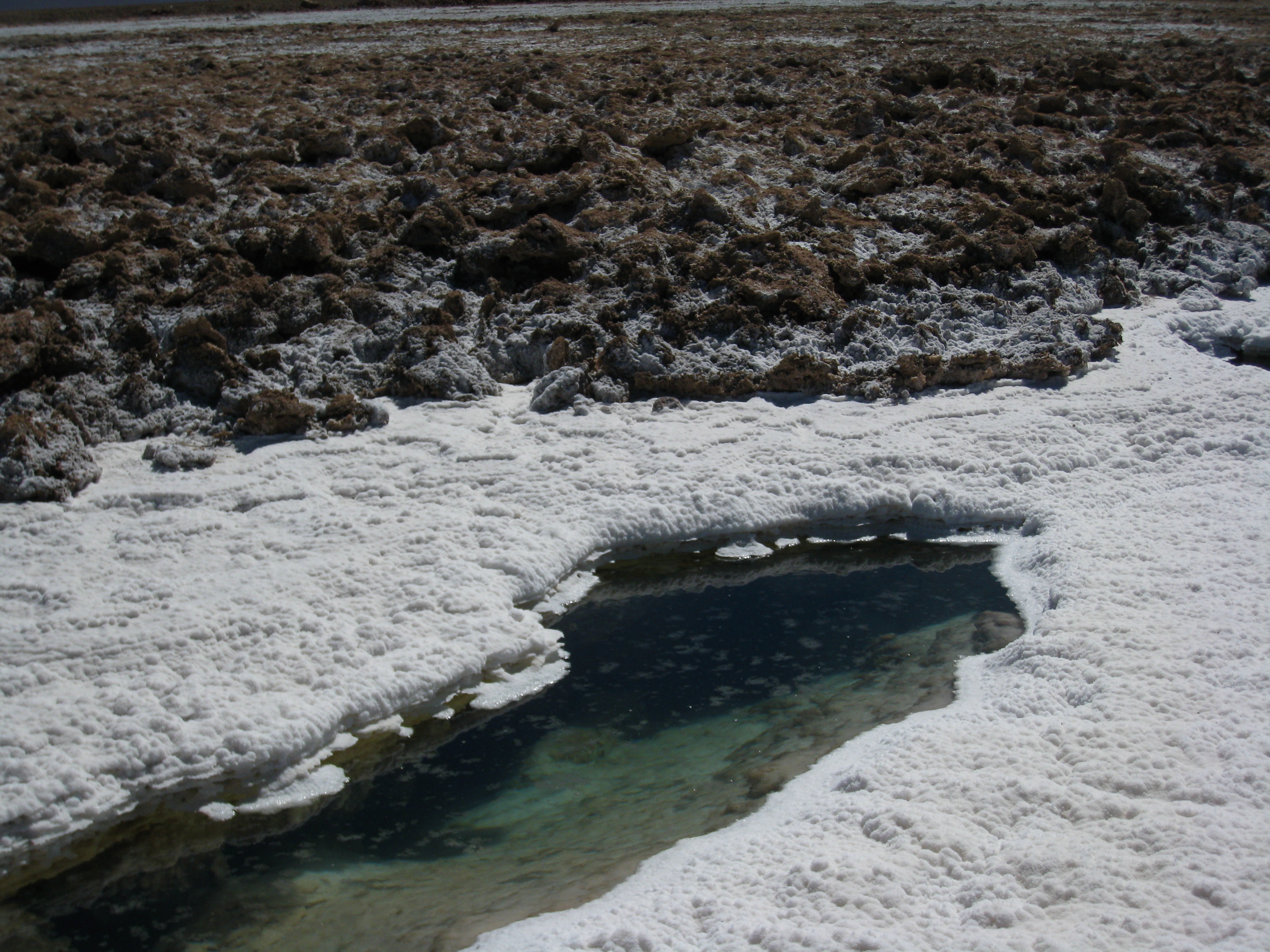
A smaller pond

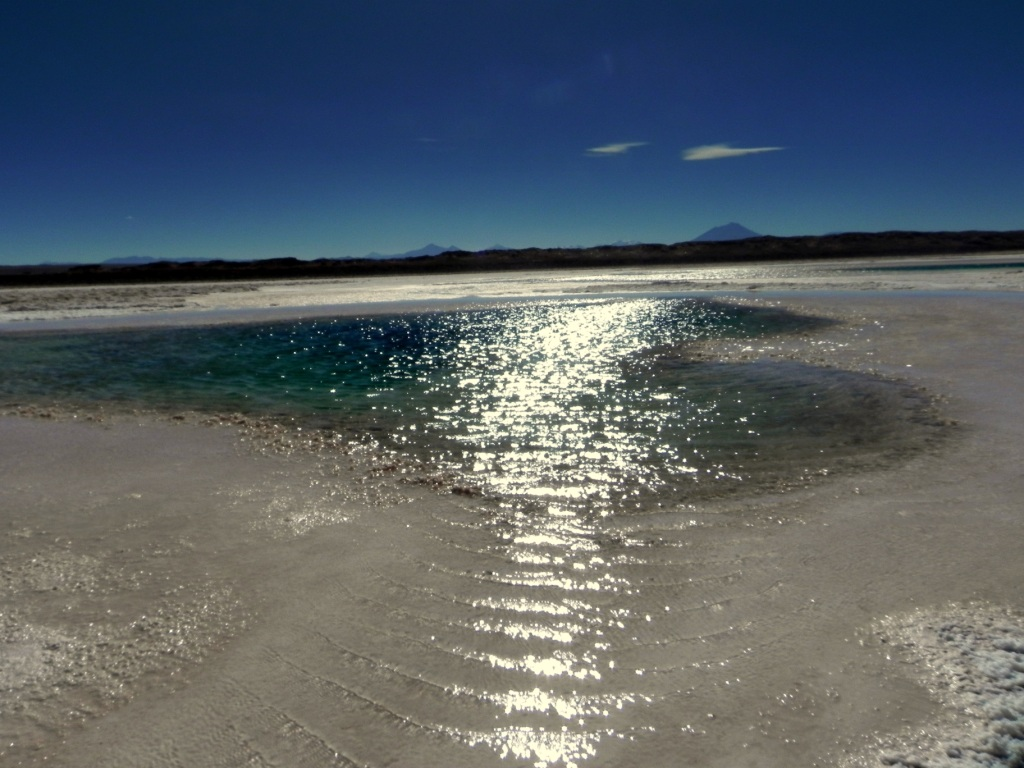
The water surface of Ojo de Mar below the sunny sky

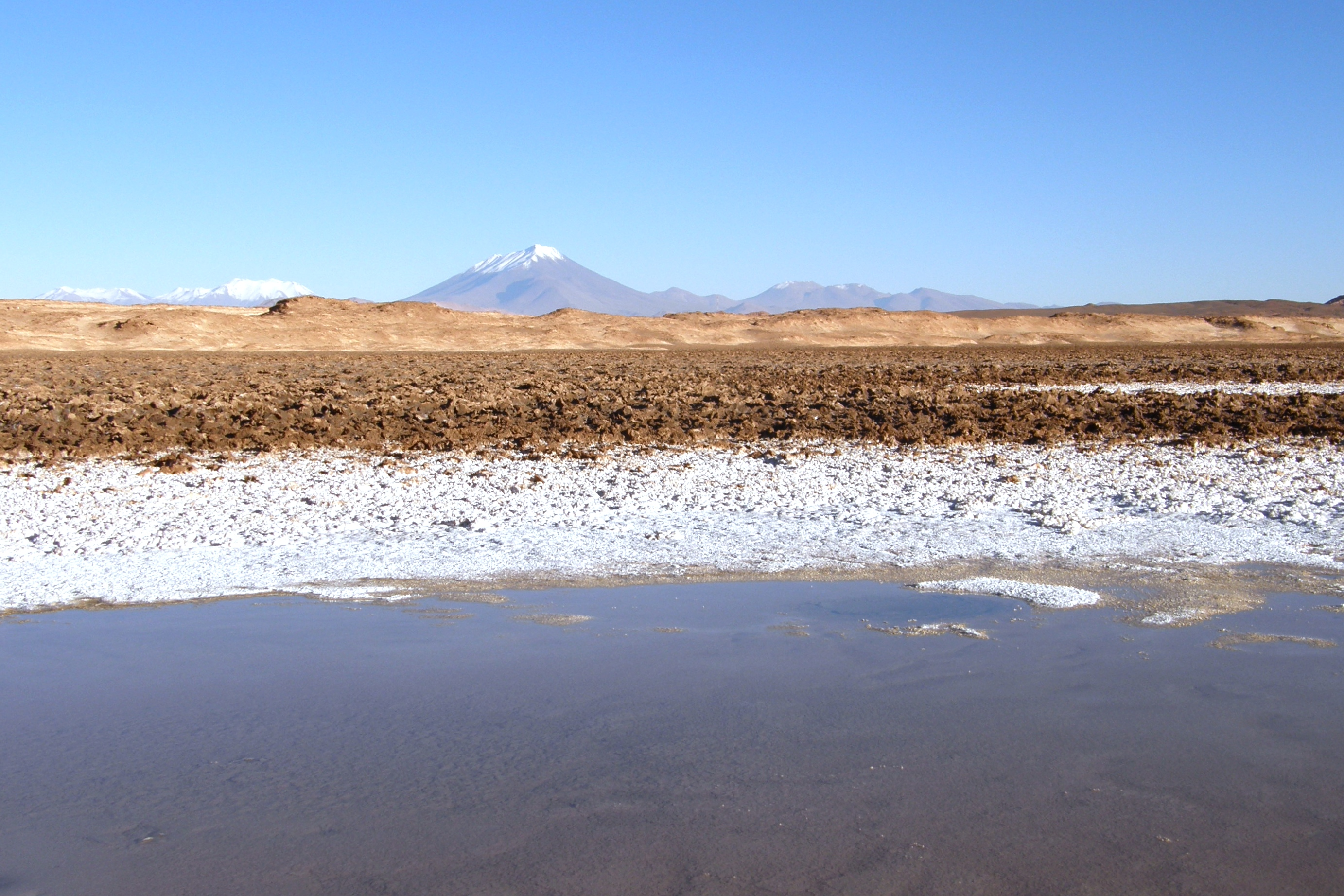
Salar de Tolar Grande, with snow covered Aracar in the background
