= Exiguobacterium indicum =

Scientific classification
- Domain: Bacteria
- Kingdom: Bacillati
- Phylum: Bacillota
- Class: Bacilli
- Order: Bacillales
- Family: Bacillaceae
- Genus: Exiguobacterium
- Species: E. indicum

Binomial name
- Exiguobacterium indicum Chaturvedi and Shivaji 2006

Type strain
- HHS 31

Species of bacteria

Exiguobacterium indicum is a Gram-positive, psychrophilic, non-spore-forming, alkaliphilic, rod-shaped and motile bacterium from the genus of Exiguobacterium which has been isolade from the Hamta glacier.
