= Los Andes Department =

Los Andes
- Department
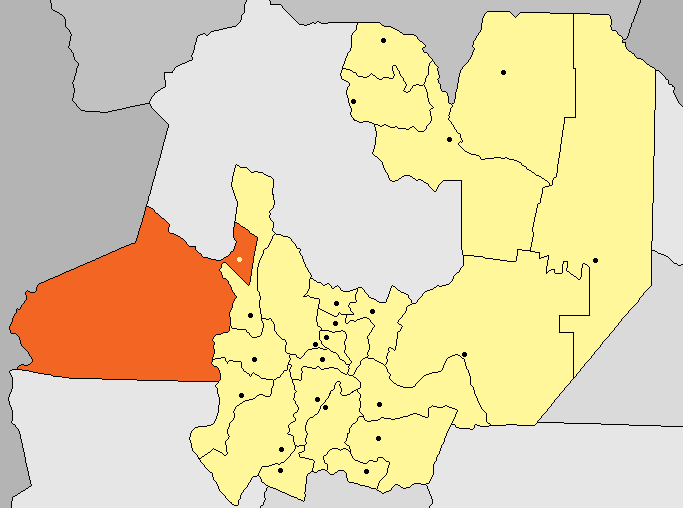
- Coordinates: 24°12′59″S 66°19′19″W
- Country: Argentina
- Province: Salta
- Capital: San Antonio de los Cobres

Area
  - Total: 25,636 km^{2} (9,898 sq mi)

Population (2001)
  - Total: 5,630
  - Density: 0.220/km^{2} (0.569/sq mi)

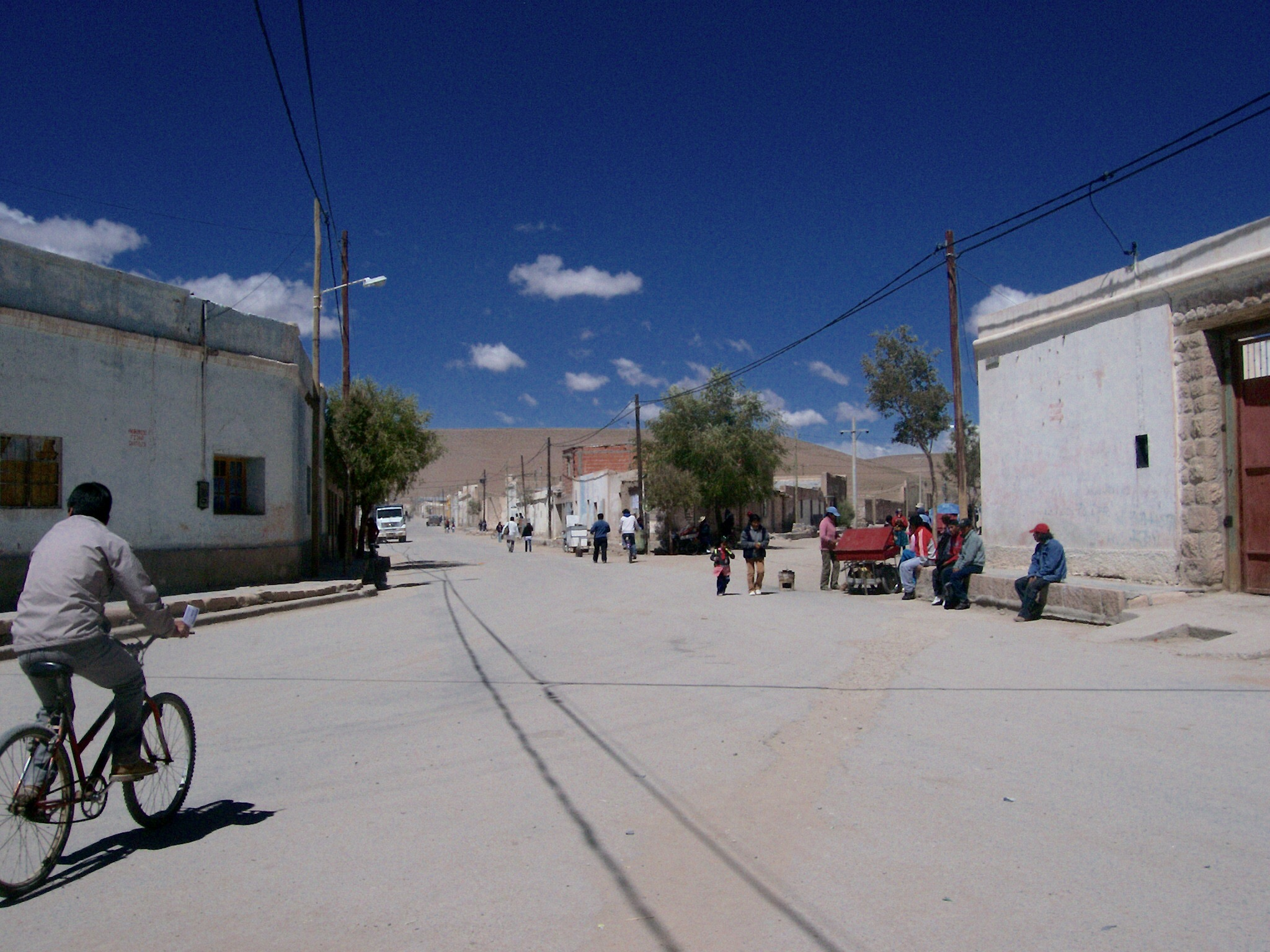
A road in San Antonio de los Cobres

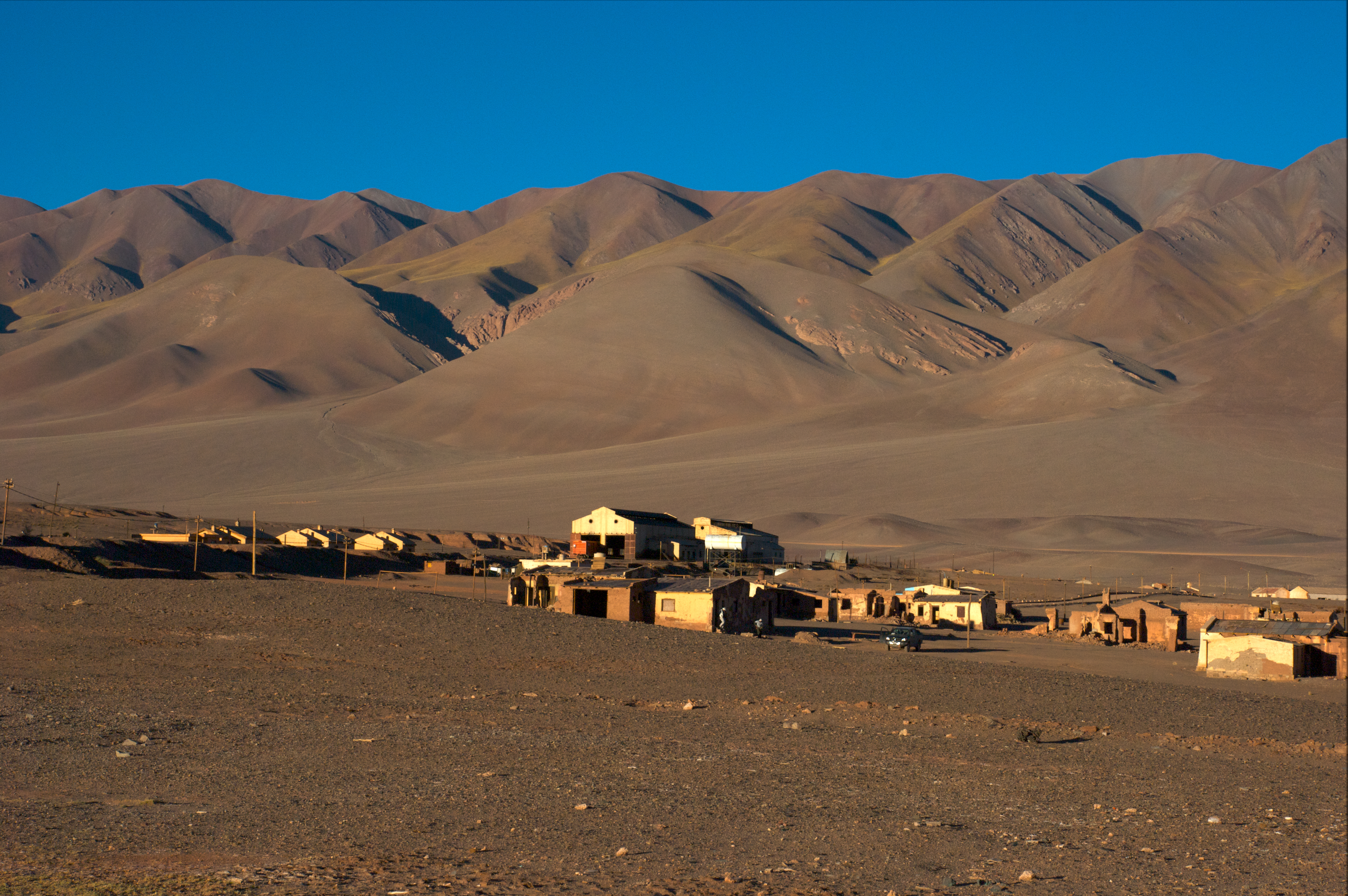
View of Tolar Grande

Los Andes (i.e.: The Andes) is a department located in Salta Province, Argentina. It is the second largest by area in the province, after Rivadavia Department, and its capital is the town of San Antonio de los Cobres.

== Geography ==
=== Overview ===
The department is located in the western area of the province, on the eastern side of the Andes, and includes the Puna de Atacama. It borders with Antofagasta Region (Chile), the provinces of Jujuy and Catamarca, and the departments of La Poma, Cachi and Chicoana. The territorial strip linking the northern and southern side of La Poma Department separates Los Andes from Rosario de Lerma Department.

=== Places ===
Towns and municipalities:

- San Antonio de los Cobres (5,482 inh.)
- Mina La Casualidad (abandoned)
- Olacapato (186 inh.)
- Santa Rosa de los Pastos Grandes (136 inh.)
- Tolar Grande (119 inh.)

Other localities and places:

- Caipe
- Chuculaqui
- Laguna Seca
- Los Patos
- Mina Concordia
- Mina Tincalado
- Quebrada del Agua
- Salar de Pocitos
- Socompa
- Taca Taca
- Unquillal
- Vega de Arizaro

== See also ==
- Tren a las Nubes
- La Polvorilla
- Salar de Arizaro
- Salta–Antofagasta railway
