= Exiguobacterium =

Scientific classification
- Domain: Bacteria
- Kingdom: Bacillati
- Phylum: Bacillota
- Class: Bacilli
- Order: Exiguobacteriales
- Family: Exiguobacteriaceae
- Genus: Exiguobacterium; Collins et al. 1983

Type species
- Exiguobacterium aurantiacum Collins et al. 1984

Species
- See text

Genus of bacteria

Exiguobacterium is a genus of bacilli and a member of the low GC phyla of Bacillota. Collins et al. first described the genus Exiguobacterium with the characterization of E. aurantiacum strain DSM6208T from an alkaline potato processing plant. It has been found in areas covering a wide range of temperatures (-12 °C—55 °C) including glaciers in Greenland and hot springs in Yellowstone, and has been isolated from ancient permafrost in Siberia. This ability to survive in varying temperature extremes makes them an important area of study. Some strains in addition to dynamic thermal adaption are also halotolerant (up to 13% added NaCl added to the medium), can grow within a wide range of pH values (5-11), tolerate high levels of UV radiation, and heavy metal stress (including arsenic).

Exiguobacterium are globally diverse organisms that are found in a variety of environments including microbialites (Thrombolite from Pavilion Lake, BC and Stromatolites from Laguna Socompa, Argentina), ocean, freshwater lakes, Himalayan ice, Himalayan soil, hydrothermal vents, brine shrimp, gastrointestinal tract of marine fish and in microbial biofilms

Seven genomes from the genus have been completed as either complete (one circular chromosome, with plasmids) or in a draft format (containing multiple unassembled contigs). A new species of Exiguobacterium chiriqhucha has been found to have global distribution in cold lakes from Greenland, Pavilion Lake BC, and Laguna Negra, Argentina. The 'Chiri qhucha' in Quechua means 'cold lake.' The study of Gutiérrez-Preciado et al. was confirmed by the completion of genomes two strains of Exiguobacterium chiriqhucha RW2 and GIC31. Phospholipid fatty acid analysis (PLFA) of varying temperatures in Exiguobacterium chiriqhucha strain RW2 results in major rearrangements of cellular membrane function which may allow for its temperature, pH and salinity adaptation.

== Biodegradation of plastic ==
According to an article in the Stanford News Service, senior research engineer Wei-Min Wu reported in his article "Biodegradation and Mineralization of Polystyrene by Plastic-Eating Mealworms. 2. Role of Gut Microorganisms." that mealworms can survive on a diet of polystyrene when aided by strain YT2 of Exiguobacterium living in their gut.

== Phylogeny ==
The currently accepted taxonomy is based on the List of Prokaryotic names with Standing in Nomenclature (LPSN) and National Center for Biotechnology Information (NCBI).

16S rRNA based LTP_10_2024

- Exiguobacterium
  - - E. marinum Kim et al. 2005
    - - - E. profundum Crapart et al. 2007
        - - E. aestuarii Kim et al. 2005
          - E. qingdaonense Liu et al. 2022
      - - E. algae Liu et al. 2022
        - - "E. aquaticum" Raichand et al. 2012
          - - E. mexicanum López-Cortés et al. 2006
            - - E. alkaliphilum Kulshreshtha et al. 2013
              - E. aurantiacum Collins et al. 1984
  - - E. flavidum Meng et al. 2020
    - - - E. undae Frühling et al. 2002
        - - E. artemiae López-Cortés et al. 2006
          - E. sibiricum Rodrigues et al. 2006
      - - E. oxidotolerans Yumoto et al. 2004
        - - - E. antarcticum Frühling et al. 2002
            - E. soli Chaturvedi et al. 2008
          - - E. acetylicum (Levine & Soppeland 1926) Farrow, Wallbanks & Collins 1994
            - - E. enclense Dastager et al. 2015
              - E. indicum Chaturvedi & Shivaji 2006

120 marker proteins based GTDB 09-RS220

- Exiguobacterium
  - - E. flavidum
    - - - E. acetylicum
        - E. indicum (incl. Exiguobacterium enclense)
      - - E. oxidotolerans
        - - E. undae
          - - E. antarcticum
            - - E. artemiae
              - E. sibiricum
  - - - E. algae
      - - E. qingdaonense
        - - E. marinum
          - - E. aestuarii
            - E. profundum
    - - - "E. chiriqhucha" Gutierrez-Preciado et al. 2017
        - E. mexicanum
      - - E. aurantiacum
        - - E. alkaliphilum
          - "E. himgiriensis" Singh et al. 2013

Unassigned species:

- "E. arabatum" Jakubauskas et al. 2009
- "E. homiense" Kwon 2006a
- "E. panipatensis" Lal & Gupta 2007
- "E. taiwanense" Chen et al. 2006
