= Exiguobacterium chiriqhucha =

Scientific classification
- Domain: Bacteria
- Kingdom: Bacillati
- Phylum: Bacillota
- Class: Bacilli
- Order: Bacillales
- Family: Bacillaceae
- Genus: Exiguobacterium
- Species: E. chiriqhucha

Binomial name
- Exiguobacterium chiriqhucha Gutierrez-Preciado et al. 2017

Synonyms
- Exiguobacterium pavilionensis

Species of bacteria

Exiguobacterium chiriqhucha is a bacterium from the genus of Exiguobacterium.
