= Tolar Grande =

Coordinates: 24°36′S 67°27′W

- Municipality and village
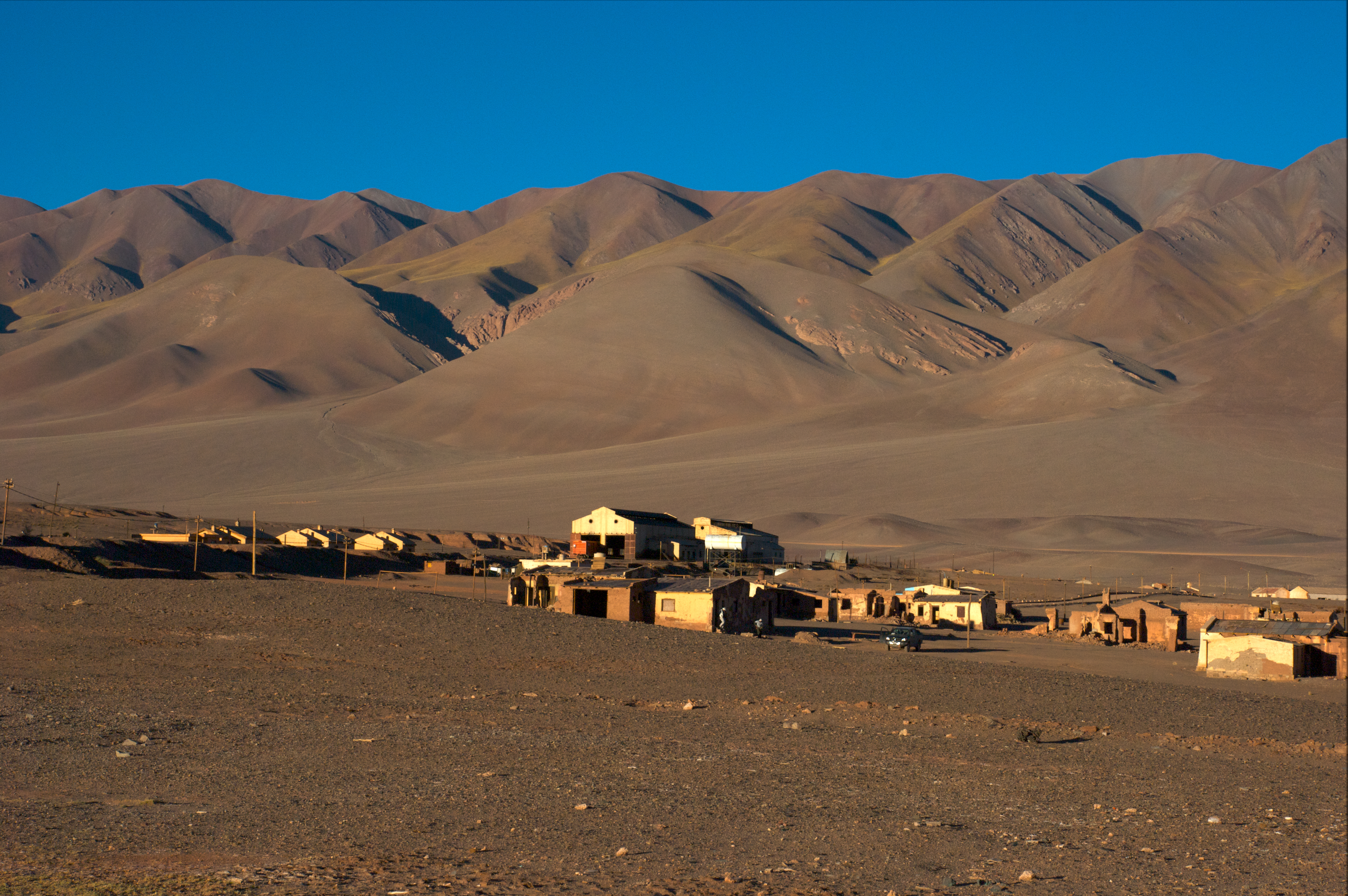

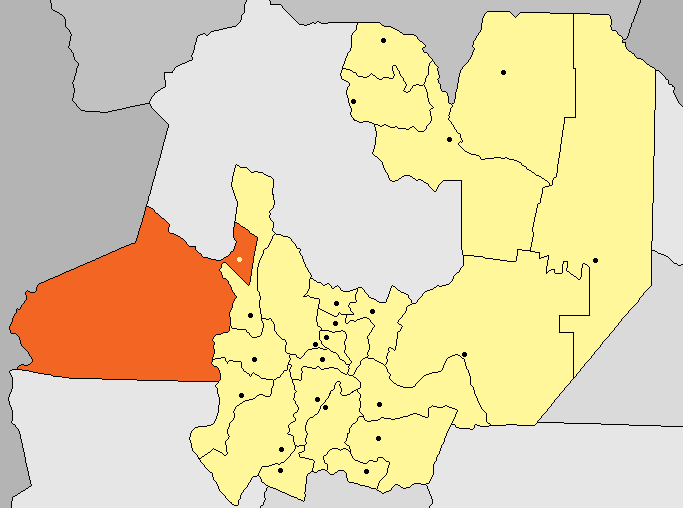
- Country: Argentina
- Province: Salta
- Department: Los Andes

Government
  - Presidente comunal: Sergio Alejandro Villanueva

Area
  - Total: 5,322 sq mi (13,785 km^{2})
- Elevation: 11,509 ft (3,508 m)

Population (2009)
  - Total: 148
- Time zone: UTC−3 (ART)
- Postal code: A4413
- Website: www.tolargrande.gov.ar/

Tolar Grande is a village and rural municipality in Salta Province in northwestern Argentina.

== Climate ==
The climate is typical of the puna area and more precisely of the very dry Puna de Atacama, with very little rainfall, moderate-temperature summers and harsh winters. A significant characteristic is the great diurnal air temperature variation, which can reach a difference of 30 °C between the minimum and maximum temperature of the same day.

== Population ==
According to estimates, by 2015 the population amounted to 210 people. This notable increase was due to policies promoted by local authorities with the aim of reversing the emigration process and the consequent depopulation.

== History ==
Tolar Grande had its period of maximum expansion towards the 1940s. At that time, the town constituted the end of the railroad branch to Chile, projected to unite the city of Salta with the city of Antofagasta. It is estimated that at that time, around 5000 people lived in the town, mainly dedicated to railway activity.

At the same time, during this period the La Casualidad Mine was in full activity, transporting the sulfur cargoes from Mina Julia to the Tolar Grande railway station, to be shipped from there to their final destination.

The closure of the mine, the interruption of the railway project, and then the total closure of the branch led to the depopulation of the region, with the consequent deterioration of the living conditions of the few residents who decided not to leave the town.

== Overview ==
The village is located in the middle of the Puna de Atacama, 357 km far from the city of Salta and near the Salar de Arizaro. It is served by the Salta–Antofagasta railway and is 170 km from Chile and borders at Socompa. The tourist attraction Ojos de Mar lies nearby. With a municipal area of 13,785 km^{2}, it covers at almost half of the Los Andes Department territory.

== Gallery ==
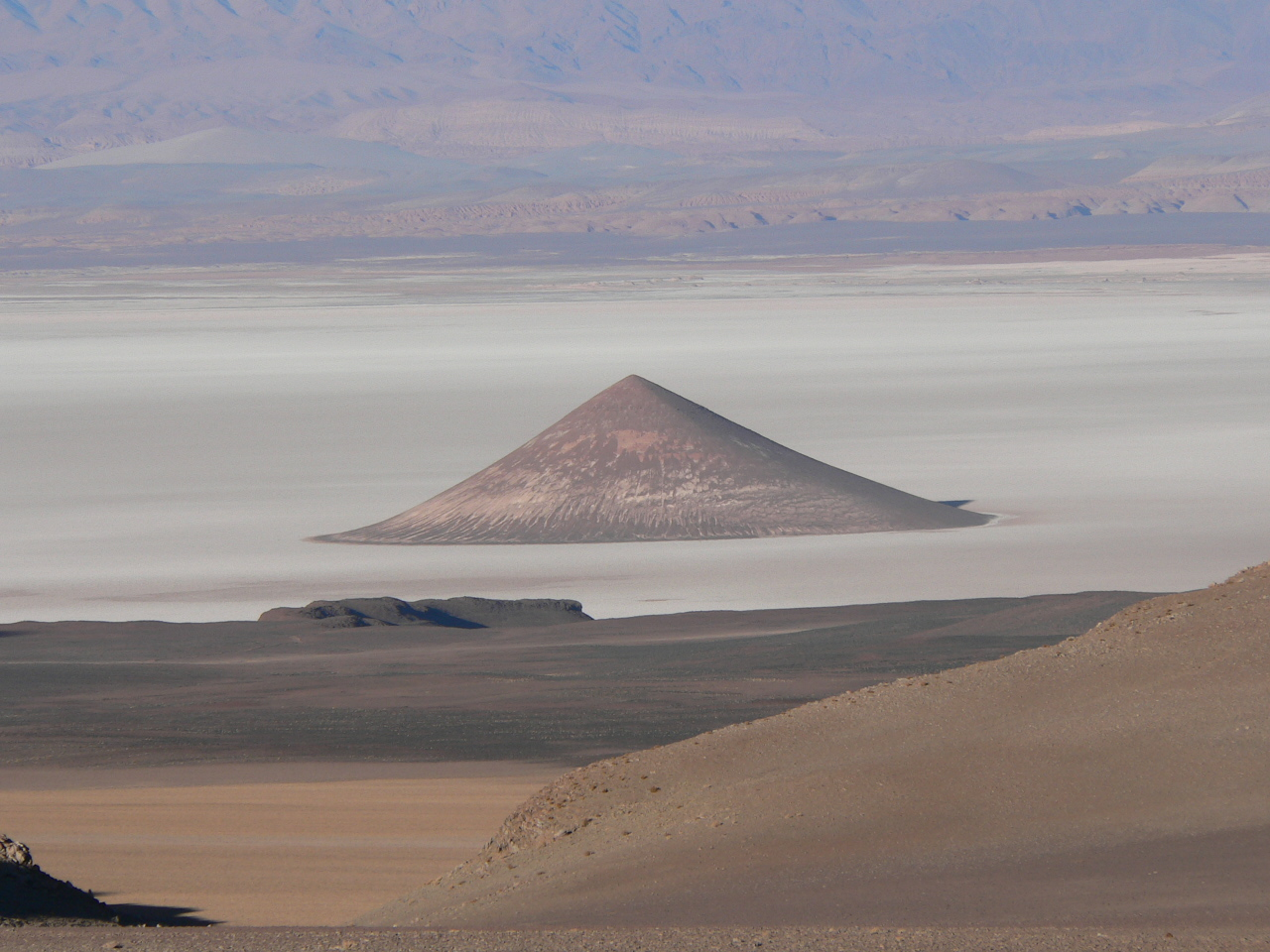
Cono de Arita in Salar de Arizaro

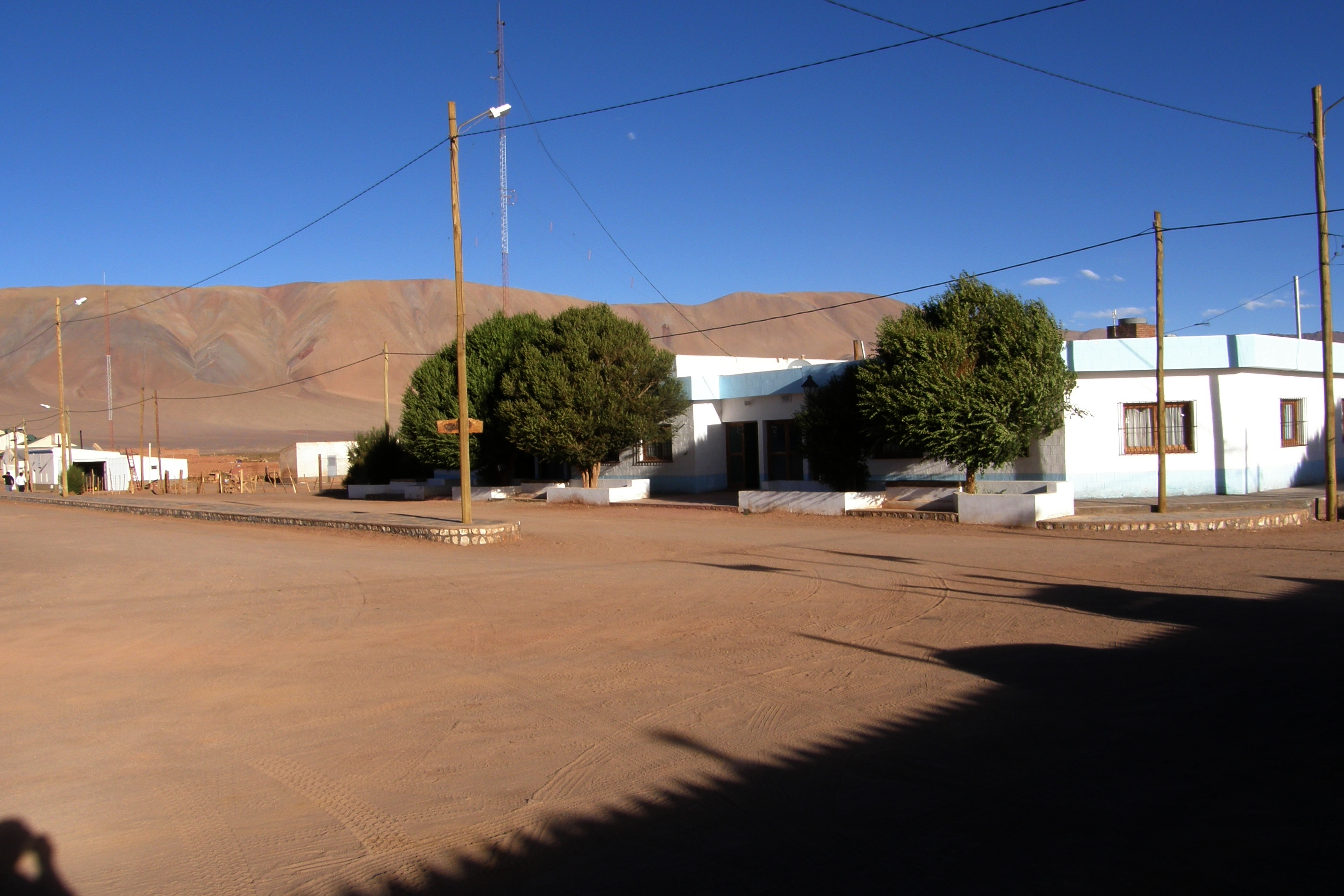
Town's view
