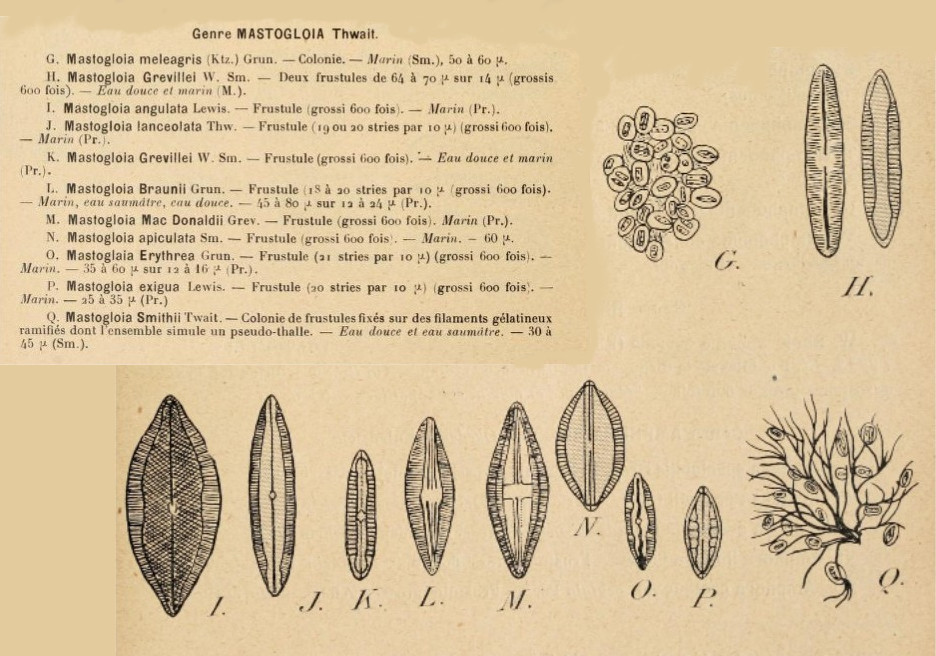
- Anatomic drawings by Henry Coupin, circa 1868.

Scientific classification
- Domain: Eukaryota
- Clade: Diaphoretickes
- Clade: SAR
- Clade: Stramenopiles
- Phylum: Gyrista
- Subphylum: Ochrophytina
- Class: Bacillariophyceae
- Order: Mastogloiales
- Family: Mastogloiaceae

= Mastogloiaceae =

Family of algae

Mastogloiaceae is a family of diatoms belonging to the order Mastogloiales.

Genera:

- Aneumastus
- Craspedostauros
- Decussata
