= Salar de Arizaro =

Salt flat in north-western Argentina

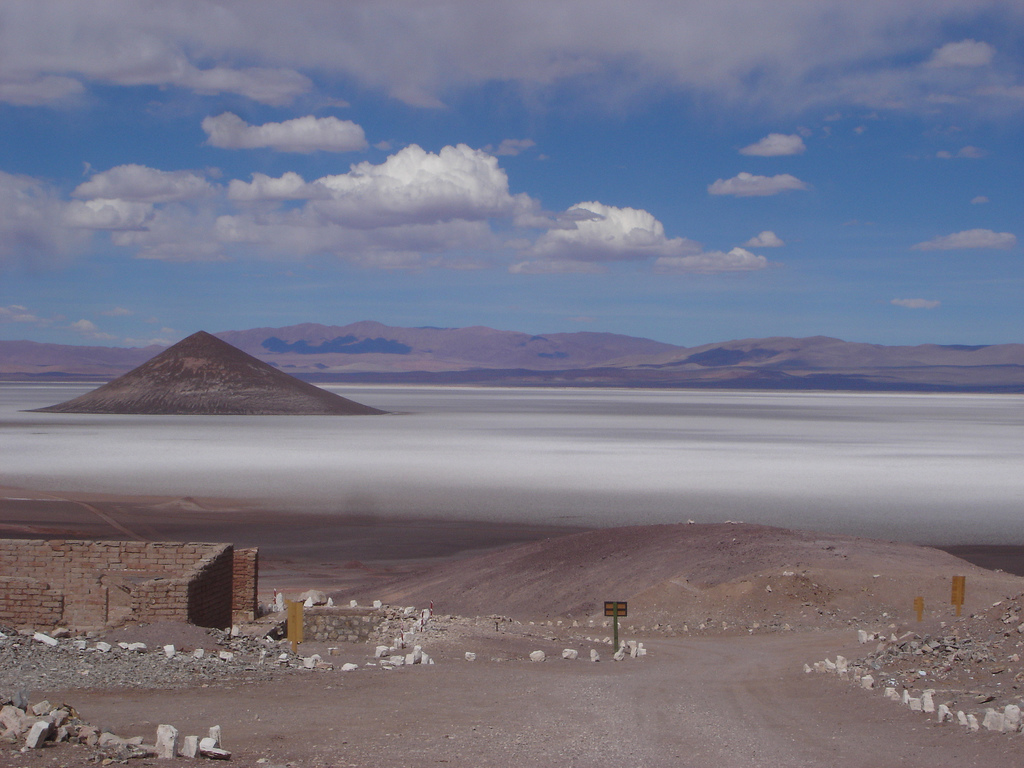
- A view of the Salar de Arizaro

- Location within Argentina

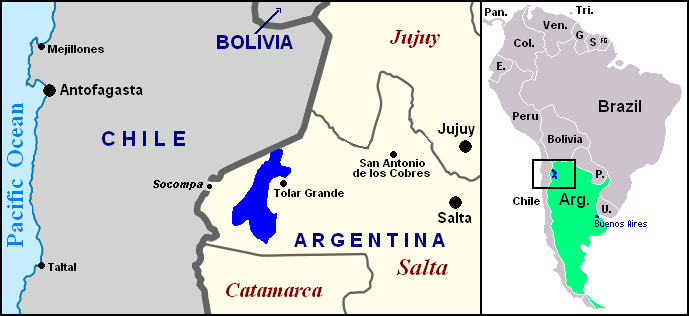
- Location of Salar de Arizaro (blue) within northwestern Argentina and South America
- Location: Argentina
- Coordinates: 24°43′22.8″S 67°44′16.8″W
- Basin countries: Argentina
- Max. length: 100 km (62 mi)
- Max. width: 50 km (31 mi)
- Surface area: 1,600 km^{2} (618 sq mi)
- Surface elevation: 3,460 m (11,352 ft)
- Islands: Cono de Arita
- Settlements: Tolar Grande

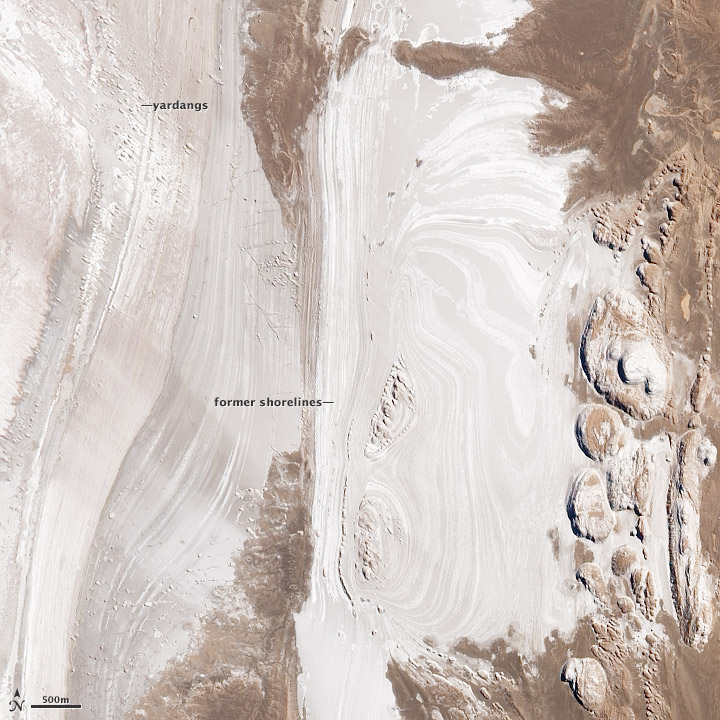
The dry lakebeds and yardangs in Salar de Arizaro, imaged by NASA's Earth Observing-1 satellite. In the upper left corner, small rounded bumps in the landscape are yardangs, dusty hills formed when soft rocks are weathered and abraded by winds. The yardangs are aligned precisely with the northwesterly winds. On the right, bulbous hills have sharps edges, a formation typical of salt weathering around the base. During salt weathering, rocks are eroded by repeated salt crystal growth. The eroded material has been blown away by the strong winds of the high desert, leaving the sharp edge.

Salar de Arizaro ("Arizaro" comes from Atacameno haâri "crow" in the sense of "condor" and ara, aro, "accommodation", "place where something is common".) is a large salt flat of the Andes in north-western Argentina. It is located between the villages of Tolar Grande and Caipe, near Mina La Casualidad, in Los Andes Department, Salta Province.

== Overview ==
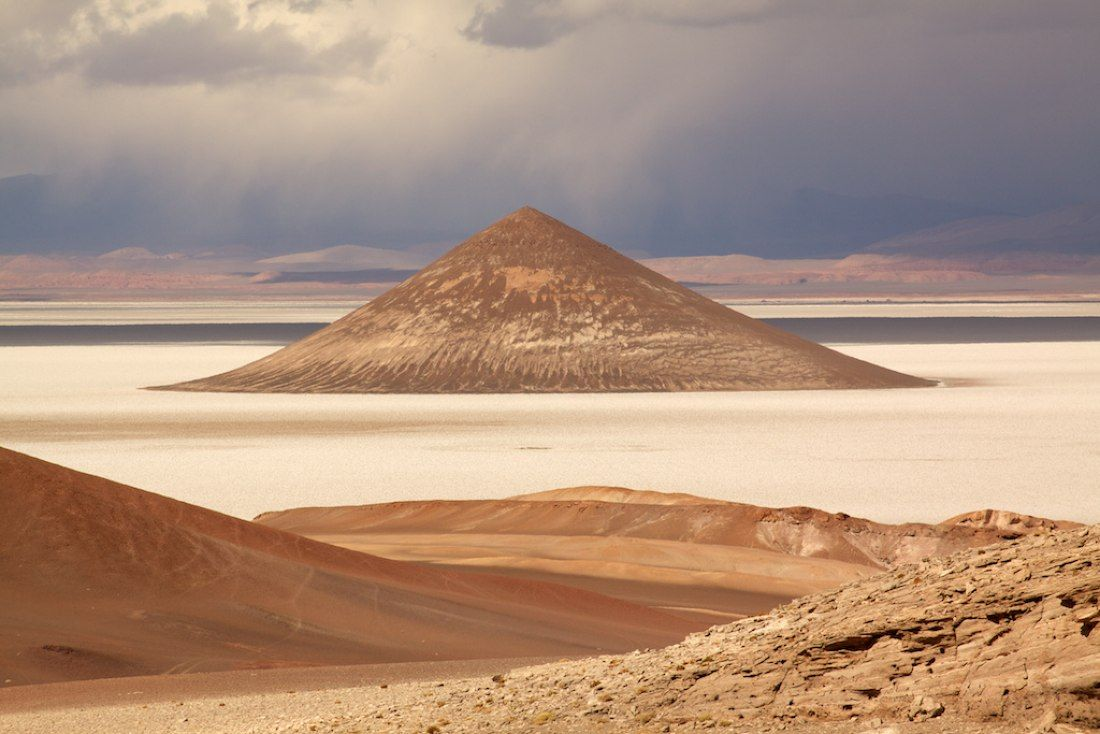
Cono de Arita in Salar de Arizaro

Located in the central-western area of the Puna de Atacama, it covers an area of 1,600 km^{2} (618 sq mi). Per extension, Salar de Arizaro is the 6th largest salt flat in the World and the 2nd largest in Argentina after the Salinas Grandes.

The salar area features metallic and non-metallic resources, including salt, marble, iron, copper and onyx.

The nearest salt flats include Antofalla, Hombre Muerto (both in the north of Catamarca Province), Pocitos (in the east) and the Salinas Grandes of Jujuy and Salta provinces.

The Salar de Arizaro is crossed in the middle by the Salta–Antofagasta railway and the Provincial Route 27 (part of the former RN 59). A particular characteristic of it is a conical hill named Cerro Cono (or Cono de Arita), a sandstone-formation.

The Salar de Arizaro is situated in the Lithium Triangle, and the area is being assessed for the extraction of Lithium carbonate by at least two companies: Lithium Chile and LiTHIUM-X

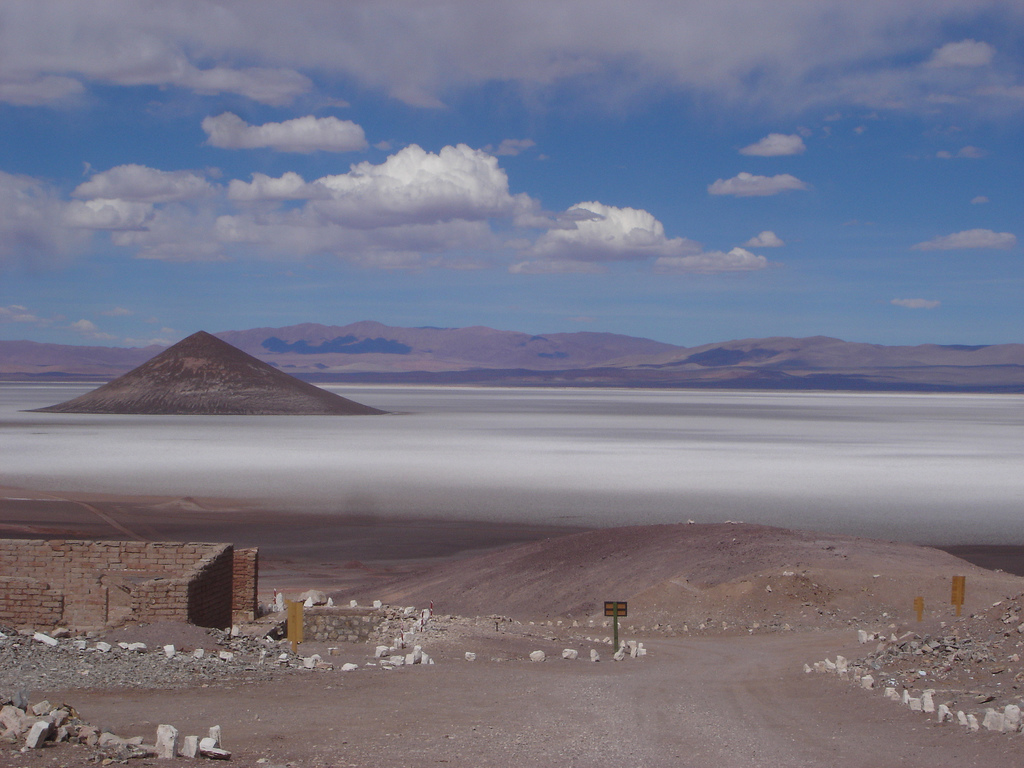
Cono de Arita

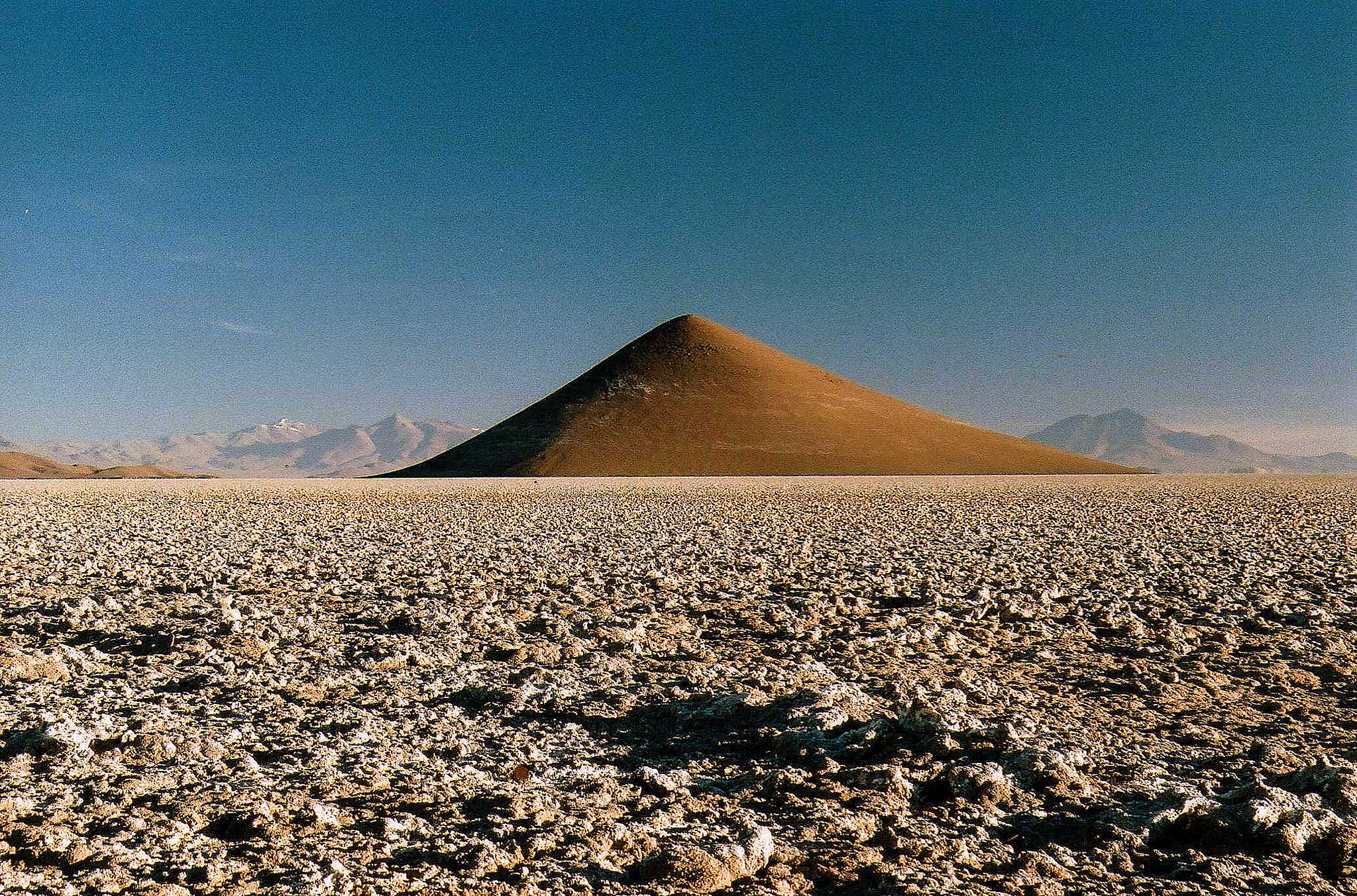
Cono de Arita

== See also ==
- Atacama Desert
- Salar de Uyuni
- Salar de Atacama

== Literature ==
- Gonzalo Monterroso: Touring Argentina - Salta. 1999, ISBN 9879821645
- R. N. Alonso, J. G. Viramonte: Geología y Metalogenia de la Puna. Estudios geol. 43:393-407 (1987)
