= Laguna Socompa =

Lake in Argentina

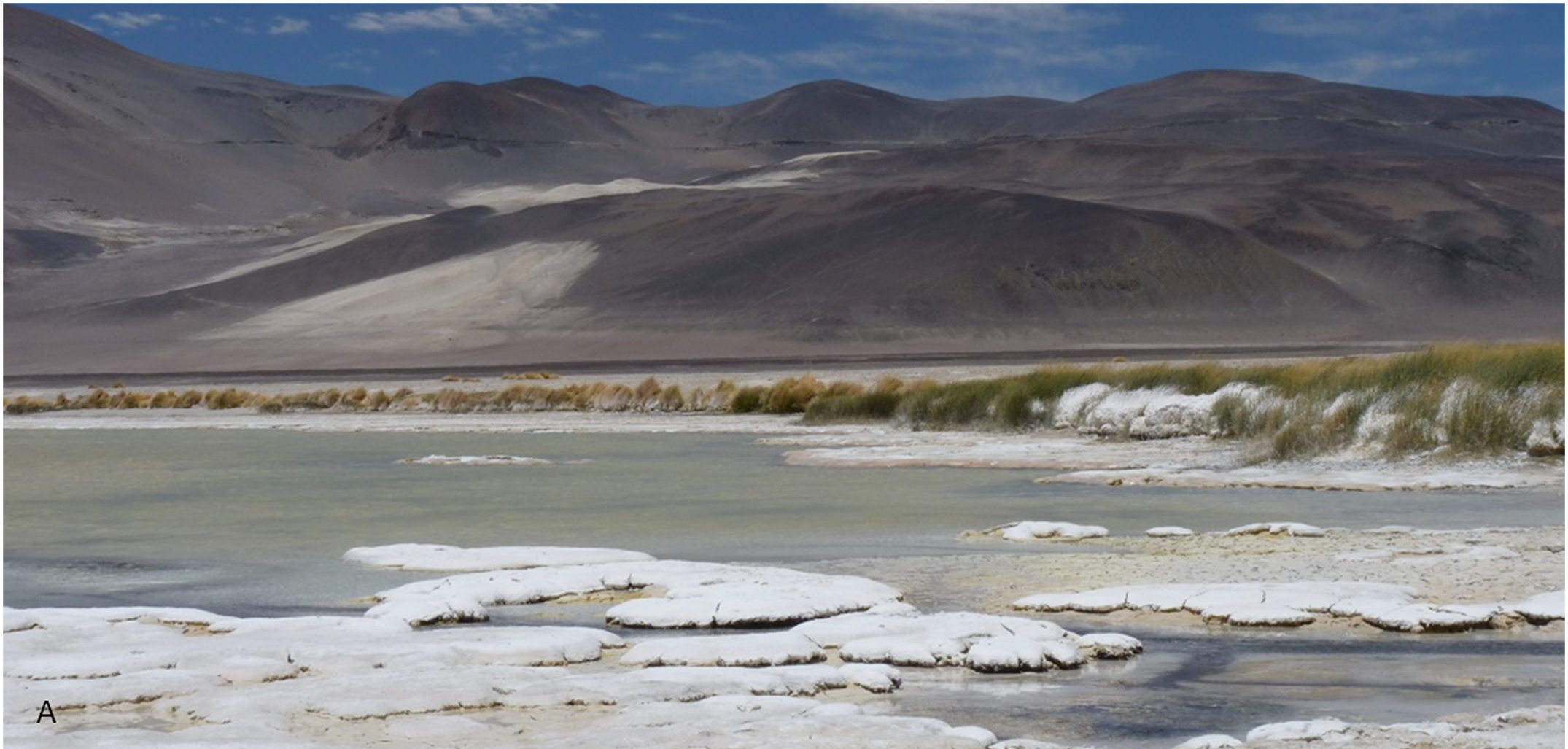

- Location within Argentina
- Coordinates: 24°31′27″S 68°12′26″W
- Surface area: 2 square kilometres (0.77 sq mi)
- Average depth: 0.45–0.62 metres (1 ft 6 in – 2 ft 0 in)
- Shore length^{1}: 5 kilometres (3.1 mi)
- Surface elevation: 3,570 metres (11,710 ft)
- ^{1} Shore length is not a well-defined measure.

Laguna Socompa is a small lake in the Salta Province of Argentina, at the foot of Socompa volcano. It covers an area of about 200 hectares (490 acres) and has an average depth of about 0.45–0.62 metres (1 ft 6 in – 2 ft 0 in). The lake is fed by arroyos and springs, some of which are hot springs. Its waters are very rich in arsenic and otherwise salty and slightly alkaline; these properties and the regionally high UV radiation give Laguna Socompa extreme environmental conditions.

The lake features the world's highest known stromatoliths, mineralized structures formed by microorganisms. Stromatolith-forming microbes were the dominant lifeforms on Earth fossilized between 3.5 and 1.5 billion years ago and may give insight on early life on Earth. These stromatoliths are found on the southern shore of the lake and led to Laguna Socompa being declared a protected area.

== Geography and geomorphology ==
Laguna Socompa is located at an elevation of 3,570 metres (11,710 ft) in the Los Andes Department of the Salta Province in Argentina, close to the border with Chile. A railway to the border with Chile passes east of Laguna Socompa; the Socompa railway station lies c. 10 kilometres (6.2 mi) north-northwest of the lake and the Quebrada del Agua station northeast of the lake is even closer. The area is far away from any city or town and road access is only "incipient" but sodium sulfate was produced in the area of Laguna Socompa. The lake was defined a protected area in 2011 but is also in the area of the Socompa geothermal power prospect.

The lake covers a surface of about 200 hectares (490 acres) and has the form of an "L" upside down and backwards. Its depth fluctuates between 0.45–0.62 metres (1 ft 6 in – 2 ft 0 in) with lower water levels during December to May. Twelve terraces surrounding the lake testify to higher water levels in the past. The northwestern and eastern shores feature well developed wetland vegetation and are about 5 kilometres (3.1 mi) long, while dry beaches are found elsewhere along the shore. Sandy-stony ground with bush vegetation characterizes the surrounding landscape which is in general mountainous. Reportedly, the area of the lake smells of sulfur.

Some arroyos enter into Laguna Socompa, and on the eastern side water flows from the Quebrada del Agua spring towards the lake; part of its water is piped to an old mill at the railway. Additional springs occur around and within the lake. On the western-southwestern margins of the lake, hot springs with temperatures of up to 26 °C (79 °F)–27.5 °C (81.5 °F) are found; volcanic activity represented by the Socompa volcano is responsible for heating the waters of the hot springs. The activity of the hot springs has resulted in the deposition of diatomite and sodium sulfate along the shores. The existence of a hydrothermal system in the area has been inferred.

The waters of the lake are somewhat alkaline, turbid, brackish to hypersaline and have a high arsenic content. Salinity increases towards the east. The lakefloor is covered by material with a composition resembling brine, clay and silt. Oncolites have also been reported from Laguna Socompa and there are diatomite deposits left by the lake.

The lake is situated at the foot of the active volcano Socompa within a depression at its foot; the depression was formerly a north-northwest trending valley before the volcano grew in the valley. The volcano features steaming ground and fumaroles at its summit. Lava domes lie along the margins of the Laguna Socompa depression, which may be a cryptic caldera. The region is dominated by long mountain ranges and high volcanoes such as the 5,317 metres (17,444 ft) high Cerro Mellado south of Laguna Socompa. The name of a neighbouring mountain may be a reference to the lake.

== Climate and environment ==
The lake is part of the windy, cold, dry Puna where temperatures vary strongly between day and night, precipitation only occurs in summer. In summer temperatures range from 20 to −10 °C (68 to 14 °F) and in winter from 10 to −40 °C (50 to −40 °F). The region has the highest solar flux in the world, including the largest amount of ultraviolet radiation.

The small lakes in the Puna desert are influenced by extreme environmental conditions such as large amounts of toxic elements such as arsenic, high salinity and strong ultraviolet radiation as the ozone column is less dense at high elevations; these lakes in general receive more insolation than any other place on Earth. Because of the dry climate, most of the lakes lose water mainly through evaporation and thus tend to accumulate salt and arsenic.

== Biology ==
Small lakes in the Puna are places where birds concentrate in comparison to the surrounding environments. About 27 bird species have been observed at Laguna Socompa, including both waterbirds and terrestrial birds; the most common are Anas flavirostris (yellow-billed teal), Hirundo rustica (barn swallow), Larus seranus, Lessonia rufa (austral negrito) and Lophonetta specularioides (crested duck). Among mammals, vicuñas have been reported. Crustaceans and insects have not been reported from the lake.

The vegetation in the wetlands around the lake is characterized by Cyperaceae and Graminaceae. Underwater vegetation does not occur in Laguna Socompa owing to the brackish water. There is little phytoplankton in the lake waters, mainly cyanobacteria and diatoms.

=== Microorganisms ===
Microorganisms that live in the lakes and wetlands of the dry Andes have to resist harmful environmental traits and thus become extremely hardy with e.g. high UV radiation tolerance. They often also produce secondary metabolites that are of interest to the industry, such as medicine, UV blocking and bioremediation, which has spurred research in these extreme environments. Furthermore, they are considered to be potential analogs to extraterrestrial life due to the environmental conditions.

Several microorganisms in the lake have been isolated and studied, with their genomes sequenced. Among these is Exiguobacterium sp. strain 17 which was first isolated in Laguna Socompa; it possesses a number of genes involved in metabolizing arsenic and other toxic compounds and protecting and repairing the genome. Other strains from Laguna Socompa whose genomes have been sequenced are Salinivibrio sp. strain 34 and 35.

=== Stromatoliths ===
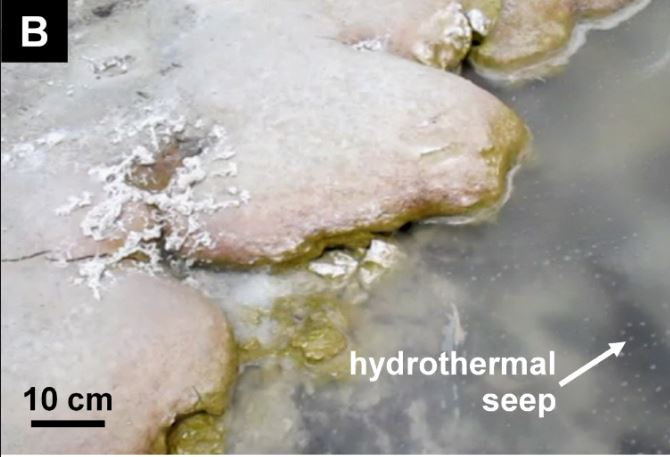
Photo of stromatoliths in Laguna Socompa

In 2009, researchers discovered the presence of stromatoliths at Laguna Socompa; stromatoliths are layered structures formed by microorganisms when their metabolism causes the accumulation of minerals. At Laguna Socompa, the stromatoliths occur on the eastern shore and they are submerged during winter. These are the first stromatoliths found in Argentina and the highest site where stromatoliths have been recorded to date; their existence was the reason why the lake was made a protected area. Their discovery has stimulated research in their occurrence at other waterbodies in the Altiplano-Puna and there is increasing tourism in the area of Laguna Socompa.

The discovery of stromatoliths at Laguna Socompa and the extreme conditions that exist there offers insights into the development of early life on Earth as microbe-formed structures like stromatoliths were the main traces of life from between 3.5 and 1.5 billion years ago before stromatoliths declined between 1 and 0.7 billion years ago due to the development of burrowing and grazing lifeforms. Previously stromatoliths were known mainly from marine and carbonatic environments such as in the Bahamas, the Coorong Lagoon and Shark Bay in Australia, the Lagoa Salgada in Brazil and the Laguna Bacalar in Mexico. The Laguna Socompa stromatoliths are the first to be discovered at elevations exceeding 3,500 metres (11,500 ft); the presence of active hot springs may be responsible for their formation.

These stromatoliths have a layered structure and cone-like shapes that sometimes overlap and then form large domes, unlike the bushy or crustose stromatoliths found elsewhere, and are found underwater on the southern shores of the lake, protected from the strong UV radiation. They have a layered structure, with the layers having distinct appearances on the surface and inside of the stromatolite. The UV protective carotenoid pigment deinoxanthin gives them a pink colour. Unusually, some stromatoliths are formed out of halite rather than the more common aragonite/carbonate although aragonite and silica are their most important building materials.

The dominant bacteria in the stromatoliths are Microcoleus cyanobacteria and deinococci in the surface; there are also eukaryotic algae, diatoms of the genera Navicula and Nitzschia. Other taxa include Desulfobacterales, Rhodobacteraceae, and Spirochaetota and mostly represent novel lineages; the extreme conditions of these high elevation lakes lead to high extremophile diversity. Some of the Laguna Socompa stromatoliths are classified as Conophyton stromatoliths, which are otherwise only known as Precambrian (over 538.8 ± 0.6 million years old) fossils. Worms (nematodes, related to the genus Diplolaimella) live in the stromatoliths.
