= Mastogloiales =

Scientific classification
- Domain: Eukaryota
- Clade: Diaphoretickes
- Clade: SAR
- Clade: Stramenopiles
- Phylum: Gyrista
- Subphylum: Ochrophytina
- Class: Bacillariophyceae
- Subclass: Bacillariophycidae
- Superorder: Bacillariophycanae
- Order: Mastogloiales

Order of algae

Mastogloiales is an order of algae belonging to the class Bacillariophyceae.

Families:

- Mastogloiaceae
