= Geste Formation =

Geologic formation in Argentina

- Stratigraphic range: Priabonian (Divisaderan); ~42–36 Ma
- Type: Geological formation
- Unit of: Pastos Grandes Group
- Sub-units: Upper, Middle, Lower Members
- Underlies: Pozuelos Formation
- Overlies: Various Paleozoic basement formations
- Thickness: up to 1,500 m (4,900 ft)

Lithology
- Primary: Sandstone, conglomerate
- Other: Shale

Location
- Coordinates: 26.1°S 67.4°W
- Approximate paleocoordinates: 28.1°S 59.4°W
- Region: Catamarca & Salta Provinces
- Country: Argentina
- Extent: Puna Plateau

Type section
- Named by: Turner
- Year defined: 1960
- Geste Formation (Argentina)

The Geste Formation (Spanish: Formación Geste) is a fossiliferous geologic formation of the Puna Plateau in the western Salta Province and northern Catamarca Province of the Argentine Northwest, northwestern Argentina.

The formation, reaching a thickness of 1,500 metres (4,900 ft), is the oldest unit of the Pastos Grandes Group, underlying the Pozuelos Formation and unconformably overlying various Paleozoic formations. The Geste Formation comprises red sandstones and conglomerates deposited in a fluvial to alluvial environment. The formation was initially dated to the Mustersan (Middle Eocene), but subsequent research proved the formation to date to the Late Eocene (Divisaderan in the SALMA classification, ranging approximately from 42 to 36 Ma.

The Geste Formation has provided a faunal assemblage of vertebrates unique for the Argentine Northwest, with several groups of mammals, most notably the only Paleogene interatheres of northwestern Argentina, reptiles and frogs. Only partly they correspond to other fossiliferous formations in the area; the upper part of the Lumbrera Formation and the Quebrada de los Colorados Formation.

== Description ==
The Geste Formation crops out in isolated patches on the Puna Plateau, stretching from the Salar de Arizaro in the north to the Colorado Ridge, southeast of the Salar de Antofalla in the south. covering the western part of Salta Province and the northern part of Catamarca Province. The most extensive outcrops of the formation occur between three volcanoes in the area; the Tebenquicho in the west, Cerro Ratones in the east and Hombre Muerto to the southeast. The formation was defined based on a type section of the Pastos Grandes Basin by Turner in 1960, 1961 and 1964. The formation comprises mainly coarsening upward sandstones, conglomerates and subordinate shales, deposited in a fluvial and alluvial environment. The Geste Formation is the lowermost unit of the Pastos Grandes Group and unconformably overlies different Paleozoic basements; the Late Ordovician Copalayo or Coquena Formation in the Pastos Grandes Basin, Ordovician Falda Ciénaga Formation in Antofagasta de la Sierra and Cordón del Gallego, Coquena Formation in the Sierra de Calalaste, or the Permian Patquía de la Cuesta Formation in the area surrounding the Antofalla volcano.

The formation, reaching a thickness of 1,500 metres (4,900 ft), is overlain by the evaporites and claystones of the Pozuelos Formation of the Pastos Grandes Group. The small Pastos Grandes Basin was formed during the Incan orogeny in the Eocene. The Geste Formation is the only fossiliferous Paleogene formation cropping out in the Argentine Northwest. In the Pastos Grandes Basin, in outcrops located on the eastern flank of the Sierra de Copalayo in Salta Province, the Geste Formation was divided by Alonso (1992) into three members: lower, middle, and upper. The middle member contains fossils of vertebrates and represents deposition by medium-to-fast-flowing rivers, laying down the fine-to-medium-grained micaceous sandstones, grading into coarser sandstones towards the top of the middle member.

The sediments of the Geste Formation were sourced by the provenance area of the Oira Eruptive Complex, which formed a paleohigh between the Puna Plateau and the Calchaquí Valley where the contemporaneous Quebrada de los Colorados Formation was deposited.

The middle member of the formation has been dated at maximum 37.5 ± 0.1 and minimum 35.4 ± 1.5 Ma, corresponding to the Priabonian stage of the Eocene.

=== Paleoecology ===
The paleoclimate of the time was much more humid than today, with elevated temperatures compared to the present-day climate and the area was at lower altitudes before the final phase of the Andean orogeny which did not take place before the Miocene. In this subtropical fluvial biome, a diverse fauna established, with fossils of various groups found in the formation. Several clades found in the Geste Formation have not been found elsewhere in northwestern Argentina. The fauna of the area is only partly overlapping with the upper Lumbrera Formation and that of the Quebrada de los Colorados Formation.

== Paleontological significance ==
The Geste Formation is an important Paleogene formation, as it is the only formation that has provided interathere fossils. Two fossil localities on the Puna Plateau are known, Antofagasta de la Sierra in Catamarca at an approximate altitude of 3,440 metres (11,290 ft) and Pozuelos in Salta Province at 3,900 metres (12,800 ft). The faunal assemblage comprises mammals of various groups, with notoungulates and armadillos dominating, reptiles (crocodiles, turtles and snakes not assigned to specific genera) and frog fossils.

=== Fossil content ===
The formation has provided the following fossils:

Class	Group	Fossils	Image	Notes
Mammals	Armadillos	Parastegosimpsonia cf. peruana		
Mammals	Armadillos	Parutaetus punaensis		
Mammals	Armadillos	Prostegotherium notostylopianum		
Mammals	Armadillos	Pucatherium parvum		
Mammals	Armadillos	Punatherium catamarcensis		
Mammals	Armadillos	Astegotherium sp.		
Mammals	Armadillos	Prostegotherium sp.		
Mammals	Armadillos	cf. Utaetus sp.		
Mammals	Notoungulates	Antofagastia turneri		
Mammals	Notoungulates	Punahyrax bondesioi		
Mammals	Notoungulates	Punapithecus minor		
Mammals	Notoungulates	cf. Pampahippus sp.		
Mammals	Notoungulates	Notostylopidae indet.		
Mammals	Notoungulates	Notoungulata indet.		
Mammals	Marsupials	Bonapartherium serrensis		
Mammals	Marsupials	Punadolops alonsoi		
Mammals	Marsupials	Reigia punae		
Mammals	Typotheres	Suniodon catamarcensis		
Mammals	Typotheres	?Colbertia sp.		
Mammals	Typotheres	Oldfieldthomasiidae indet.		
Mammals	Polydolopimorphia	Apeirodon solanoi		
Mammals	Didolodontidae	Ernestokokenia cf. yirunhor		
Mammals	Pyrotheres	Propyrotherium sp.		
Mammals	Sparassodonts	Callistoe sp.		
Mammals	Astrapotheres	Astrapotheriidae indet.		
Mammals	Litopterns	Litopterna indet.		
Reptiles	Crocodiles	Sebecidae indet.		
Reptiles	Snakes	Boidae indet.		
Reptiles	Turtles	Testudines indet.		
Amphibians	Frogs	Anura indet.		

== See also ==
- South American land mammal ages
- Guabirotuba Formation, contemporaneous fossiliferous formation of the Curitiba Basin, Brazil
- Seca Formation, contemporaneous fossiliferous formation of Ecuador
- La Meseta Formation, contemporaneous fossiliferous formation of Antarctica
