= El Negrillar =

Volcanic field in the Andes

- Negros de Aras
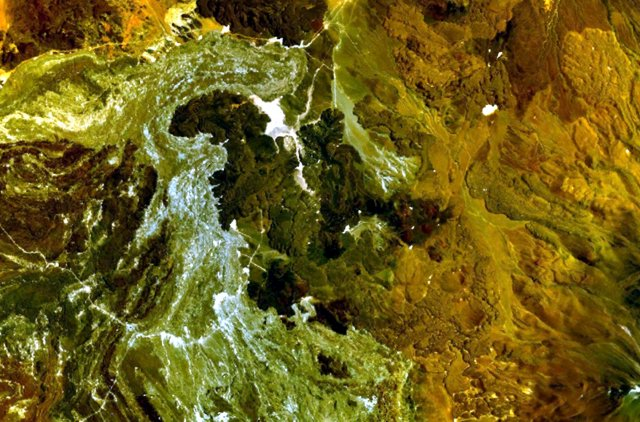
- The cones in the image centre and associated black lava flows form the El Negrillar volcanic field, which covers about 220 square kilometres.

Highest point
- Elevation: 3,500 m (11,500 ft)
- Coordinates: 24.18°S 68.25°W

Geography
- Location within Chile

El Negrillar is a volcanic field in the Andes. Located south of the Salar de Atacama and west of the Cordón de Púlar, it generated cinder cones and lava flows. Covering a surface area of 220 square kilometres (85 sq mi), it is the largest volcanic field in northern Chile, with almost a hundred vents that produced mainly lava flows. Owing to the arid climate, landforms are well preserved. Radiometric dating has yielded ages of less than 1.5 million years, with the most recent eruption occurring about 141,000 years ago. Parts of the Holocene Socompa debris avalanche overlie the field. A groundwater system underlies the volcanic field and some cones formed through phreatomagmatic eruptions. El Negrillar is located in a complex tectonic regime, characterized by numerous faults. The town of Tilomonte and various power lines, mines and water wells are in the area.

== Geography and geomorphology ==
The Central Volcanic Zone (CVZ) of the Andes is a northwest-south trending volcanic arc that extends from Peru over Bolivia to Chile and Argentina and occupies the highest and widest sector of the Andes. Most of its 44 volcanoes are young stratovolcanoes, but there are also monogenetic volcanoes and the Altiplano-Puna volcanic complex, which has produced more than 15,000 cubic kilometres (3,600 cu mi) of volcanic rocks. Stratovolcanoes in the El Negrillar area include Socompa to the south, Pular to the east of the volcanic field, and Aguas Delgadas. Towns in the area include Monturaqui, Peine, Tilomonte, Tilopozo, and a mining camp southwest of the field, there are cross-border power lines, and the local aquifer is pumped by various mining companies in the area just south of the volcanic field. Interest in the monogenetic volcanoes of the area arose in the 2010s and 2020s.

The El Negrillar field, also known as Negros de Aras, is south of the Salar de Atacama, not far from the border between Argentina and Chile, and consists of numerous unvegetated scoria cones and lava flows. It includes 51 vents named after Atacama flora and fauna, and 98 separate lava flows that extend downslope, making it the largest monogenetic volcanic field of northern Chile. Vents have produced mostly lava flows, but there are maars and scoria cones as well. Some cones have been breached when lava flowed out. The lava flows are blocky and have flow forms like scarps, ogives and levees that are well-conserved by the arid climate of the field; the longest flow has a length of 12 kilometres (7.5 mi). The vents are spread over three sectors, and the northern in an eastern and a western sector. The northern and central sectors lie on the Tilomonte and Tilocalár ridges and the southern sector on the northwestern flank of the Aguas Delgadas volcano. The total area covered by the field exceeds 220 square kilometres (85 sq mi).

== Geology ==
Off the western coast of South America, the Nazca Plate subducts beneath the South American Plate. The subduction is responsible for the volcanism of the CVZ and the other two volcanic zones, the Northern Volcanic Zone and the Southern Volcanic Zone. A fourth volcanic zone is known as the Austral Volcanic Zone.

El Negrillar is part of a wider field of monogenetic volcanoes south of Salar de Atacama, which includes Morro Punta Negra, La Negrillar, Tilocalar and Cerro Tujle. Their formation was probably influenced by faulting, as there are north-south trending thrust faults, northwest-southeast trending transverse faults and various types of folds, which enable magma ascent through the 70 kilometres (43 mi) thick crust. Monogenetic activity in the area has progressively migrated north, with the youngest age being the 77,000 ± 54,000 years of Cerro Overo, and the volcanoes share a common magma source. El Negrillar is by far the largest of all these monogenetic volcanic fields.

The surrounding and underlying terrain consists mostly of various volcanic rocks and alluvial fans. A 60 kilometres (37 mi) long north-south trending depression runs south from Salar de Atacama and is filled by water-containing volcanic rocks of the Salín Formation. They form the Monturaqui-Negrillar-Tilopozo groundwater system, which conveys water to the Tilopozo area of Salar de Atacama. The flow and composition of its waters are influenced by the El Negrillar volcanic field, which lies in the middle of the groundwater body and separates it into two halves.

Rocks erupted at El Negrillar have compositions ranging from basaltic andesite to dacite, with some trachytic components, and define a calc-alkaline suite with five distinct members. They contain phenocrysts of amphibole, olivine, plagioclase and pyroxene; quartz has been reported as well. Composition varies from the northern to the southern sector, as magmas of the southern sector are more primitive with fewer crystals and volatiles. The adakite-like composition implies that the magmas originated at great depths, where garnet is stable, from melting of a small fraction of crustal and mantle rocks. The magmas underwent fractional crystallization and during their ascent they absorbed varying quantities of crustal material. The ascending magma stagnates between 9–19 kilometres (5.6–11.8 mi) depth, forming a network of sills where magma evolution processes such as recrystallization take place. Their total volume is about 7.6 cubic kilometres (1.8 cu mi)-6.8 cubic kilometres (1.6 cu mi), making it one of the largest monogenetic volcanic fields worldwide.

== Eruption history ==
El Negrillar formed during the last 1.5 million years in the Pleistocene (Note: Between 1.8 million years and 11,700 years ago.). Eruptions produced lava flows, with subordinate explosive activity, at effusion rates reaching from a few to a few tens of cubic metres per second. Some eruptions may have lasted more than a year. Ages of the volcanoes range from 982,000 ± 8,000 to 141,000 ± 72,000 years, and often do not match the appearance of the vents. It is possible that a change in tectonic regimen from compressive to extensive 780,000 years ago allowed the ascent of magma. Monogenetic eruptions can happen in areas without previous volcanic activity, and are a threat to the Salar de Atacama area and the infrastructure there.

The three vents Copao, Sandillón and Ruda erupted phreatomagmatically; they are tuff cones with infilling lava domes. The phreatomagmatic activity is probably a consequence of magma interaction with the Monturaqui-Negrillar-Tilopozo aquifer. About 7,000 years ago, Socompa volcano collapsed and partly buried the El Negrillar volcanoes.
