= List of Andean peaks with known pre-Columbian ascents =

This is an incomplete list of mountains in the Andes that are known to have had pre-Columbian ascents. It is divided into those peaks for which there is direct evidence of an ascent to the summit, and those peaks where evidence has been found only at a lower altitude on the mountain. Ascents were made for religious purposes by groups affiliated with the Inca Empire. These ascents sometimes involved the ritual child sacrifice known as qhapaq hucha.

== Mountains with known ascents to the summit ==
Name	Elevation (m)	Location	Explanation
Acay	5,770	Argentina	Human bone and walls found on summit
Ampato	6,288	Peru	Juanita mummy found just under summit
Antofalla	6,440	Argentina	Summit shrine
Alto Toroni	5,995	Chile-Bolivia	Large summit platform
Colorado	5,742	Chile	Summit quadrangle
Chachani	6,057	Peru	Summit ruins, skeleton, firewood
Chañi	5,930	Argentina	Summit ruins
Chiliques	5,778	Chile	Summit ruin and firewood
del Plomo	5,424	Chile	Mummy found near summit
Galan	5,912	Argentina	Tombs and statuettes
Incahuasi	6,621	Chile-Argentina	Ruined walls near summit
Laguna Blanca	6,012	Argentina	Large platform and firewood near summit
Licancabur	5,930	Chile-Bolivia	Firewood and structures discovered on summit
Llullaillaco	6,739	Chile-Argentina	Dwellings and shrines on and near summit
Misti	5,842	Peru	walls, firewood, human sacrifices (the largest number of bodies found in The Andes)
Chuscha	5,420	Argentina	Summit platform, ruins, sacrifice victim
Copiapó	6,052	Chile	Summit ruins
Sairecabur	5,971	Chile-Bolivia	Firewood
Tambillos	5,806	Chile-Argentina	Summit platform, firewood
Pili	6,046	Chile	Small summit platform
Tortolas	6,160	Chile-Argentina	Summit platform
Paniri	5,940	Chile	Various structures on summit
Pichu Pichu	5,665	Peru	Walls, human sacrifice, firewood
Pular	6,225	Chile	Small dwelling and firewood found
Queva	6,140	Argentina	1974 expedition found plundered shrine
Reclus	6,275	Argentina	Extensive summit constructions
Sara Sara	5,505	Peru	Stone wall discovered on summit 1921
El Toro	6,168	Chile-Argentina	Mummy found in 1964

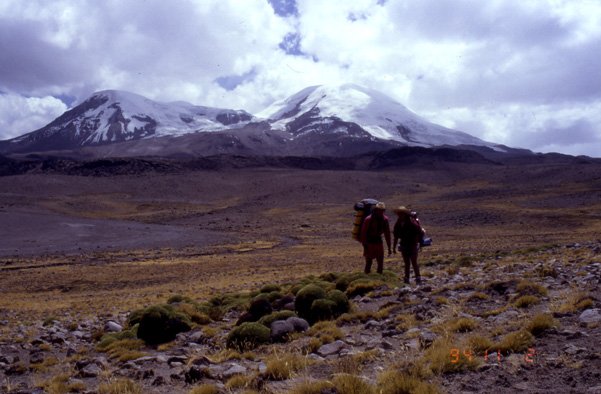
Coropuna, main summit on the left, Kasulla on the right.

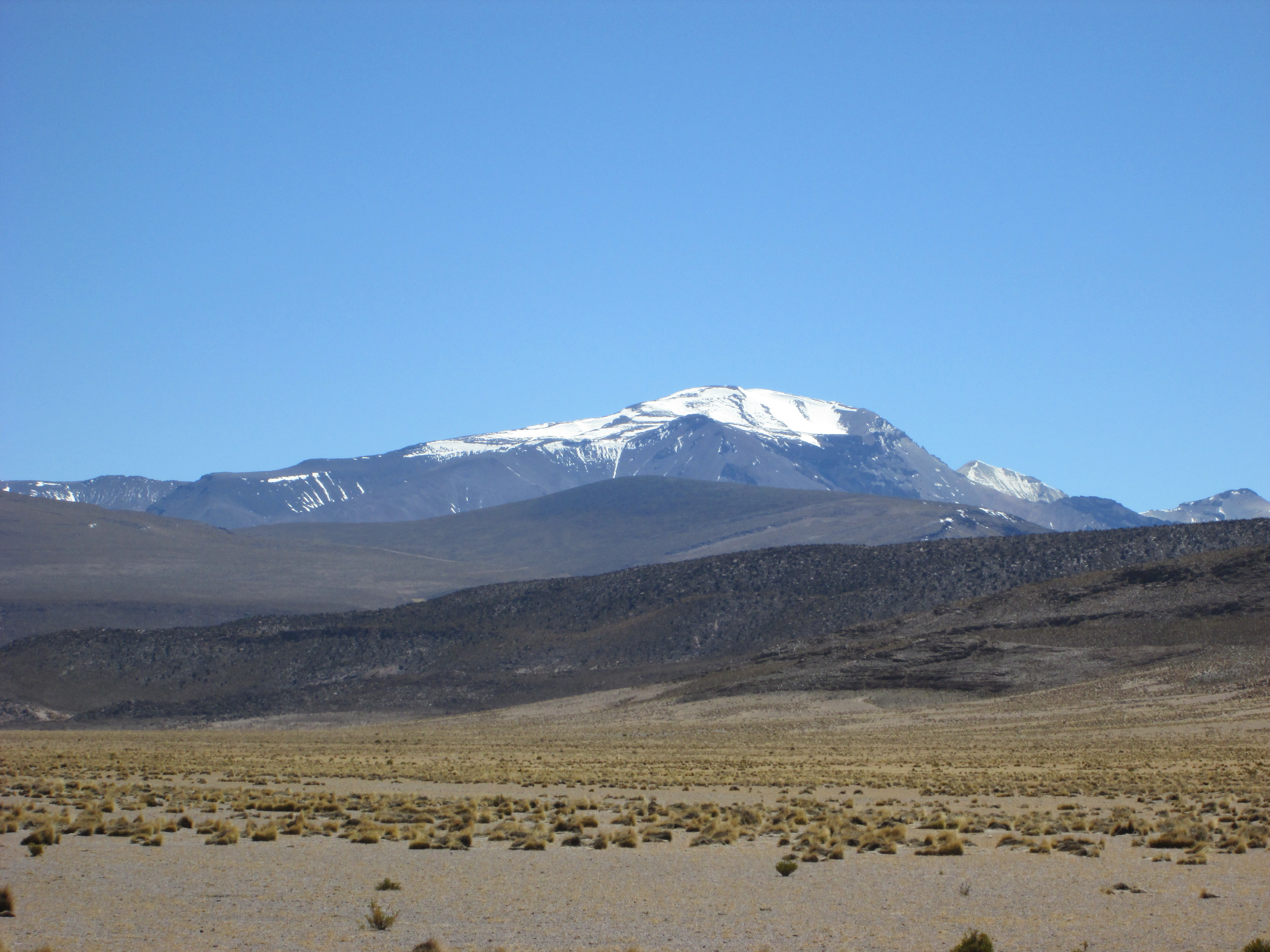
There is a large platform on the summit of Alto Toroni.

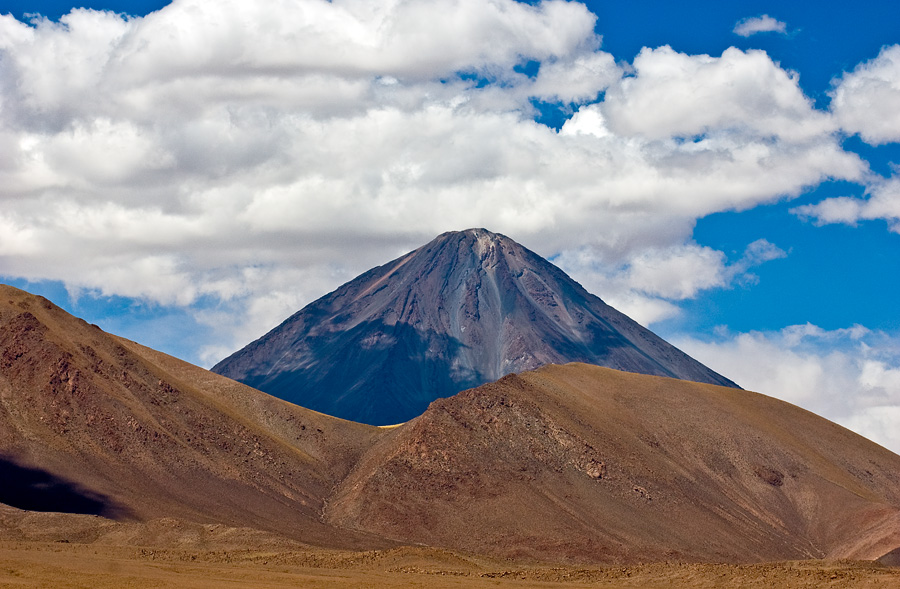
View of Licancabur from near San Pedro de Atacama.

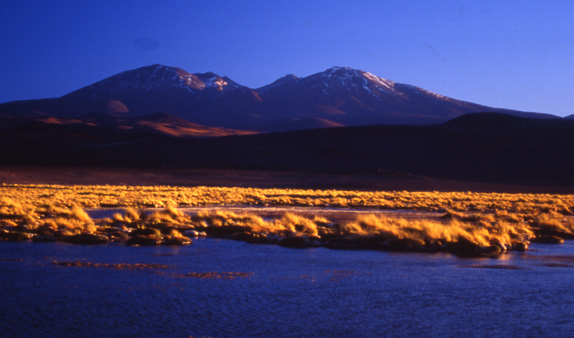
Antofalla seen from the north.

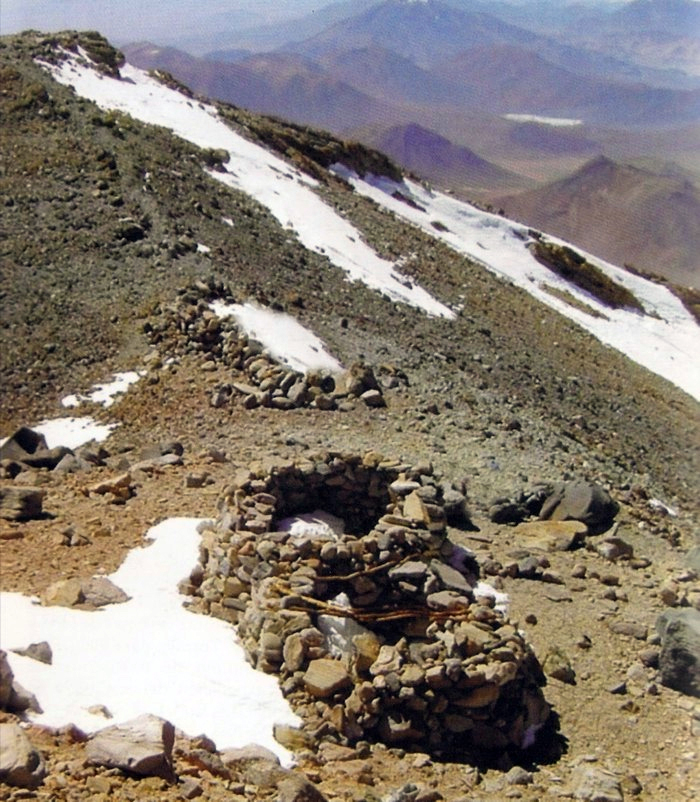
Two small ruined dwellings at about 6700m on Llullaillaco seen from the summit.

== Mountains with evidence found at high altitude ==
Name	Elevation (m)	Location	Explanation
Aconcagua	6,959	Argentina	Guanaco found at c.6900m, Child sacrifice at 5250m
Aucanquilcha	6,176	Chile	Inca ruins at 5400m
Mercedario	6,700	Argentina	Walls at c.6400m on summit ridge
Socompa	6,030	Chile-Argentina	Walls & structures at 5000-5700m
Coropuna	6,425	Peru	Inca pottery found
Hualca Hualca	6,025	Peru	Puma skin & coca leaves found near summit
