= Nevados de Pastos Grandes =

Coordinates: 24°16′S 66°27′W

Nevados de Pastos Grandes is a Miocene volcanic centre in the Puna, Salta province, Argentina. It is a volcanic complex with several centres named El Queva, Gordo and Azufre. Some minor Pleistocene glaciation has affected the volcanic complex.

Volcanic activity has generated first dacitic lava flows and subsequently andesitic lava flows. The beginning, duration and end of the volcanism is uncertain, but some thermal springs persist to the present day. The volcano is part of the Puna volcanic region of the Central Volcanic Zone.

Various mineral deposits are found at Nevados de Pastos Grandes, several of which were exploited for mining. Sulfur and lead-silver are among the minerals mined in the complex.

== Geology ==
The Nevados de Pastos Grandes complex encompasses several volcanic centres, the highest one at 6,130 metres (20,110 ft) is called Cerro Queva or El Queva. The two other centres are named Gordo and Azufre, with some additional minor centres. These centres are aligned in a north-south direction, covering 44 by 26 kilometres (27 mi × 16 mi). The volcanic complex has been affected by physical erosion, which has brought to the surface the deeper parts of the complex. The Pleistocene glaciation has excavated cirques and U-shaped valleys in the western and northern side of Azufre and Gordo above 4,500 metres (14,800 ft). It has left talus and moraines on the upper flanks of the volcano as well as exposing hydrothermally altered areas, chiefly on the western side of the range. Among these are separate moraines on the southwestern slope of Azufre and Quevar and till. Surface exposure dating indicates that these moraines developed during lake highstands in the Salar de Uyuni. Even today, rock glaciers and stone stripes testify to the persistence of glacial activity.

=== Petrology and geology ===
The volcano has generated welded ash flows. Later a stratovolcano was built by lava and pyroclastic flows, with lava flows dominating. As is typical for many Puna volcanoes, the first lava flows that were erupted are dacitic and are exposed in the northern and eastern flanks. They may be Pliocene or Pleistocene in age. Later the main edifice was built by andesitic lavas. Another view treats lava domes formed 8.6±0.5 million years ago as the final activity. In this view, the last activity coincides with the cessation of large ignimbritic volcanism in the northern Puna and is probably linked to a steeper subduction of the Nazca Plate. Thermal springs are still present however. These include the Boratera Antuco spring.

The ash flows are K-rich andesitic-dacitic and contain amphibole and biotite. Andesitic lava flows are also found, while the terminal lava domes are dacitic-rhyolitic in composition. One rhyolite lava flow is found at Azufre. Andesites contain quartz and dacites-rhyodacites contain sanidine megacrysts. In hydrothermally altered areals alunite, barite, dickite, kaolinite, pyrite and quartz are also found. Propylite-like degradation as well as veins contained inside of rock that has been heavily degraded to argillite.

=== Geologic context ===
The volcanic centre is underpinned by an Ordovician basement including metamorphed flysch and phyllites on the western side of the complex. On the eastern side a granite batholith is intruded. It may be of Silurian age. Later Miocene-Pliocene sediments formed in a depositional environment, forming the Pastos Grandes Group. Fault activity has been widespread in the Puna with block faulting, but the volcanoes themselves are little affected by the faulting. However, the alignment of the centres may be linked to a north-south fault.

A unique volcano La Pava-Ramadas is found north of Queva and has generated ash falls as far as the Subandean ranges 8.75 million years ago. The volcano was formed on top of the Calama–Olacapato–El Toro lineament. El Queva is one of many volcanoes in the Puna. Previous volcanism occurred in the east at the Aguas Calientes caldera and probably migrated later to El Queva.

== Human Activity ==
Nevado de Pastos Grandes is a major polymetallic district, including lead, silver and tin. Mineralization post-dates the eruption of the host rocks by less than million years at depths of less than 400–500 metres (1,300–1,600 ft). The formation of these deposits seems to be linked to solfataric alteration. Sulfur is found in the alteration zone and at Azufre. Manganese oxides are found also near the El Queva mine, as well as six other deposits that mostly don't coincide with alteration zones and are found in variable environments. These manganese deposits appear to be associated with former thermal springs.

Sulfur from this system was formerly mined at Azufre. Between 1968 and 1973 a rudimentary mining operation at El Queva mine yielded 3,000 tons of ore. This mine is located at 4,600 metres (15,100 ft) altitude within a 3 kilometres (1.9 mi) long belt that contains lead-silver mineralization within altered dacite.

The area is cold and has an arid climate typical of the Altiplano, with less than 500 millimetres per year (20 in/year) precipitation falling mainly during the summer monsoon. The town of San Antonio de los Cobres is located 53 kilometres (33 mi) northeast. Santa Rosa de los Pastos Grandes is a town southeast of Nevados de Pastos Grandes. A railway and road run around the Nevados de Pastos Grandes range in the northwest. The Alero Cuevas archeological site is located west of Nevados de Pastos Grandes and depended on water coming from the range. Quebrada Alta is another archeological site.

== See also ==
- Antofalla
- Cerro Panizos
- Coranzuli

== Sources ==
- Luna, Lisa V.; Bookhagen, Bodo; Niedermann, Samuel; Rugel, Georg; Scharf, Andreas; Merchel, Silke (October 2018). "Glacial chronology and production rate cross-calibration of five cosmogenic nuclide and mineral systems from the southern Central Andean Plateau". Earth and Planetary Science Letters. 500: 242–253. Bibcode:2018E&PSL.500..242L. doi:10.1016/j.epsl.2018.07.034. ISSN 0012-821X.
- Sillitoe, R. H. (1 November 1975). "Lead-silver, manganese, and native sulfur mineralization within a stratovolcano, El Queva, Northwest Argentina". Economic Geology. 70 (7): 1190–1201. doi:10.2113/gsecongeo.70.7.1190.
