= Cerro Beltrán =

Volcano in the Andes

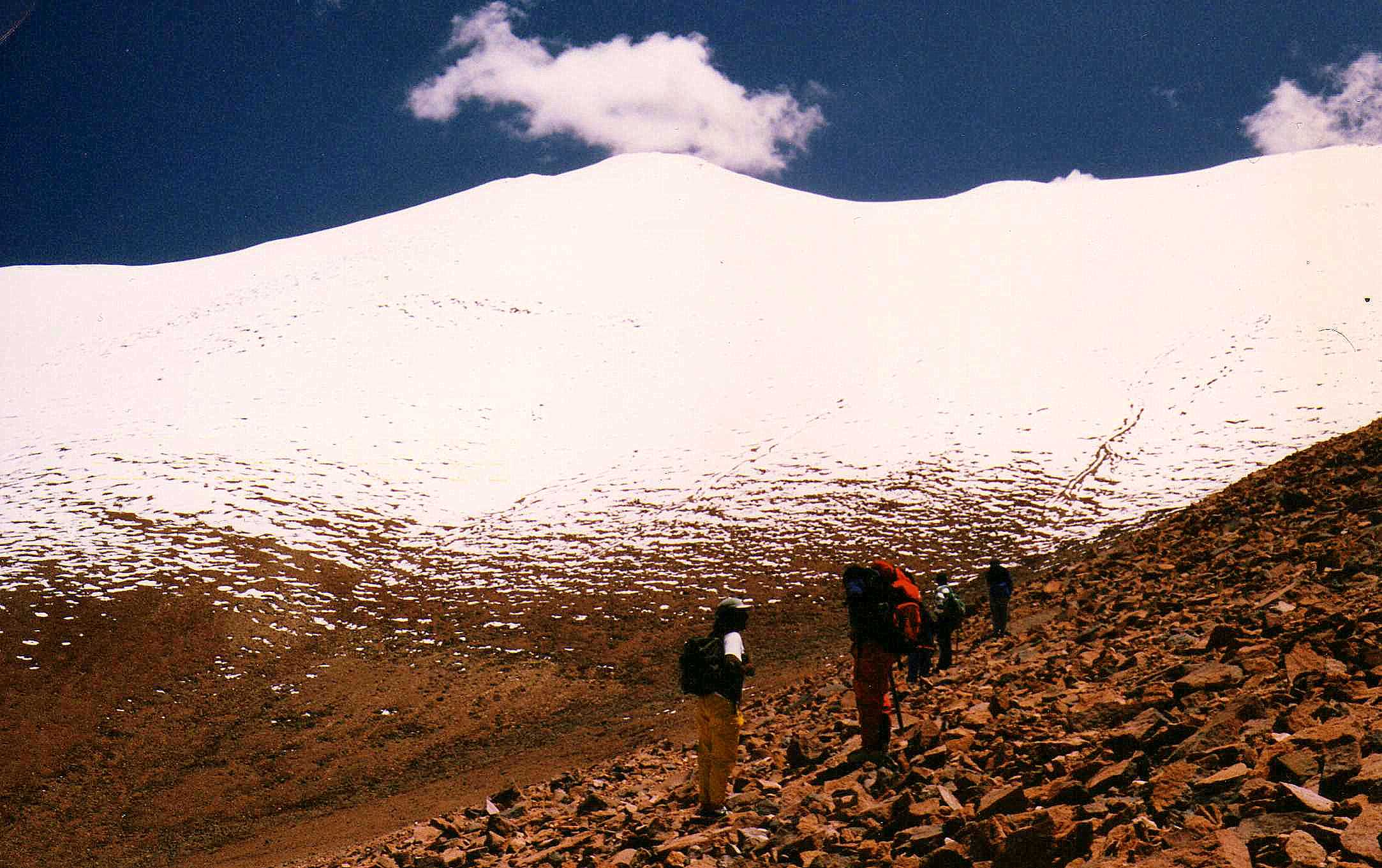

Cerro Beltrán is an andesitic-dacitic volcano in the Andes. It erupted andesitic-dacitic lava flows between 14.1 and 7.7 mya. Based on geochemical considerations, the volcano formed from granite and plagioclase bearing, 33–40 kilometres (21–25 mi) thick crust. Part of the volcano was later covered by ignimbrites coming from the Galán caldera eruption.

The volcano is located next to the Salar de Antofalla. It is one of the large long-lived volcanoes forming the Archibarca-Galan volcanic alignment, along with Tebenquicho, Galán and Antofalla.
