= Antofalla =

Mountain in Argentina

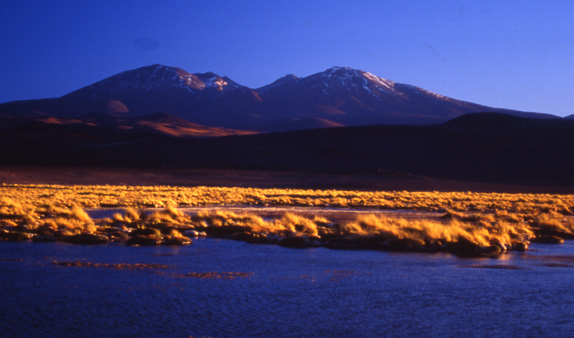
- Antofalla at sunset from the north

Highest point
- Elevation: 6,409 m (21,027 ft)
- Prominence: 1,957 m (6,421 ft)Peakbagger
- Coordinates: 25°33′S 67°53′W

Geography
- Location within Argentina
- Location: Catamarca, Argentina
- Parent range: Andes

Geology
- Mountain type: Stratovolcano
- Last eruption: Unknown

Climbing
- First ascent: Inca, Pre-Columbian (before 1500)

Antofalla is a Miocene–Pliocene volcano in Argentina's Catamarca Province. It is part of the volcanic segment of the Andes in Argentina, and it is considered to be part of the Central Volcanic Zone, one of the volcanic zones of the Andes. Antofalla forms a group of volcanoes that are aligned on and behind the main volcanic arc. Antofalla itself is a remote volcano.

Antofalla and other Andean volcanoes form because the Nazca Plate is subducting beneath the South American Plate. Antofalla volcano is located in a region with a "basins and ranges" topography, where during the Miocene ranges were uplifted and basins formed through tectonic movement. It sits on a basement formed by Eocene-Miocene sedimentary units over a much older crystalline basement.

Antofalla is formed by a principal volcano, the 6,409-metre (21,027 ft) high Antofalla volcano proper, and a surrounding complex of smaller volcanic systems that are formed by lava flows and pyroclastic material. The whole complex was active between 10.89 and 1.59 million years ago; whether activity occurred in historical time is unclear.

== Name ==
The mountain is first attested in a map of 1900 as Antofaya, although an earlier map in 1632 uses the name Antiofac for the whole region. The name may be derived from anta, anti, antu, which means "metal" (especially "copper") in the indigenous language Quechua. Pedro Armengol Valenzuela hypothesized that the second part of the name is pallay, "collect"; thus the name Antofalla would mean "collection of copper". Another theory is that Antofalla is derived from the Diaguita language.

== Geography and structure ==
Antofalla lies in the Antofagasta de la Sierra department of the northern Catamarca Province, in northwestern Argentina. The towns of Antofalla, Puesto Cuevas, Botijuela and Potrero Grande are east, southeast, south and southwest of the volcano, respectively. Gravel roads run along the northern, northeastern and east-southeast-southern sides of the volcanic complex, but the volcano is difficult to access. Precolumbian constructions, including a platform on the summit of Antofalla, have been found.

Antofalla is part of the Central Volcanic Zone of the Andes, which runs along the border between Argentina and Chile and whose main expression occurs in the Western Cordillera. The volcanoes of the Central Volcanic Zone lie at high altitudes, and the volcanic zone spans the countries of Argentina, Bolivia, Chile and Peru. Present-day activity in the Central Volcanic Zone occurs at Lascar and Lastarria, and about 44 centres have been active in the Holocene. Aside from stratovolcanoes, calderas with large ignimbrites are also part of the Central Volcanic Zone; the Altiplano–Puna volcanic complex is a complex of such large calderas.

Antofalla is a cluster of stratovolcanoes, with the 6,409-metre (21,027 ft) high Antofalla volcano at its centre. An altar with a stone pyramid lies on its summit, there are reports of monoliths, and the mountains Llullaillaco, Pajonales and Pular can be seen from the top of the mountain.

A number of other centres developed around the main Antofalla volcano, forming a 50-kilometre (31 mi) wide volcanic area; counterclockwise from the north these are:

- 5,804-metre (19,042 ft) high Cerro Onas
- 5,765-metre (18,914 ft) high Cerro Patos (with the neighbouring 5,761-metre (18,901 ft) high Cerro Ojo de Antofalla)
- 5,704-metre (18,714 ft) or 5,783-metre (18,973 ft) high Cerro Lila
- 5,700-metre (18,700 ft) or 5,787-metre (18,986 ft) high Cerro Cajeros
- 5,750-metre (18,860 ft) or 5,785-metre (18,980 ft) high Cerro de la Aguada, also known as Cerro Botijuelas
- Cerro Bajo-Cerro Onas
- 5,656-metre (18,556 ft) high Conito de Antofalla.

These volcanic centres overlap with each other, are all much smaller than the main Antofalla volcano and have experienced little erosion. All these volcanoes are formed by lava domes, lava flows and pyroclastic units. Ignimbrites are also found and one of these forms Cerro Onas, while a more recent one occurs in the Quebrada de las Cuevas area. Between Cerro de la Aguada and Cerro Cajeros lies the Cerro la Botijuela obsidian dome. On the western and southwestern side of the complex, some cinder cones can be found, and fissure vents linked to faults cut through the volcanic complex. Finally, a sector collapse deposit and collapse amphitheatre can be observed at Quebrada de las Minas and Quebrada el Volcán. A large scale topographic anomaly surrounds the entire volcanic complex, and seismic tomography has shown the presence of low-velocity anomalies linked to the volcanic group.

The Salar de Antofalla, one of the largest salt pans in the world, lies southeast of the Antofalla complex. It is one of many salt pans that developed within closed basins of the region and its surface lies at an elevation of 3,340 metres (10,960 ft); other such salt pans include Salar Archibarca north-northwest of Antofalla, Salina del Fraile south-southwest and Salar del Rio Grande northwest. There also are several lakes such as Laguna Las Lagunitas on the northeastern foot of Antofalla, Laguna Patos west of Cerro Lila – Cerro Ojo de Antofalla and Laguna Cajeros southwest of Cerro Lila – Cerro Cajeros. Most of the northwestern flank of the main Antofalla volcano drains into the Salar de Archibarca, while the southeastern flank has drainages connecting it to the Salar de Antofalla through the (from northeast to southwest) Quebrada de las Cuevas, Quebrada del Volcan and Quebrada de las Minas; the latter two join before entering the salt pan in a large fan, the Campo del Volcán. Northeast of the Conito de Antofalla, the Rio Antofalla originates and flows southeastward into the Salar de Antofalla in a large alluvial fan, similar to other drainages that enter the Salar de Antofalla. South of Antofalla lies Vega Botijuela, where there are two hot springs. One of them discharges 32 °C (90 °F) warm water at a rate of 2–4 cubic metres per minute (33–67 L/s) from the Botijuela normal fault, has emplaced a 550 metres (1,800 ft) wide travertine. There is an artificial man-made pool. Apart from the active springs, at Botijuela there are deposits from inactive springs including a conspicuous travertine cone, an extinct geyser. Other warm springs in the area are Vega Antofalla, El Hervidero and Te bén Grande; they may be nourished by thermal waters that ascent on faults.

== Geology ==
Off the western coast of South America, the Nazca Plate subducts beneath the South American Plate at a rate of about 10 centimetres per year (3.9 in/year); this subduction is responsible for volcanic activity in the Central Volcanic Zone and elsewhere in the Andes. Volcanism does not occur along the entire length of the subduction zone; north of 15° and south of 28° the subducting plate moves downward at a shallower angle and this is associated with the absence of volcanic activity. Other volcanic zones exist in the Andes, including the Northern Volcanic Zone in Colombia and Ecuador and the Southern Volcanic Zone also in Chile. A furtherourth volcanic zone, the Austral Volcanic Zone, is caused by the subduction of the Antarctic Plate beneath the South American Plate and lies south of the Southern Volcanic Zone.

A fault runs in north–south direction in the western part of the Antofalla complex. Many geologic lineaments control tectonics across the whole region, they direct the ascent of magma and the location of basins; some of these lineaments exist since the Precambrian. One of these lineaments in the region trends north-northeast and separates the Arequipa-Antofalla terrane from the Pampia terrane.

=== Geologic record ===
The regional geography developed during the Middle and Late Miocene, when basins and ranges were formed by thrusting and subsidence; the basins were filled with evaporites above older molasse-like material, while the ranges are mainly formed by Paleozoic rocks. Precambrian and Late Cretaceous rocks crop out in the Eastern Cordillera on the eastern margin of the Puna. The tectonic activity decreased about 9 million years ago, with the exception of a brief reactivation less than 4 million years ago. The present-day southern Puna is tectonically quiescent, although fault scarps indicate recent ground movements.

The oldest volcanic activity occurred during the Permian and early Jurassic, and the present-day manifestations consist mainly of lava and pyroclastic material. During the Cenozoic, a number of now inactive volcanoes and ignimbrites, the latter of which typically have volumes of less than 10 cubic kilometres (2.4 cu mi), erupted in the region. Only less than 15-centimetre (5.9 in) thick ignimbrites were deposited during the Eocene-early Miocene, probably from vents in the Coastal Cordillera. During the Eocene, the subduction became shallower, moving volcanism eastward into the main Andes. Volcanic activity dramatically increased during the Miocene, during which large stratovolcanoes and ignimbrites were emplaced; it is often not clear from which centre a given ignimbrite is sourced from. Later volcanic activity was characterized by the emplacement of ignimbrites and of monogenetic volcanoes, which consist of cinder cones and lava flows with small volumes. Some of these cones are partially eroded, other ones have a fresh appearance and these are as little as 200,000 ± 90,000 years old, with even more recent (Holocene) activity possible. While the Miocene phase of high activity was linked to a fast subduction regime, the monogenetic activity may be linked to delamination of the crust beneath the Puna instead as well as with a change in tectonic regime that favoured crustal extension. The transition between the two volcanic phases was characterized by a decrease in volcanic activity.

The Juan Fernández Ridge was subducted in the region between 11–8 million years ago according to Kraemer et al. 1999. This may have generated a flat subduction profile and thus allowed volcanic arc-like volcanism to occur in the region behind the actual volcanic arc.

=== Local ===
Antofalla lies in the Salar de Antofalla area of the Argentine Puna, a high plateau located over a thick crust of the Andes. It is a basin and range-like region with volcanoes. Before the Neogene the region was not part of the Andes proper, being located behind the mountain chain, and was integrated into the mountain chain by tectonic movements.

Antofalla together with neighbouring Cerro Archibarca, Cerro Beltrán and Tebenquicho is part of a group of long lived volcanic complexes that developed in the Argentine Puna; the first and the last of these lie due north and northeast of Antofalla, respectively. All of them appear to be associated with a lineament known as the Archibarca lineament, which crosses the Andes in northwest–southeast direction, and which additionally includes the Escondida ore occurrence and the volcanoes Llullaillaco, Corrida de Cori and Galán. This lineament may be an area where the crust is unusually weak. Other such lineaments in the Andes are the Calama-Olacapato-El Toro lineament and the Culampajá one. Seismic tomography has found a low-velocity zone under Antofalla, which may be an active magma body.

The terrain beneath the volcano is formed in part by the crystalline basement of Precambrian-Paleozoic ("Antofalla Metamorphites") age mainly north of the volcano and often interpreted as ophiolite, and by sedimentary units of Eocene-Miocene age that crop out on its southern side and by a conglomerate unit known as the Potrero Grande Formation. Parts of the basement crop out where it have been exposed by erosion, such as in the Rio Antofalla and the Quebrada de las Minas, and more generally in two sectors north and south of the volcano.

=== Composition ===
Antofalla has erupted andesite and dacite, with dacite dominant and rhyolite a less common rock type; the entire spectrum from basaltic andesite to rhyolite has been found. Thin lava flows form most of the basalt-like rocks, which are subordinate at Antofalla. The rocks have a porphyric texture and contain phenocrysts including biotite, clinopyroxene, hornblende, ilmenite, magnetite, olivine, orthopyroxene, plagioclase, quartz and sanidine; not all of these occur in every rock.

Magma genesis appears to involve extensive interactions with the lower crust, a process which at first gave rise to rhyolitic material; later the now heavily altered crust interacted less with newer magmas and thus a more basaltic andesite-andesite-dacite unit developed.

Hydrothermal alteration has occurred on the southeastern flanks of the complex at Quebrada de las Minas and on Antofalla's western flank. Volcanic systems like Antofalla and volcano-plutonic complexes often develop mineral deposits through hydrothermal and epithermal processes; such has also happened at Antofalla, yielding occurrences of gold, lead, silver and zinc. These became targets of mining operations:

- The latter three extracted on the eastern side of Antofalla in the old Los Jesuitas mine.
- There are ruins of a gold mining settlement close to the town of Antofalla.
- A map of 1900 mentions the existence of an Antofaya silver mine on the southeastern side of the complex.
- A more recent map showing the existence of a mining site on Quebrada de las Minas.

Mining at Antofalla goes back to 1700 at least, and infrastructure includes mills. Significant ore deposits may exist at the volcano, but their deep burial in the poorly eroded volcanic complex hampers their exploitation.

== Climate, vegetation and fauna ==
Antofalla lies in a region of arid climate, with about 150 millimetres per year (5.9 in/year) precipitation, much of it in the form of snow at high elevations. Temperatures change drastically from day to night and vice versa, ranging from −20–40 °C (−4–104 °F) in the wider region; the climate has been characterized as continental. The region lies between two major climatic regimes, a northerly regime dominated by easterly moisture flows which occur during summer, and a southerly regime where westerlies transport moisture from the west mainly in winter.

Vegetation is scarce in the region. Where water is available, marsh vegetation and the so-called pajonales and tolares form; Deyeuxia, Festuca and Stipa grasses make up the former and Adesmia, Acantholippia, Baccharis, Fabiana, Senecio and Parastrephia thorn-bearing bushes the latter.

Animals in the region include llamas, various rodents and vicuñas, as well as carnivores such as Darwin's rhea, pumas and South American foxes. Human hunters were also active in the region and have left a number of archeological traces, including projectiles and trenches where hunters hid from prey. The extreme climate and scarcity of water restrict human habitation to small areas, however.

=== Climatological implications ===
During winter snow covers the peaks; meltwater formed during spring has cut gullies into the mountains. There are not many creeks on Antofalla that carry water year round, although deep ravines with evidence of flash flood activity can be discerned.

The main Antofalla volcano may have been glaciated during the Pleistocene, but this is disputed especially for the lower mountains of the complex. It is likely that in the past, more water was available and led to the deposition of alluvial fans at the margins of basins although there is no evidence that a lake ever formed in the Salar de Antofalla, unlike in other salars farther north. Indeed, the early Holocene was colder and wetter than present-day, and precipitation may have reached 0.5 metres per year (20 in/year).

== Eruptive history ==
The Antofalla complex has been active from the Miocene 11 million years ago into the Quaternary and has generated a large variety of volcanic rocks; it is thus considered to be a very long-lived volcano. The subsidiary peaks around Antofalla were all considered to be extinct by Ferdinand von Wolff.

The first phase of volcanic activity occurred between 10.89 and 10.1 million years ago. At that time, eruptions covered the terrain beneath the volcano with ignimbrites of rhyolitic composition. Subsequently, lava flows of mafic (Note: A volcanic rock relatively rich in iron and magnesium, relative to silicium.) to trachydacitic composition were emplaced, in part on top of the earlier ignimbrites. Between 9.09 and 1.59 million years ago activity was continuous and dominated by lava flows of andesitic to dacitic composition, which constructed the main Antofalla volcano and the surrounding vents. Small felsic (Note: Volcanic rocks enriched in elements that are not easily included into a crystal, such as aluminium, potassium, silicium and sodium.) eruptions generating lava domes and ignimbrites concluded this activity, with the ignimbrite in Quebrada de las Cuevas dated to 1.59 ± 0.08 million years ago. Other volcanic units attributed to this volcanic complex are the Aguas Calientes basalt, the Los Patos ignimbrite of lower Pliocene age and the Tambería Ignimbrite.

Even later, several mafic centres grew southwest and west of the Antofalla complex. Fumarolic activity continues to this day, the existence of geysers was reported in 1962 and traces of an extinct geyser such as sinter structures have been found at Botijuelas. There are reports that the main volcano "smoked" occasionally such as in 1901 and 1911 and Antofalla is sometimes incorrectly considered the highest active volcano in the world, but the Global Volcanism Program considers the complex as Pleistocene in age, and no clear evidence of Holocene activity is found.

== Climbing ==
The first recorded ascent was by Jorge Cvitanic, Benito Rubio and Augusto Vallmitjana on the 26 August 1955. Antofalla is a technically simple climb and there are guides in the region. The main Antofalla volcano can be ascended in three days, although the paths are not always easy to reach by vehicle. Low temperatures and high wind are common issues.
