= Pular =

Pular may refer to:

- Pular language, a Fula language, spoken mainly in Guinea, West Africa
- Pular (volcano), in Chile
