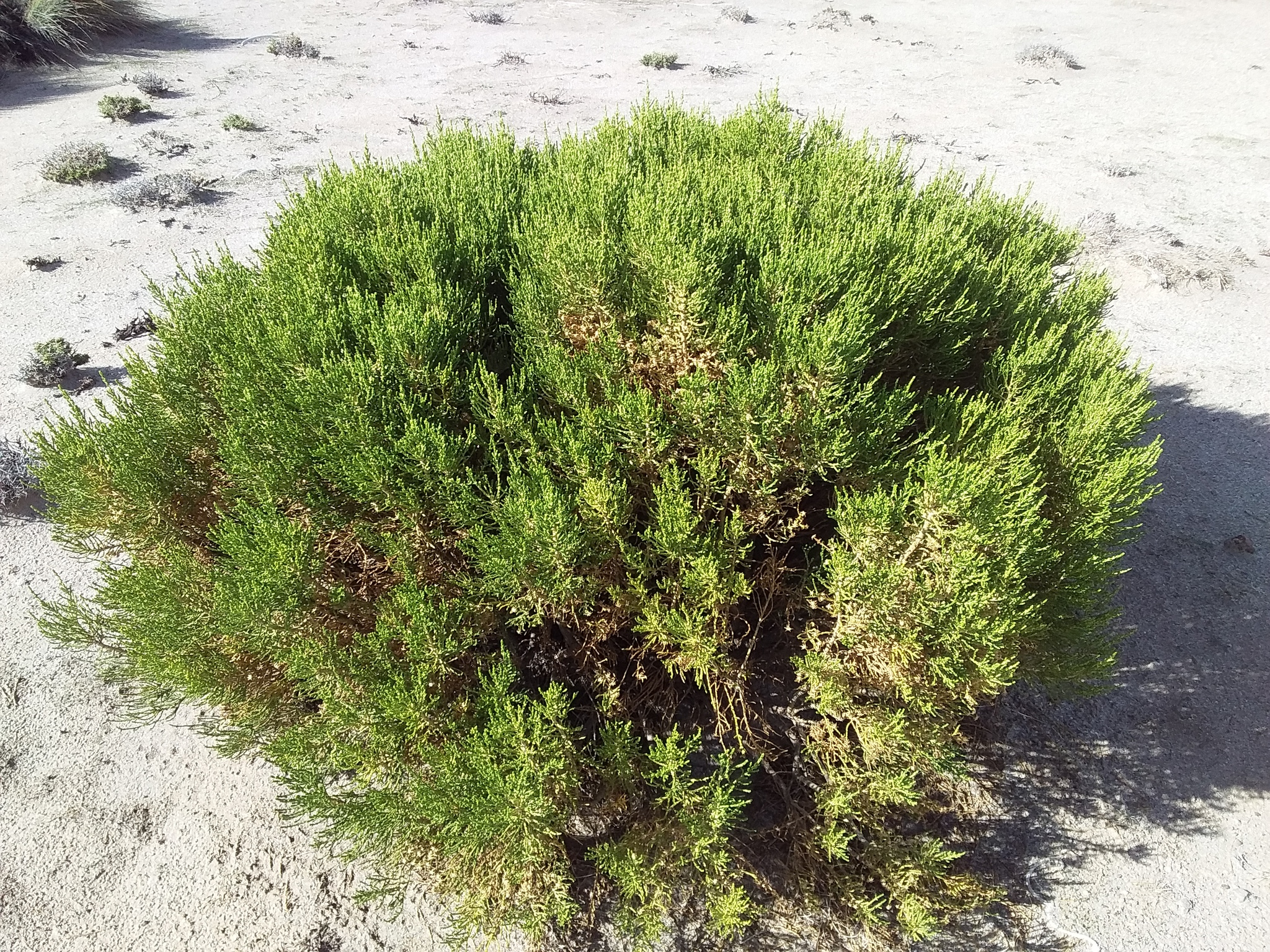

Scientific classification
- Kingdom: Plantae
- Clade: Tracheophytes
- Clade: Angiosperms
- Clade: Eudicots
- Clade: Asterids
- Order: Asterales
- Family: Asteraceae
- Genus: Parastrephia
- Species: P. lepidophylla

Binomial name
- Parastrephia lepidophylla (Wedd.) Cabrera

Synonyms
- Lepidophyllum tola Cabrera

= Parastrephia lepidophylla =

Species of flowering plant

Parastrephia lepidophylla, commonly known as tola or tola tola, is a species of flowering plant in the family Asteraceae. It is native to South America and has been recorded from Argentina, Bolivia, Chile and Peru where it is characteristic of the puna grassland ecoregion. It is a resinous shrub, growing up to 2 m in height, that is typically found in semi-arid central Andean dry, or tola heath, puna habitats, at altitudes of 3500–5000 m above sea level, and in the undergrowth of central Andean Polylepis forest.

== Uses ==
In north-western Argentina the smoke from burning the leaves of the plant has been used externally as an aid in hastening childbirth.
