= Cerro Pajonales =

Pajonales
- Location within Chile

Highest point
- Elevation: 5,958 m (19,547 ft)
- Prominence: 461 m (1,512 ft)
- Parent peak: Pular
- Coordinates: 24°14′15.72″S 068°7′04.08″W

Geography
- Parent range: Chilean Andes, Andes

Climbing
- First ascent: 02/10/1996 - José Martínez Hernández, Ricardo Artalejo, Luis Bernardo Durand, Eduardo Ruiz (Spain)

Cerro Pajonales is a peak in Chile with an elevation of 5,958 metres (19,547 ft) metres. Pajonales is within the following mountain ranges: Chilean Andes, Puna de Atacama. It is on the border of 2 provinces: Chilean provinces of El Loa and Antofagasta. Its slopes are within the administrative boundaries of the2 cities: Chilean cities of San Pedro de Atacama and Antofagasta.

== First Ascent ==
Pajonales was first climbed by José Martínez Hernández, Ricardo Artalejo, Luis Bernardo Durand, Eduardo Ruiz (Spain) in 02/10/1996. During the first ascent by the Spanish, they found a metal bar on the summit, so the first modern ascent of Pajonales is unknown. This is probably by topographers or miners - Research by Guillermo Almaraz.

== Elevation ==
Other data from available digital elevation models: ASTER filled 5935 metres, ALOS metres, TanDEM-X 5980 metres, The height of the nearest key col is 5497 meters, leading to a topographic prominence of 461 meters. Pajonales is considered a Mountain according to the Dominance System and its dominance is 7.74%. Its parent peak is Pular and the Topographic isolation is 6.6 kilometers.
