= Nevado Queva =

Mountain in Argentina

- Quewa or Quevar
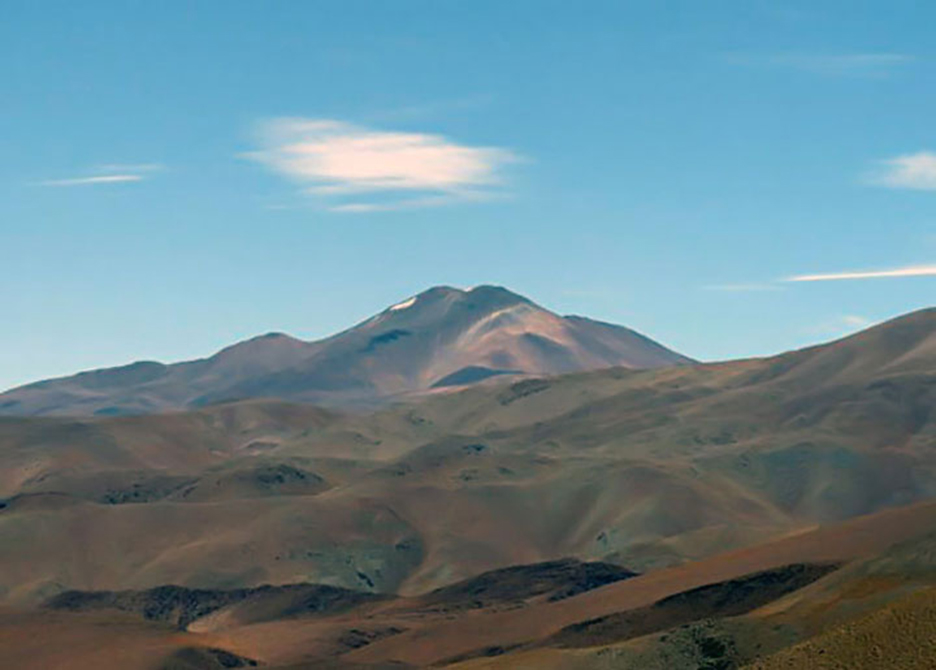

Highest point
- Elevation: 6,140 m (20,140 ft)
- Prominence: 1,644 m (5,394 ft)
- Parent peak: Nevado de Cachi
- Listing: Ultra
- Coordinates: 24°18′27″S 66°44′00″W

Geography
- Location within Argentina
- Location: Salta, Argentina
- Parent range: Andes

Climbing
- First ascent: pre-Columbian

Nevado Queva or Quewar is a volcano in the Andes mountain range of South America, located in the Salta Province of Argentina. Queva has a summit elevation of 6,140 metres (20,144 ft) above sea level. Its name is alternately spelled Quehuar. There are extensive pre-Columbian ruins on the summit of the mountain, which is a broad crater.

It stands as the tallest peak in Nevados de los Pastos Grandes and falls within the Argentinean Provincial Fauna Reserve Los Andes. It is located within the territory of the Argentinean province of Salta. Its slopes are within the administrative boundaries of the Argentinean city of San Antonio de los Cobres.

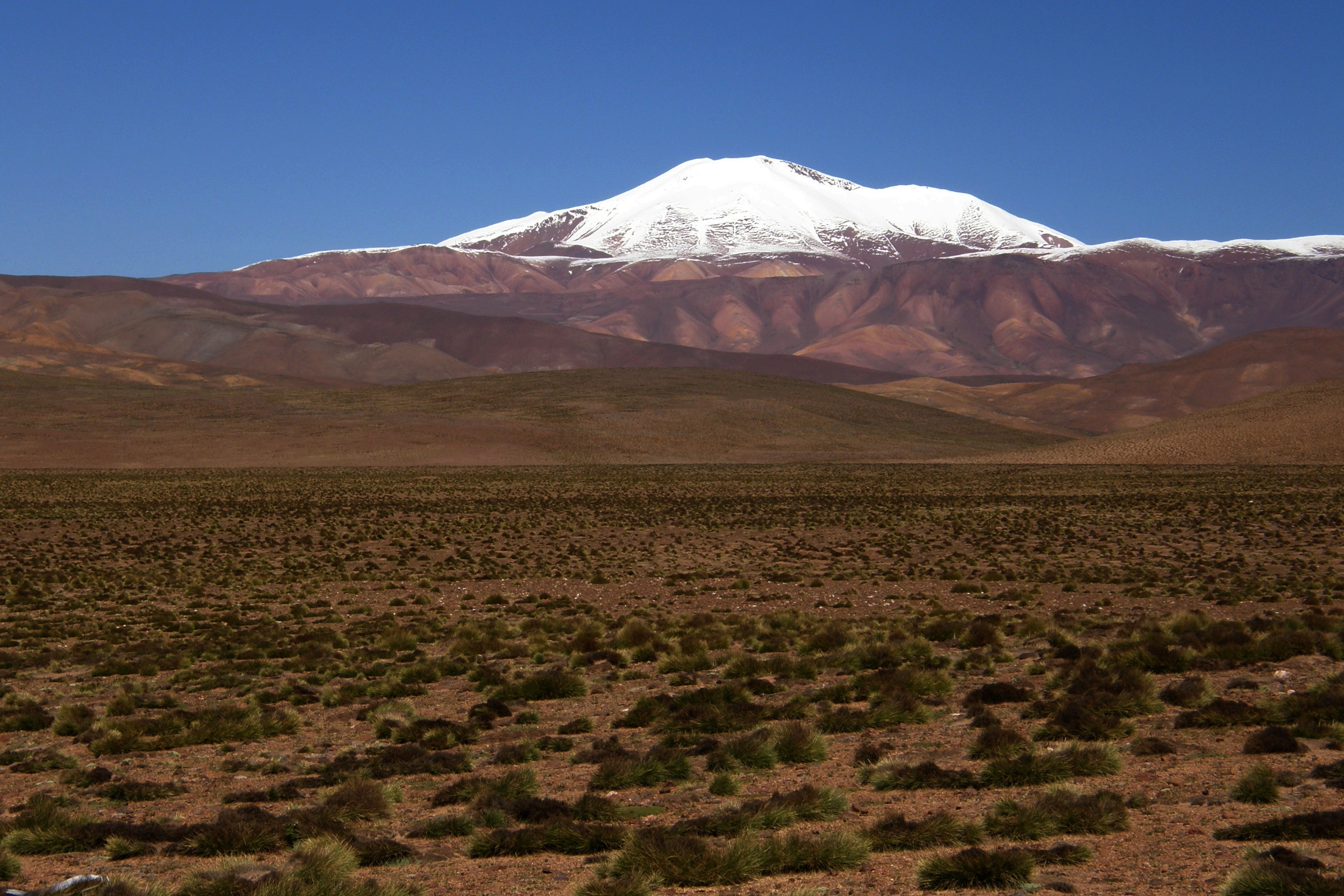
Nevado de Quewar

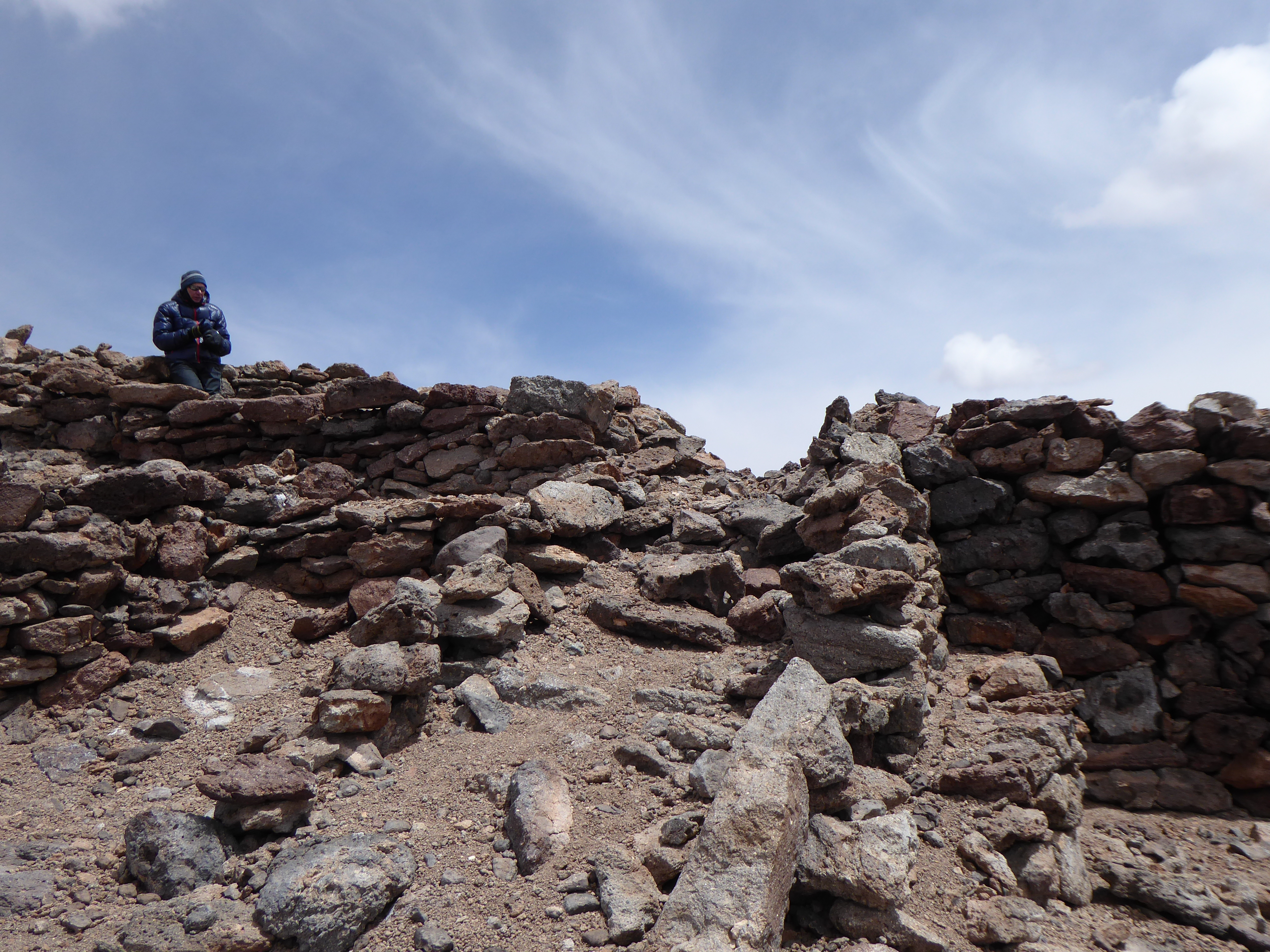
Pre-Columbian ruins on the summit of Nevado Queva

== First Ascent ==
Quewar was climbed by the Incas as evidenced by a platform measuring 80 square metres at the summit; this platform was first documented in the modern era in 1974 by Antonio Beorchia Nigris. The first recorded modern ascent was by Julio Oscar Ramirez (Argentina) on 22 May 1954.

== Elevation ==
Other data from available digital elevation models: SRTM yields 6136 metres, ASTER 6105 metres and TanDEM-X 6177 metres. The height of the nearest key col is 4506 meters, leading to a topographic prominence of 1644 meters. Quewar is considered a Mountain Range according to the Dominance System and its dominance is 26.73%. Its parent peak is Nevado de Cachi and the Topographic isolation is 77.4 kilometers.

== See also ==
- List of mountains in the Andes
- List of Ultras of South America
- Nevados de Pastos Grandes
- List of Andean peaks with known pre-Columbian ascents
