= Cerro Archibarca =

Volcano in the Andes

Coordinates: 25°15′S 67°50′W

Cerro Archibarca is a volcano in the Andes, in Salta Province, Argentina. It covers a surface area of 20 square kilometres (7.7 sq mi). Lava flows descend from a conical edifice. It was active 11 million years ago. The youngest deposits are eroded andesites on the northern side.

A major volcaniclastic unit is associated with Archibarca, named the La Torre formation after the valley where its lower bright red unit reaches a thickness of 20 metres (66 ft). The red unit is formed from unconsolidated pyroclastics with spherical clasts (3 centimetres (1.2 in) up to 10 centimetres (3.9 in)). Granite and pumice are materials also present in this unit. The upper white unit is a thick pyroclastic flow from Archibarca. A 30 metres (98 ft) thick rhyolitic flow with banding structures is also present as well as an associated lava dome that intruded the La Torre formation on the volcano's southern side.

Andesites from this volcano are partly derived from crustal assimilation, with the crustal component constituting 40% of total rock. The Caballo Muerto and Archibarca ignimbrites may be derived from this volcano.
