= Socompa =

Mountain on the Argentina–Chile border

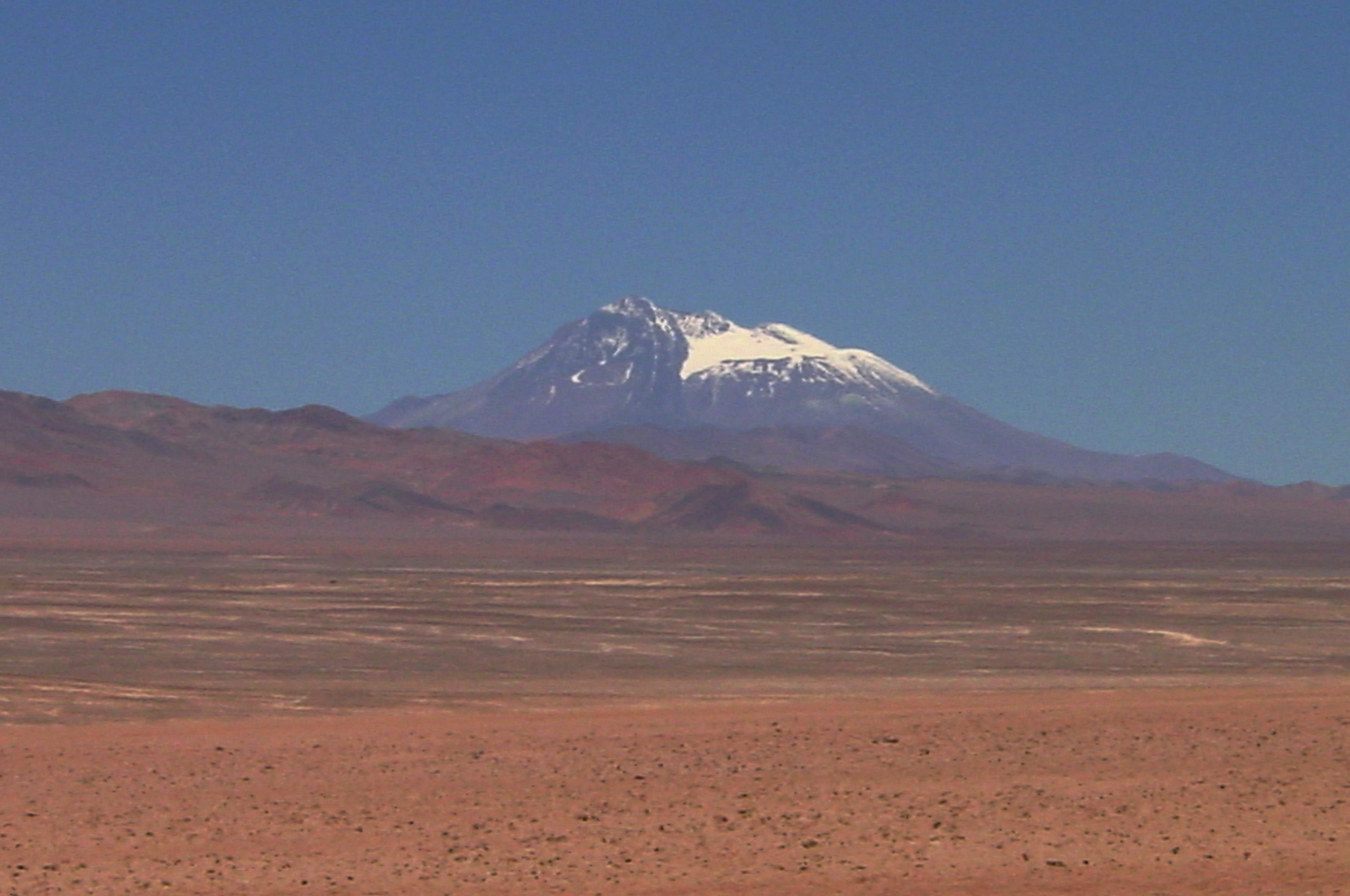
- Socompa as seen from near the Salar de Imilac

Highest point
- Elevation: 6,051 m (19,852 ft)
- Prominence: 2,015 m (6,611 ft)
- Parent peak: Ojos del Salado
- Listing: Ultra
- Coordinates: 24°23′45″S 68°14′45″W

Geography
- Location within Argentina
- Location: Argentina – Chile
- Parent range: Andes

Geology
- Mountain type: Stratovolcano
- Last eruption: 5,910 ± 430 years ago

Climbing
- First ascent: 1905

Socompa is a large stratovolcano (composite volcano) on the border of Argentina and Chile. It has an elevation of 6,051 metres (19,852 ft) and is part of the Chilean and Argentine Andean Volcanic Belt (AVB). Socompa is within the Central Volcanic Zone, one of the segments of the AVB, which contains about 44 active volcanoes. It begins in Peru and runs first through Bolivia and Chile, and then Argentina and Chile. Socompa lies close to the pass of the same name where the Salta-Antofagasta railway crosses the Chilean border.

Most of the northwestern slope of Socompa collapsed catastrophically 7,200 years ago to form an extensive debris avalanche deposit. The Socompa collapse is among the largest known on land with a volume of 19.2 cubic kilometres (4.6 cu mi) and a surface area of 490 square kilometres (190 sq mi); its features are well-preserved by the arid climate. The deposit was at first considered to be either a moraine or a pyroclastic flow deposit, until the 1980 eruption of Mount St. Helens prompted awareness of the instability of volcanic edifices and the existence of large-scale collapses. There are large toreva blocks, which were left behind within the collapse crater. After the landslide, the volcano was rebuilt by the effusion of lava flows and much of the scar is now filled in.

Socompa is also noteworthy for the high-altitude biotic communities that are bound to fumaroles on the mountain. They are well above the sparse regular vegetation in the region, which does not extend up the mountains. The climate on the mountain is cold and dry.

== Geography and geomorphology ==
Socompa is on the border between Argentina and Chile, east-southeast of the Monturaqui railway station of the Salta–Antofagasta railway. (Note: On the Argentine side known as the General Manuel Belgrano Railway.) The railway crosses the border between the two countries just below Socompa, making the volcano easily accessible despite its remote location. The same pass was an important route between the two countries and reportedly between 1940 and 1970 the Carabineros de Chile had a post there. Rails and roads at Socompa go up to an elevation of 3,860 metres (12,660 ft); from there the volcano can be climbed from its southern, eastern and northern flank. The mountain is considered to be an apu by the local population, and Inca constructions (Note: Buildings, wood and a ceremonial road.) have been reported either from its slopes or from its summit. The name comes from the Kunza language and may be related to socke and sokor, which mean "spring" or "arm of water". Presently, the volcano is within two protected areas.

The volcano is part of the Central Volcanic Zone, one of the four volcanic zones of the Andean Volcanic Belt. This volcanic zone spans Peru, Bolivia, Chile and Argentina and contains about 44 active volcanoes and several monogenetic volcanoes and silicic caldera volcanoes. Some older inactive volcanoes are well-preserved owing to the dry climate of the region. Many of these volcanoes are in remote regions and thus are poorly studied, but pose little threat to humans. The largest historical eruption in the Central Volcanic Zone occurred in 1600 at Huaynaputina in Peru, and the recently most active volcano is Lascar in Chile.

Socompa is a 6,051-metre-high (19,852 ft) (Note: Different topographic maps report different heights; in 1902 it was considered to be 5,980 metres (19,620 ft) high. Other data from digital elevation models: SRTM yields 6,017 metres (19,741 ft), ASTER 5,998 metres (19,678 ft), SRTM filled with ASTER6,018 metres (19,744 ft), ALOS 5,998 metres (19,678 ft) and TanDEM-X 6,066 metres (19,902 ft).) (Note: The height of the nearest key col is 5,320 metres (17,450 ft), leading to a topographic prominence of 731 metres (2,398 ft). Its parent peak is Ojos del Salado and the topographic isolation is 302.2 kilometres (187.8 mi).) composite volcano consisting of a central cone and several lava domes; it is the most voluminous conical volcano of the Central Volcanic Zone and one of the highest edifices there, rising more than 2 kilometres (1.2 mi) above the surrounding terrain. Several dacitic lava flows form the summit area of the volcano, the youngest of which originates from a summit dome. This summit dome is capped off by a summit crater at an altitude of 5,850 metres (19,190 ft), and four other craters occur northeast of the summit at altitudes of 5,600 to 5,800 metres (18,400 to 19,000 ft). Northwest of the summit, a dacitic lava dome is the source of a 500-metre-high (1,600 ft) talus slope. The summit area is surrounded by an inwards-dropping scarp that opens to the northwest and whose southern margin is buried by lava flows. Pyroclastic flows crop out beneath lava flows in the northwestern segment of the volcano, within the scarp. On the southern and eastern side there are 5 kilometres (3.1 mi) long 200–400 metres (660–1,310 ft) high cliffs; the southern scarp is about 9 kilometres (5.6 mi) long in total. A large wedge-shaped scar is recognizable on the northwestern flank, delimited by prominent scarps running through the western and northern flanks of the edifice. The existence of a lake in the summit area within the scarps at an elevation of 5,300 metres (17,400 ft) has been reported.

A pumice deposit is visible on the northeastern flank. Lava domes of various shapes are recognizable on the southern and western slopes; lava flows appear mainly on the eastern and northern slopes. The whole edifice has a diameter of 16 kilometres (9.9 mi) and, like many Central Andes volcanoes, is probably made up of lava domes, lava flows and pyroclastic formations. Its volume is about 102 cubic kilometres (24 cu mi), making Socompa one of the largest stratovolcanoes with Quaternary activity. The volcano apparently developed within a northwest-striking valley, the southern part of which now contains Laguna Socompa. This lake lies at an elevation of 3,400 metres (11,200 ft); to the north the volcano is bordered by the 3,200 metres (10,500 ft) high Monturaqui basin. The water table is at depths of 100–200 metres (330–660 ft), but surface runoff is only ephemeral. Magnetotelluric investigation has identified a structure at 2–7 kilometres (1.2–4.3 mi) depth which may be Socompa's magma chamber.

=== Sector collapse ===
Socompa suffered a major sector collapse during the Holocene, forming one of its largest terrestrial deposits. The deposit left by the collapse was first discovered on aerial photography in 1978 but it was correctly identified as a landslide in 1985; at first, it was interpreted as a form of moraine, then as a large pyroclastic flow and the scar as a caldera. Traces of such events are widespread on Central Andean volcanoes; Socompa's is the largest in the region and one of the better studied.

The event removed a 70° sector (about 9 kilometres (5.6 mi) of circumference and 7.5 kilometres (4.7 mi) of radius) on Socompa's northwestern side. The landslide descended over a vertical distance of about 3,000 metres (9,800 ft) and spread over distances of over 40 kilometres (25 mi), at a modelled speed of c. 100 metres per second (220 mph). As it descended, the landslide had sufficient energy that it was able to override topographic obstacles and climb over an elevation of about 250 metres (820 ft); secondary landslides occurred on the principal deposit and there is evidence that the landslide was reflected back from its margins. The event occurred in several steps, the first parts to fail ending up at the largest distances from the volcano; it is not established whether the collapse happened in a single event or as several separate failures.

The total volume of material removed was about 19.2 cubic kilometres (4.6 cu mi), which was dilated as it flowed and eventually ended up as a deposit with a volume of 25.7 cubic kilometres (6.2 cu mi); thorough mixing of the avalanche material occurred as the landslide progressed. The summit of the volcano was cut by the collapse and some lava domes embedded within the volcano were exposed in the rim of the collapse amphitheatre; before the collapse the volcano was about 6,300 metres (20,700 ft) high.

The collapse left a triangle-shaped collapse scar partly filled by leftover blocks. The walls of the amphitheatre were about 2,000 metres (6,600 ft) high, so high that secondary landslides occurred. The largest of these detached from a dome northwest of the summit and descended a horizontal distance of 6 kilometres (3.7 mi), forming a landslide structure notable in its own right and covering about 12 square kilometres (4.6 sq mi). The central section of the collapse amphitheatre was not a simple collapse structure, but instead contained a secondary scarp. At the mouth of the collapse scar, the walls were lower, about 300 metres (980 ft). After the principal collapse, lava flows and pyroclastic flows – some of which emerge from the western rim of the collapse scar – filled up the scar left by the collapse. A structure in the scar, named Domo del Núcleo, might either be a remnant of the pre-collapse volcano, or collapse debris.

The collapse happened about 6180+280
−640 years ago and is estimated to have lasted around 12 minutes, based on simulations. The growth rate of the volcano increased, in the aftermath probably due to the mass removal unloading the magmatic system. A similar collapse took place in the 1980 eruption of Mount St. Helens. Identification of the Socompa deposit as a landslide remnant was made after the occurrence of the large landslide at Mount St. Helens drew more attention to such events. Other volcanoes have suffered from large-scale collapses as well; this includes Aucanquilcha, Lastarria and Llullaillaco. In the case of Socompa, the occurrence of the collapse was probably influenced by a northwest tilt of the basement the volcano was constructed on; it caused the volcano to slide downward in its northwestern sector and made it prone to a collapse in that direction.

The precise circumstances leading to the collapse are unknown, although there are several hypotheses. There is evidence in the deposit that a lava flow was being erupted on the volcano when the landslide occurred, which together with the presence of pyroclastic fallout on the southwestern side of Socompa implies the event may have been started by volcanic activity. The quantity of water in the edifice rocks was probably minor. Another theory assumes that the volcanic edifice was destabilized by ductile and mechanically weak layers beneath Socompa; under the weight of the volcano these layers can deform and "flow" outward from the edifice, causing the formation of thrusts at its foot. Evidence of such spreading of the basement under Socompa has been found. Other potential causes are earthquakes and the intrusion of new magma. Climatic factors for the Socompa collapse, which have been proposed as triggers for other volcanoes, are speculative.

The event released a large amount of energy, about 380 petajoules (1.1×10^{11} kilowatt-hours). Some evidence in the form of tephra suggests that the collapse was accompanied by a lateral blast, but other research found no such evidence. Such events are classified as catastrophic phenomena, and the debris avalanches associated with them can reach large distances from the original volcano. The fragmentation of rocks during the landslide and the fine material generated during this process might enhance the fluidity of the avalanche, allowing it to spread far away from the source.

==== Landslide deposit ====
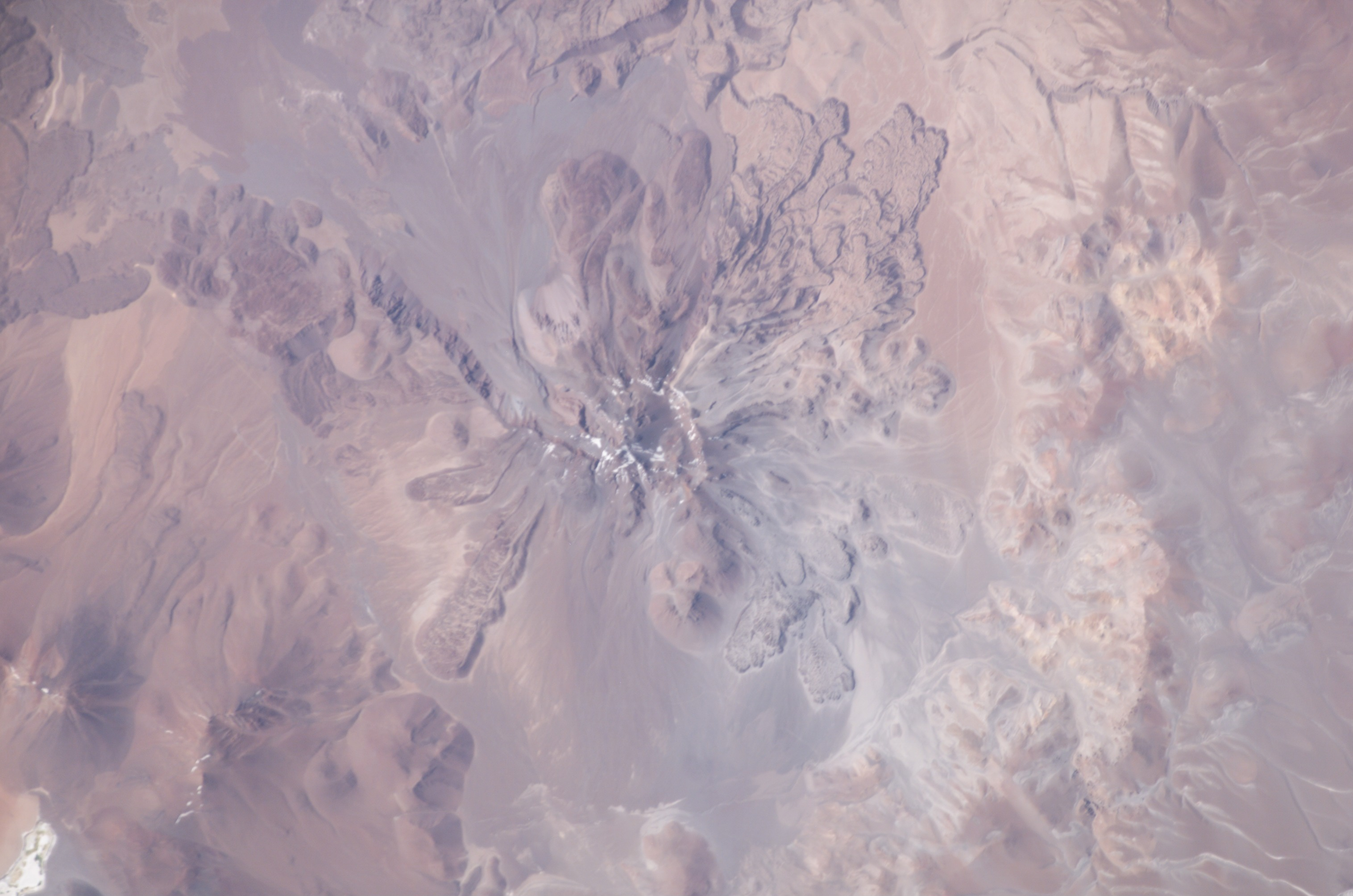
Socompa from space. The sector collapse deposit lies on the upper part of the image.

The collapse deposit covers a surface area of 490 square kilometres (190 sq mi), and is thus not as large as the deposit left by the Mount Shasta or Nevado de Colima collapses. The deposit forms the Negros de Aras (also a name for the deposit) surface northwest of the volcano and the El Cenizal surface due north, where it has a hook-like surface distribution. The thickness of the deposit varies, with thin segments in the extreme southeastern and southwestern parts being less than 10 metres (33 ft) thick and the central parts reaching 90 metres (300 ft).

The deposit spreads to a maximum width of 20 kilometres (12 mi) and is bounded by levees higher than 40 metres (130 ft), which are less prominent on the eastern side. As later parts of the collapse overrode the earlier segments, they formed a northeast-trending scarp in the deposit, across which there is a striking difference in its surface morphology. The landslide deposit has been stratigraphically subdivided into two units, the Monturaqui unit and the El Cenizal unit. The first unit forms most of the surface and consists of several subunits, one of which includes basement rocks that were integrated as it occurred. Likewise, the El Cenizal unit entrained basement rocks such as playa deposits. The amount of basement material is noticeably large and might form as much as 80% of the landslide volume; the topography of the northwestern side of the volcano may have prevented the mass failure from being localized along the basement-edifice surface area, explaining the large volume of basement involved. Further, the basement-derived material was probably mechanically weak and thus allowed the landslide to move over shallow slopes. This basement material forms part of the white surfaces in the landslide deposit; other bright areas are formed by fumarolically altered material. The basement material was originally considered to be pumice.

The landslide deposit contains large blocks, so called toreva blocks, which were torn from the mountain and came to a standstill unmodified, forming ridges up to several hundred metres high; the largest such blocks are 2.5 kilometres (1.6 mi) long and 1 kilometre (0.62 mi) wide, and their total volume is about 11 cubic kilometres (2.6 cu mi). These blocks form an almost closed semicircle at the mouth of the collapse amphitheatre and in part retain the previous stratigraphy of the volcano. Such toreva blocks are far more frequent in submarine landslides than subaerial ones and their occurrence at Socompa may reflect the relatively non-explosive nature of the collapse and material properties of the collapsed mass. Aside from the toreva blocks, individual blocks with sizes of up to 25 metres (82 ft) occur in the deposit and form large boulder fields. As well as the blocks, the surface of the landslide deposit contains hummock-like hills and small topographic depressions. Part of the landslide deposit was later covered by pyroclastic flows, and this covered area is known as the Campo Amarillo. As it descended, the landslide deposit filled a shallow valley that previously existed northwest of the volcano, as well as a larger northeast-striking depression. A lava flow was rafted on the avalanche to the El Cenizal area and ended up there almost unmodified.

The collapse deposit is well-preserved by the arid climate, among the best-preserved such deposits in the world. Owing to its sheer size, its structure and stratigraphy were only appreciated with the help of remote sensing. Pleistocene lava flows and a northwest-striking drainage were buried by the landslide but can still be discerned from aerial imagery; apart from these and some hills most of the area covered by the landslide was relatively flat. At La Flexura, part of the basement beneath the avalanche crops out from the ground.

== Geology ==
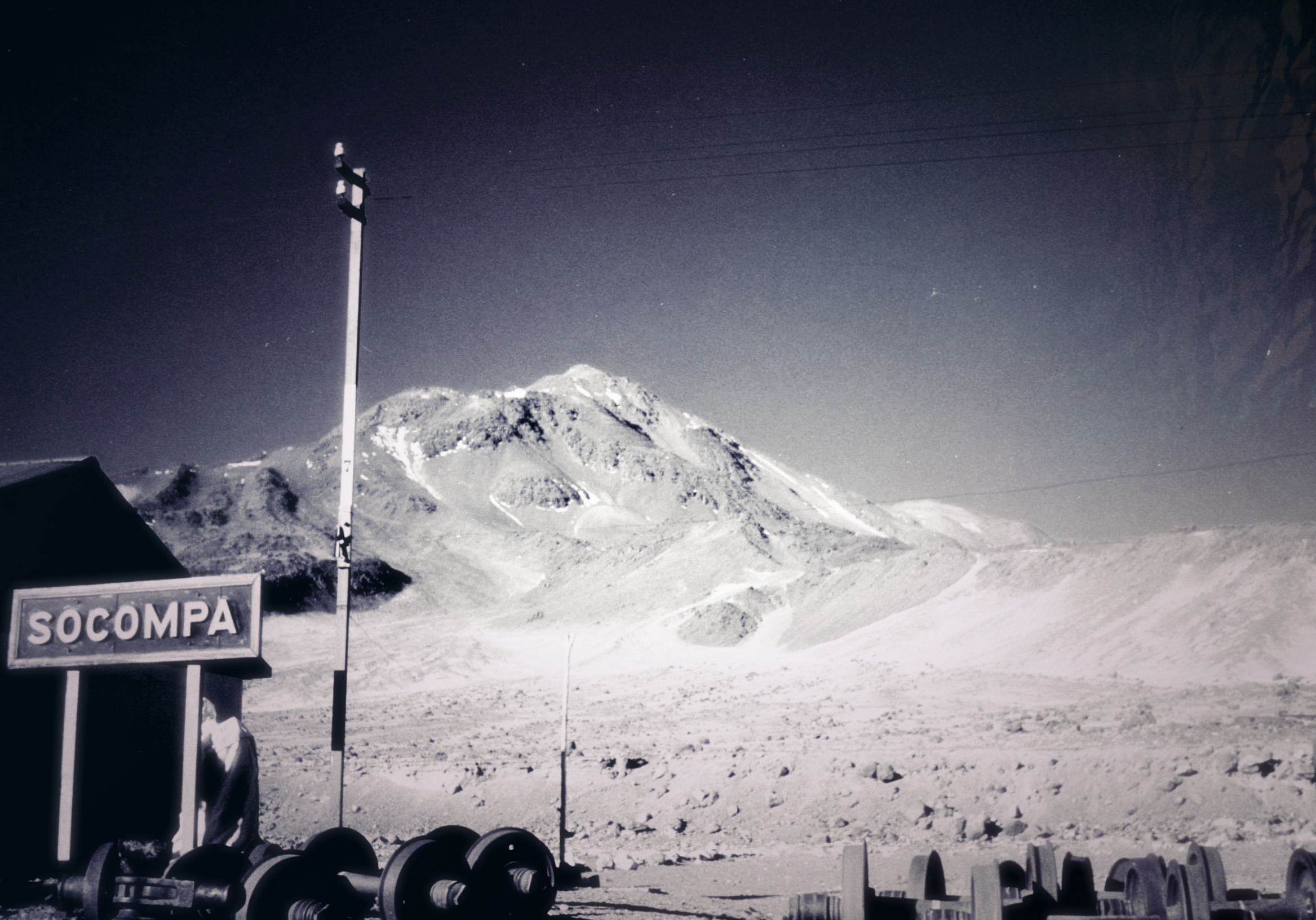
Socompa as seen from the nearby railway station Socompa

=== Regional ===
The volcanism in the Central Volcanic Zone of the Andes results from the subduction of the Nazca Plate beneath the South America Plate in the Peru-Chile Trench at a rate of 7–9 centimetres per year (2.8–3.5 in/year). Volcanism does not occur across the entire length of the trench, where the slab is subducting beneath the South America Plate at a shallow angle there is no recent volcanic activity.

The style of subduction has changed over time. About 27 million years ago, the Farallon Plate had been subducting beneath South America but broke up and the pace of subduction increased, leading to greater levels of volcanism. Around the same epoch, after the Eocene, the subduction angle increased beneath the Altiplano and caused the development of this plateau either from magmatic underplating and/or from crustal shortening; eventually the crust there became much thicker.

=== Local ===
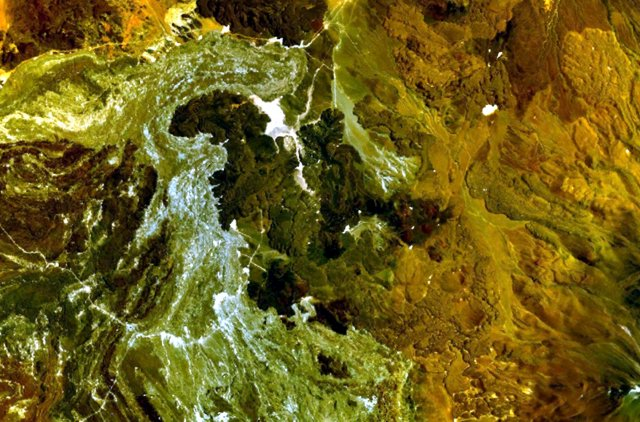
El Negrillar volcano just north of Socompa. The white area to the right is part of the Socompa landslide deposit.

Socompa forms a northeast-trending alignment with neighbouring volcanoes such as Pular and Pajonales, which reach elevations of about 6,000 metres (20,000 ft); Socompa is their youngest member. The presence of two calderas southeast and east of Socompa has been inferred. Monogenetic volcanoes were active in the area as well during the Pliocene and Quaternary and generated lava flows. One of these centres is El Negrillar just north of the collapse deposit, which was active during the Pleistocene and issued andesite-basaltic andesite lavas unlike the eruption products of Socompa itself.

A 200-kilometre-long (120 mi) elongated geologic structure (a lineament) known as the Socompa Lineament is associated with the volcano. Other volcanoes such as Cordon de Puntas Negras and the rim of the large La Pacana caldera farther north are also influenced by this lineament. A north-south trending lineament called the Llullaillaco Lineament is also linked to Socompa and to the Mellado volcano farther south.

To the west Socompa is bordered by the Sierra de Alameida (or Almeida), which farther north merges into the Cordon de Lila. To the east the 6,000-metre (20,000 ft) high Salín volcano neighbours Socompa; other volcanoes in the area are the 5,340-metre-high (17,520 ft) Cerro Bayo and the 5,200-metre-high (17,100 ft) Socompa Cairis, (Note: Also spelled Socompa Caipe or Caipis. Caipi in Quechua means "here".) all of which show evidence of glacial activity unlike the younger Socompa.

=== Basement ===
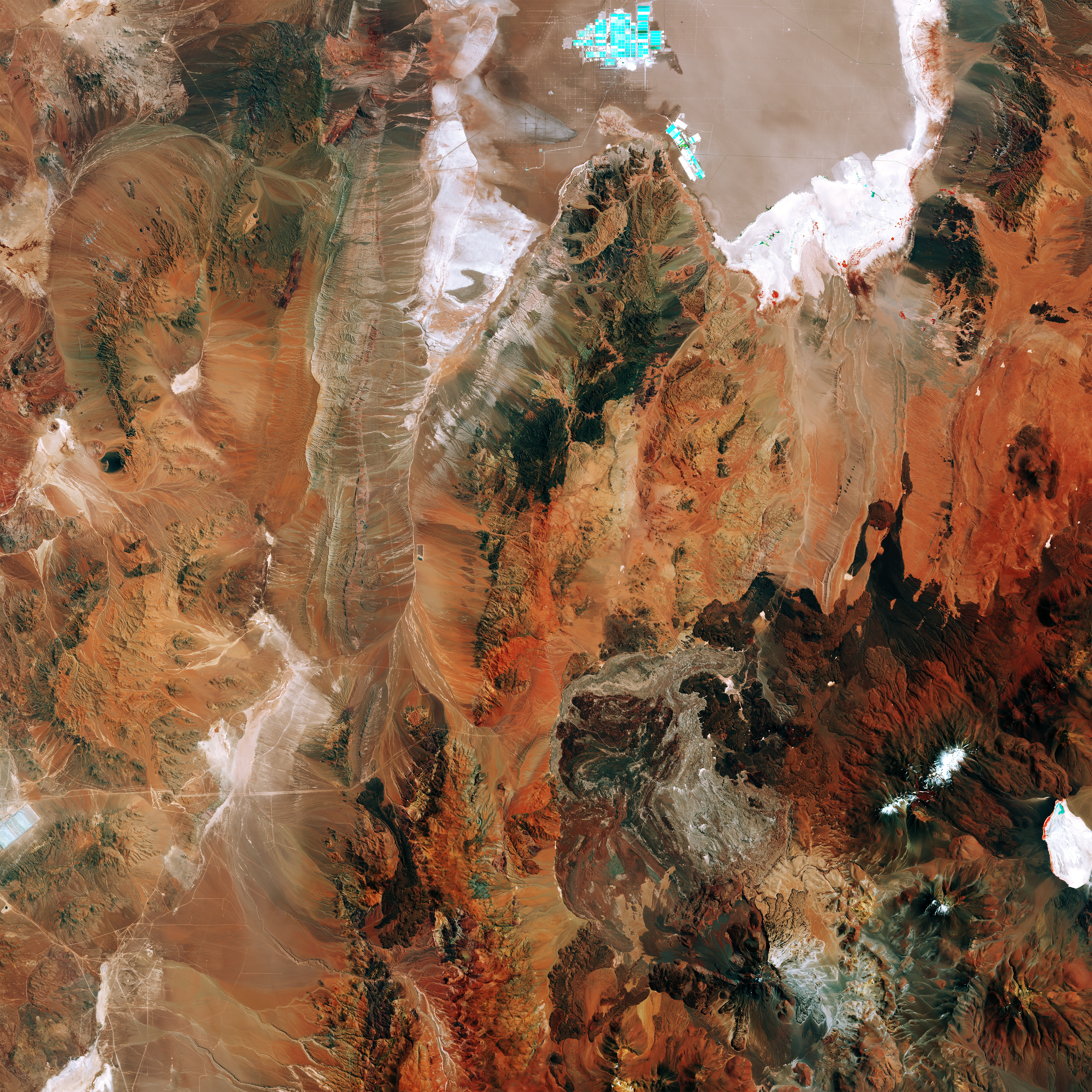
A spaceborne image of the region northwest of Socompa, which is recognizable in the lower right corner

The basement at Socompa is formed by Paleozoic and Mesozoic formations and by Quaternary sedimentary and volcanic rocks. The former crop out in the Sierra de Alameida and Alto del Inca west of Socompa and the latter as the 250-metre-thick (820 ft) Quebrada Salin Beds east of the volcano. Part of these beds were taken up into the avalanche as it collapsed and form the Flexura inliner, others appear in the Loma del Inca area north and the Monturaqui area due west of Socompa. The basement rocks are subdivided into three named formations, the Purilactis Formation of Paleozoic–Mesozoic age, the San Pedro and Tambores formations of Oligocene–Miocene age and the Miocene–Pliocene Salin formation; part of the latter formation may have been erupted by Socompa itself. The volcano is at the point where the Sierra de Alameida meets the Puna block.

During the Pliocene this basement was covered by the Arenosa and Tucucaro ignimbrites (2.5 and 3.2 million years ago by potassium–argon dating, respectively) which also crop out west of Socompa; Socompa is probably constructed on top of these ignimbrites. The Arenosa ignimbrite is about 30 metres (98 ft) thick, and the Tucucaro reaches a thickness of 5 metres (16 ft).

Some normal faults appear in the area north of Socompa and appear to run through the edifice. Although they are not visible in the edifice itself, Socompa was uplifted on its southeastern side by the fault motion. This might have aided in the onset of edifice instability and the collapse event. Directly north-northwest of Socompa lie three anticlines (Note: An anticline is a rock formation which has been folded upwards, with the sides dipping away from the top ridge.) probably formed under the influence of the mass of both Socompa and Pajonales: The Loma del Inca, Loma Alta and La Flexura.

=== Composition ===
Socompa has erupted andesite and dacite, with dacite dominating. Phenocrysts found in the rocks of the avalanche include the minerals augite, hornblende, hypersthene, magnetite and plagioclase; dacites also contain biotite, and andesites also contain olivine. In the summit area, hydrothermal alteration took place, and clay, silt and sulphur bearing rocks are also found.

== Climate and ecology ==
There are few data on climate at Socompa. The area is windy and dry given that the volcano lies in the Desert Puna, with frequent snow cover, there are penitentes but no glaciers. The low cloud cover means that insolation is high. Weather data collected in 1991 found an average temperature of −5.5 °C (22.1 °F), a large diurnal air temperature cycle (and a larger soil temperature cycle of c. 60 to −10 °C (140 to 14 °F)) and low evaporation. The present-day precipitation has been estimated to be 400 millimetres per year (16 in/year), with other estimates assuming less than 200 millimetres per year (7.9 in/year). Periglacial landforms indicate that in the past the area was wetter, possibly thanks to the Little Ice Age. The last ice age in the region ended 12,000-10,000 years ago; there is no evidence for Pleistocene glaciation on Socompa, including no cirques, which may be due to the volcano's young age.

Socompa features autotrophic communities associated with fumaroles and thermal anomalies at high altitude, between 5,750–6,050 metres (18,860–19,850 ft) of elevation. The autotrophic communities on Socompa are the highest known in the world, and they occur both on the actual fumaroles, on "cold fumaroles" and at a few metres from the vents. The different species are often extremophiles since the environment on Socompa is harsh, and the communities also include heterotrophic species. Such heterotrophs include ascomycota and basidiomycota, the latter of which are similar to Antarctic basidiomycota.

The fumaroles on Socompa also feature stands of bryophytes such as liverworts and mosses (Note: The moss Globulinella halloyi was discovered on Socompa.) as well as lichens and algae, and animals have been found in the stands. These stands are among the highest in the world and cover noticeably large surface areas despite their elevation, and are fairly remote from other plant life in the region. There is a noticeable diversity between separate stands, and the vegetation is quite dissimilar to the vegetation in the surroundings but resembles that found in the paramo and cloud forests in South America and the subantarctic islands. A sparse vegetation cover is also found on the lower slopes of Socompa. Short-tailed chinchillas, black-headed lizards and its relative Liolaemus porosus live on its slopes, and mice have been observed in the summit area.

== Eruptive history ==
Activity at Socompa commenced with the extrusion of andesites, which were followed later by dacites. Several Plinian eruptions have occurred from Socompa; one Holocene eruption reached a volcanic explosivity index of 5. Several dates have been obtained on rocks, including 2,000,000 ± 1,000,000, 1,300,000 ± 500,000, 800,000 ± 300,000, and less than 500,000 years ago. An age of 3,340,000 ± 600,000 years may be of an older volcano, now buried beneath the Socompa edifice. Lava domes and lava flows on the southern side of the volcano have yielded ages of 69,200 ± 6,000, 31,400 ± 3,200, 29,800 ± 3,300 and 22,100 ± 1,900 years ago. An eruption 7,220 ± 100 years before present produced the El Túnel pyroclastic deposit on the western side of Socompa. After the sector collapse 7,200 years ago, activity continued filling the collapse scar. The explosion craters on the summit are the youngest volcanic landforms on Socompa. One dome in the scar has been dated to 5,910 ± 430 years ago; the Global Volcanism Program gives 5,250 BCE as the date of the last eruption. (Note: A different source gives 5,250 years before present, but it refers to the Global Volcanism Program entry which mentions 5250 BCE rather than 5250 BP.)

The absence of moraines on Socompa suggests that volcanic activity occurred during post-glacial time. The volcano also has a young appearance, similar to historically active Andean volcanoes such as San Pedro, implying recent volcanic activity.

There is no evidence for historical activity at Socompa and the volcano is not considered an active volcano, but both fumarolic activity and the emission of carbon dioxide have been observed. The fumarolic activity occurs at at least six sites and is relatively weak; anecdotal reports indicate a smell of sulphur on the summit. Uplift of the edifice began in November 2019 and was ongoing as of October 2021, and could be caused by the arrival of new magma. As of 2023 there is no ground-based monitoring of the volcano.

Socompa is considered to be a high-risk volcano; a 2021 survey labelled it Argentina's 13th most dangerous volcano out of 38. The area is only thinly populated, and apart from the Socompa railway station and mining camps west of the volcano, there is little infrastructure that could be impacted by future eruptions. Large explosive eruptions during summer may result in pyroclastic fallout west of the volcano; during the other seasons fallout would be concentrated east of it.

Groundwater is warmer and richer in carbon dioxide the closer to Socompa it is pumped, also suggesting that volcanic gas fluxes still occur at the volcano and that the volcano influences groundwater systems. Hot springs are found at Laguna Socompa as well. In 2011, the copper mining company Minera Escondida was considering building a geothermal power plant on Socompa to supply energy; the Argentine Servicio Geológico Minero agency started exploration work in January 2018 for geothermal power production.
