= La Negrillar =

Volcanic cone and associated lava flow in Chile

- Aguas Perdidas
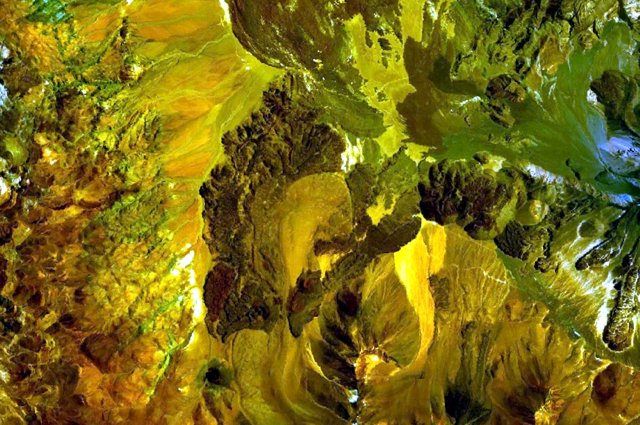
- The lava flow just left of centre forms the La Negrillar cone and lava flow

Highest point
- Elevation: 4,109 m (13,481 ft)
- Coordinates: 24.28°S 68.6°W

Geography

La Negrillar is a volcanic cone and associated lava flow in Chile. It covers 16 square kilometres (6.2 sq mi) on the southwestern margin of the Atacama basin. It erupted basalts and andesite and its flows and cones are well preserved. Radiometric dating has yielded ages of 1.4 ± 0.5 and 0.54 ± 0.5 million years. It is one of several mafic centres in the region located along fault systems.
