= Tilocálar =

Volcanoes in Salar de Atacama, Chile

- Location within Chile

Highest point
- Elevation: 3,109 m (10,200 ft)
- Coordinates: 23.97°S 68.13°W

Tilocálar is a group of volcanoes south of the Salar de Atacama, in Chile. It developed during the Pleistocene and consists of a small lava dome, two vents with numerous thick lava flows that reach lengths of several kilometres, and an explosion crater that was mistaken for an impact crater in the past. There are similar volcanoes nearby.

== Geography and geomorphology ==
Tilocálar (Note: The string Tilo is of Atacameno language origin.) is located south of the Salar de Atacama, within the Central Volcanic Zone of the Andes at an elevation of approximately 3,167 metres (10,390 ft). It is a group of small volcanoes: (Note: Variously given as four or two individual volcanoes, about 3.5 kilometres (2.2 mi) apart.)

- The southern vent (Tilocálar Sur) is the larger. It produced six or four lava flows with a total volume of about 0.24 cubic kilometres (0.058 cu mi). Pyroclastic deposits cover an area of 3.3 square kilometres (1.3 sq mi), forming a roughly circular area where the lava flows were emplaced. It has three volcanic craters aligned on a graben and the lava flows probably emanated from a lava lake.
- The northern vent of Tilocálar produced only one 4.3-kilometre (2.7 mi) long flow, which covers an area of about 3.5 square kilometres (1.4 sq mi) and consists of three separate geologic units.
- A small lava dome is situated southwest of Tilocálar north and is called El Maní; it resembles a pile of rocks.
- An explosion crater lies 1 kilometre (0.62 mi) south of Tilocálar Sur and has also been described as a maar. This crater has a diameter of 400–300 metres (1,310–980 ft) and a depth of 50 metres (160 ft), and bears traces of having been filled with water in the past. It was discovered in 1976 during field work and originally was interpreted to be an impact crater, but does not have the properties of one.

The lava flows emanating from Tilocálar are 50–80 metres (160–260 ft) thick and blocky. A dyke swarm is associated with the vents. The Tilocálar volcanoes are situated within a geographical depression associated with numerous north–south trending ridges; the volcanism at Tilocálar is geographically linked to these ridges. Other volcanoes such as Cerro Tujle and Negro de Aras are in the vicinity.

== Geology ==
The volcanoes developed on ignimbrites of Pliocene age, which are alternatively identified as the Talabre or the Tucucaro ignimbrite; the latter is 3.2±0.3 million years old. The region is subject to compressional tectonic forces, and a Plio-Pleistocene north-south trending fault system played a role in the development of the volcano. Magnetotelluric analysis has identified electrically conductive structures underneath Tujle and Tilocálar, which may either by hydrothermally altered rocks or partial melt left over from past magmatic processes.

Between Bolivia, Chile and Argentina, an area of volcanoes exceeding 50,000 square kilometres (19,000 sq mi) constitutes the Altiplano-Puna volcanic complex. These volcanoes were active during the last 26 million years in distinct pulses, most recently one million years ago at Apacheta-Aguilucho volcanic complex, El Tatio and Purico. The pulses are characterized by the emission of ignimbrites and the formation of calderas. These volcanic units are silicic, but more mafic volcanic units were also emplaced in the region in the form of monogenetic volcanoes such as Tilocálar.

=== Composition ===
Lava flows have an andesitic to dacitic and the lava dome a dacitic to rhyolitic composition, and define a potassium-rich calc-alkaline chemical pattern with clinopyroxene, iron-titanium oxides, olivine, orthopyroxene, plagioclase and pyroxene phenocrysts. (Note: Phenocrysts are large crystals embedded in volcanic rocks.) There are noticeable differences in the composition of the northern and southern Tilocálar lavas. A delaminated lower crust may have contributed to the formation of the Tilocálar magmas. Andesitic magmas in the region may have formed when basaltic magmas became trapped in fault systems and underwent crystal fractionation processes before reaching the surface and generating the monogenetic volcanoes.

== Eruptive history ==
The volcanoes were active during the Quaternary, Pleistocene-Holocene or in the last 900,000 years. Dating has yielded ages of less than one million years, and argon–argon dating on Tilocálar Sur has produced ages of 730,000±500,000 and 460,000±50,000 years. There are no known historical eruptions and has not been assigned a hazard score; potential impacts of renewed activity on populations are considered to be minimal.

North Tilocálar formed during a single eruption, while Tilocálar Sur was constructed during multiple eruptions. Presumably an initial explosive eruption emplaced the pyroclastics, which were then in part overrun by the lava flows. The event had a volcanic explosivity index of 3–4. The explosion crater was probably formed through a steam or gas explosion when the conduit of Tilocálar Sur was breached and interacted with a regional confined groundwater body.

== Other ==
Tilocalar is also the name of an archeological site farther north, at the southern margin of the Salar de Atacama, and of an archeological phase named after that area.
