= Cerro Tujle =

Chilean geographical feature

- Cerro Tucle, Cerro Tugle
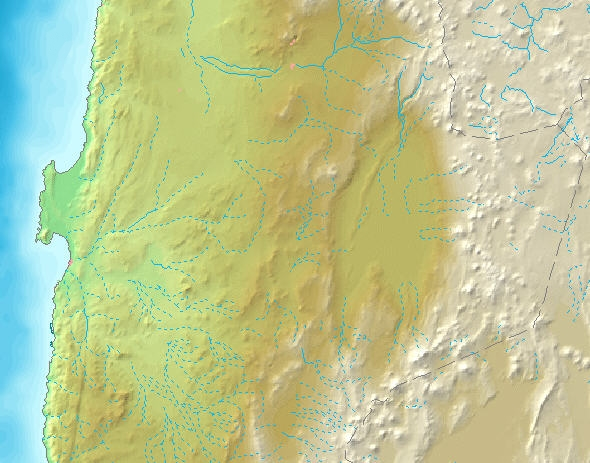
- Location within Región de Antofagasta

Highest point
- Elevation: 3,550 m (11,650 ft)
- Coordinates: 23.82°S 67.95°W

Geography
- Country: Chile
- Region: Antofagasta
- Parent range: Altiplano, Andes

Geology
- Orogeny: Andean
- Rock age: Holocene
- Mountain type: Maar
- Volcanic belt: Central Volcanic Zone

Cerro Tujle (also known as Cerro Tucle or Cerro Tugle) is a mafic volcanic centre in the Central Volcanic Zone of the Andes, Chile. It forms a 60-metre-deep (200 ft) maar that may have formed half a million years ago. Its eruption products are aphyric. Previously in 1977, this crater has been identified as a meteor crater with diameters of 300 by 350 metres (980 ft × 1,150 ft).

The crater lies between the Salar de Atacama and the Western Cordillera at an elevation of 3,554 metres (11,660 ft) on the Cordón de Tujle ridge, 20 kilometres (12 mi) south-east of Peine. The crater is 333 metres (1,093 ft) wide, elliptical and surrounded by volcanic deposits. The crater appears to have formed, after an initial lava flow eruption turned phreatomagmatic. It is embedded in the Tucúcaro Ignimbrite, which overlies an Ordovician basement and Paleozoic-Mesozoic volcanic and Neozoic mixed sediments. There are other volcanic systems in the vicinity, forming an extended area of monogenetic volcanoes.

== See also ==
- Tilocálar
