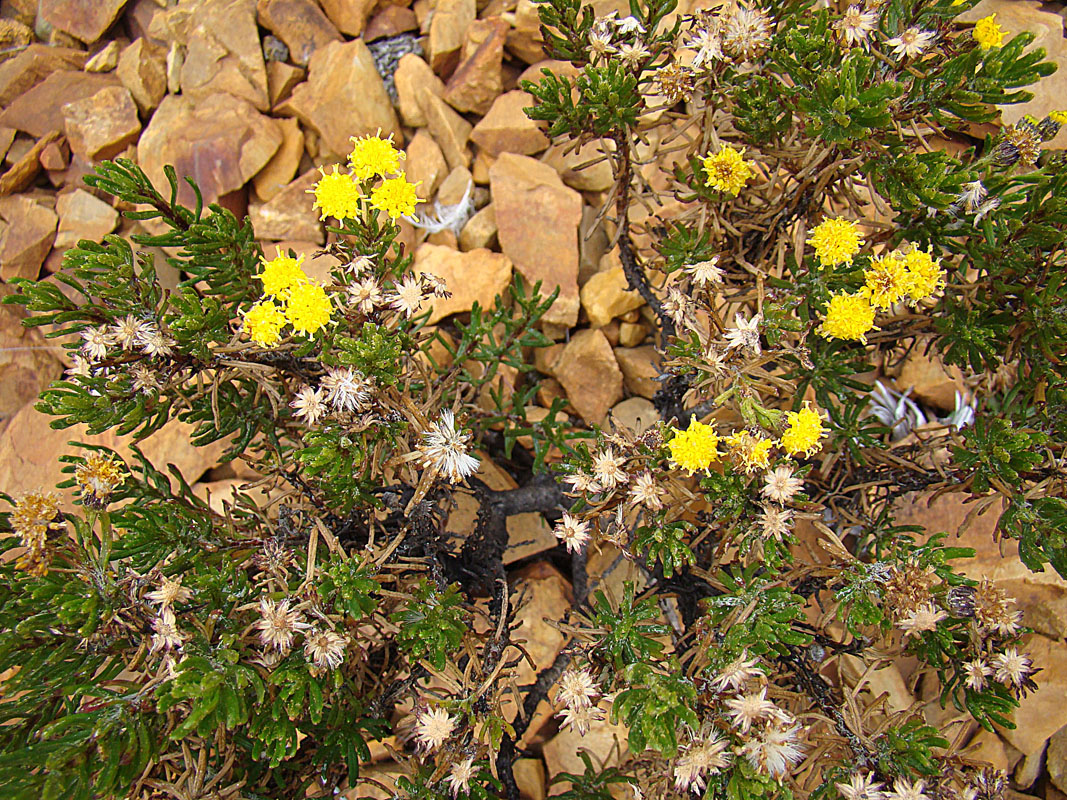
- Parastrephia sp.

Scientific classification
- Kingdom: Plantae
- Clade: Tracheophytes
- Clade: Angiosperms
- Clade: Eudicots
- Clade: Asterids
- Order: Asterales
- Family: Asteraceae
- Subfamily: Asteroideae
- Tribe: Astereae
- Subtribe: Baccharidinae
- Genus: Parastrephia; Nutt.

Type species
- Parastrephia ericoides (syn of P. lucida) Nutt.

Synonyms
- Polyclados Phil.

= Parastrephia =

Genus of flowering plants

Parastrephia is a genus of South American plants in the tribe Astereae within the family Asteraceae.

Some Parastrephia species are allegedly used in traditional medicine. For example, Parastrephia lucida is used in the highlands of the Andes to relieve toothache, for bone fractures and bruises, and as a vulnerary.

Species accepted by the Plants of the World Online as of December 2022:

- Parastrephia lepidophylla (Wedd.) Cabrera - Argentina, Bolivia
- Parastrephia lucida (Meyen) Cabrera - Peru, Bolivia, northern Chile, northwestern Argentina
- Parastrephia phyliciformis (Meyen) Cabrera - Bolivia
- Parastrephia quadrangularis (Meyen) Cabrera - Bolivia, northern Chile, northwestern Argentina
- Parastrephia teretiuscula (Kuntze) Cabrera - Bolivia, Antofagasta Region of northern Chile
