= Puna de Atacama =

High plateau in the Andes

Coordinates: 23°27′36″S 67°21′36″W

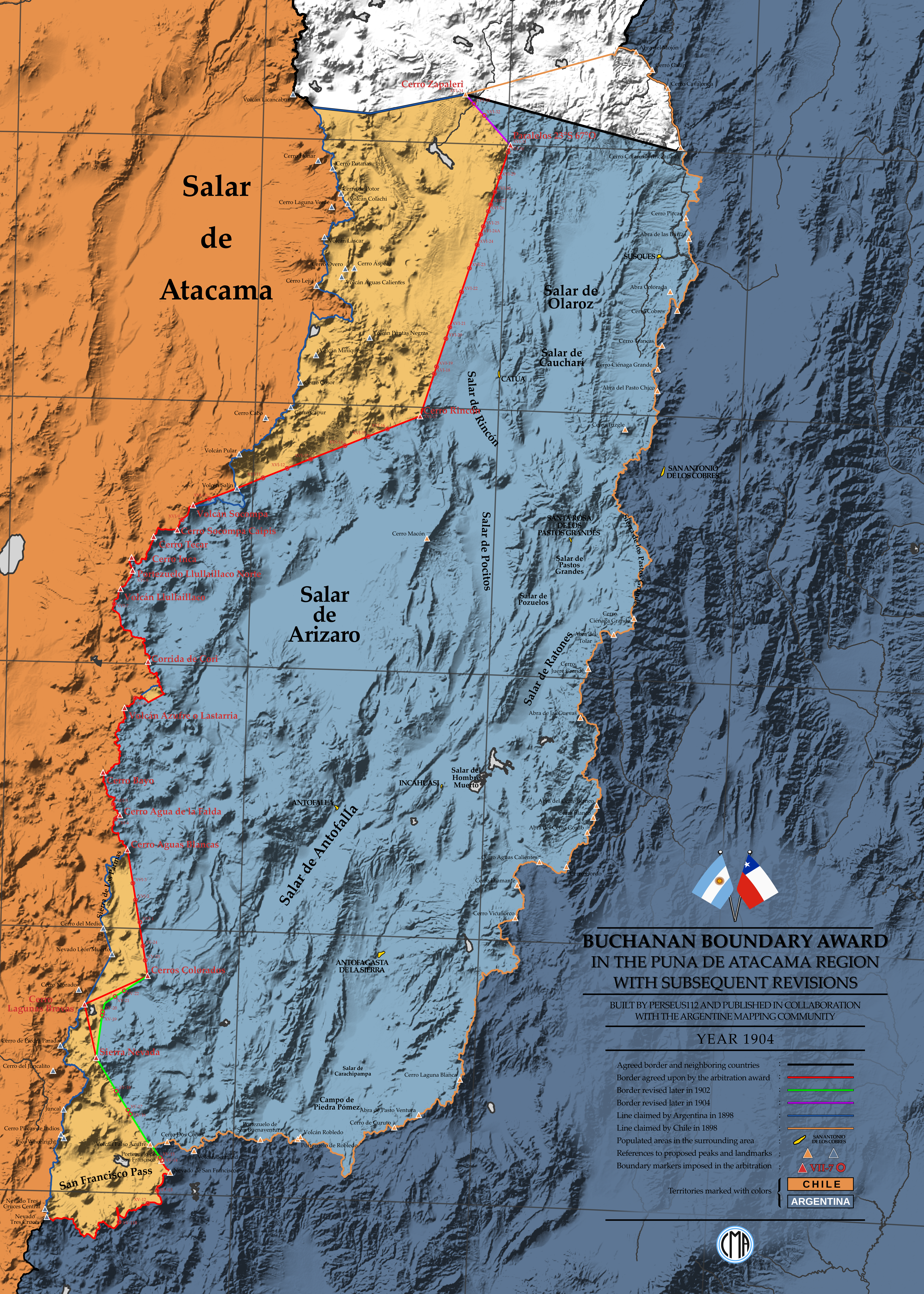
Map of the territories claimed by Argentina and Chile between 1898 and 1904 during the dispute over the Puna de Atacama.

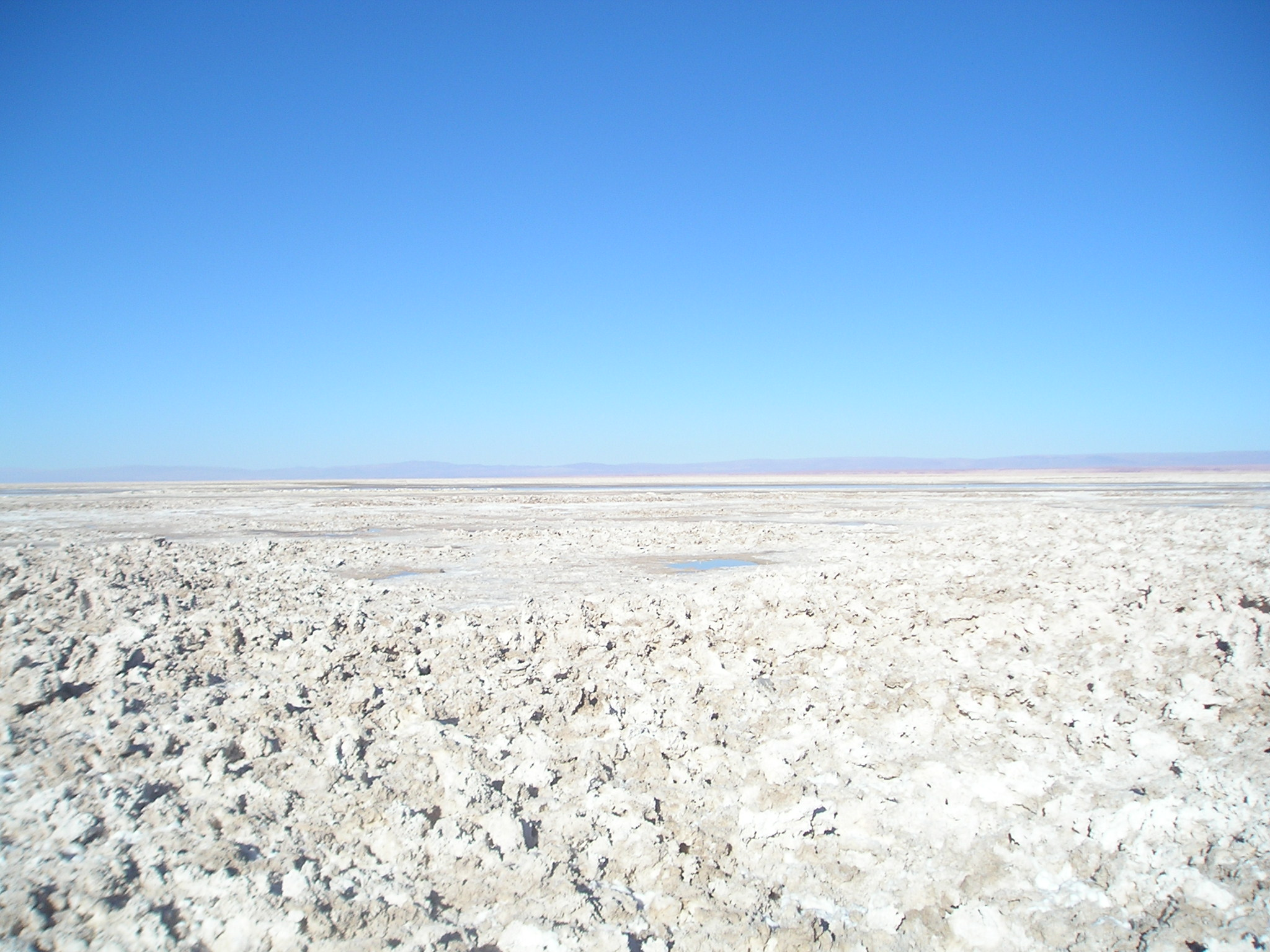
Salar de Atacama salt flat in the Chilean puna

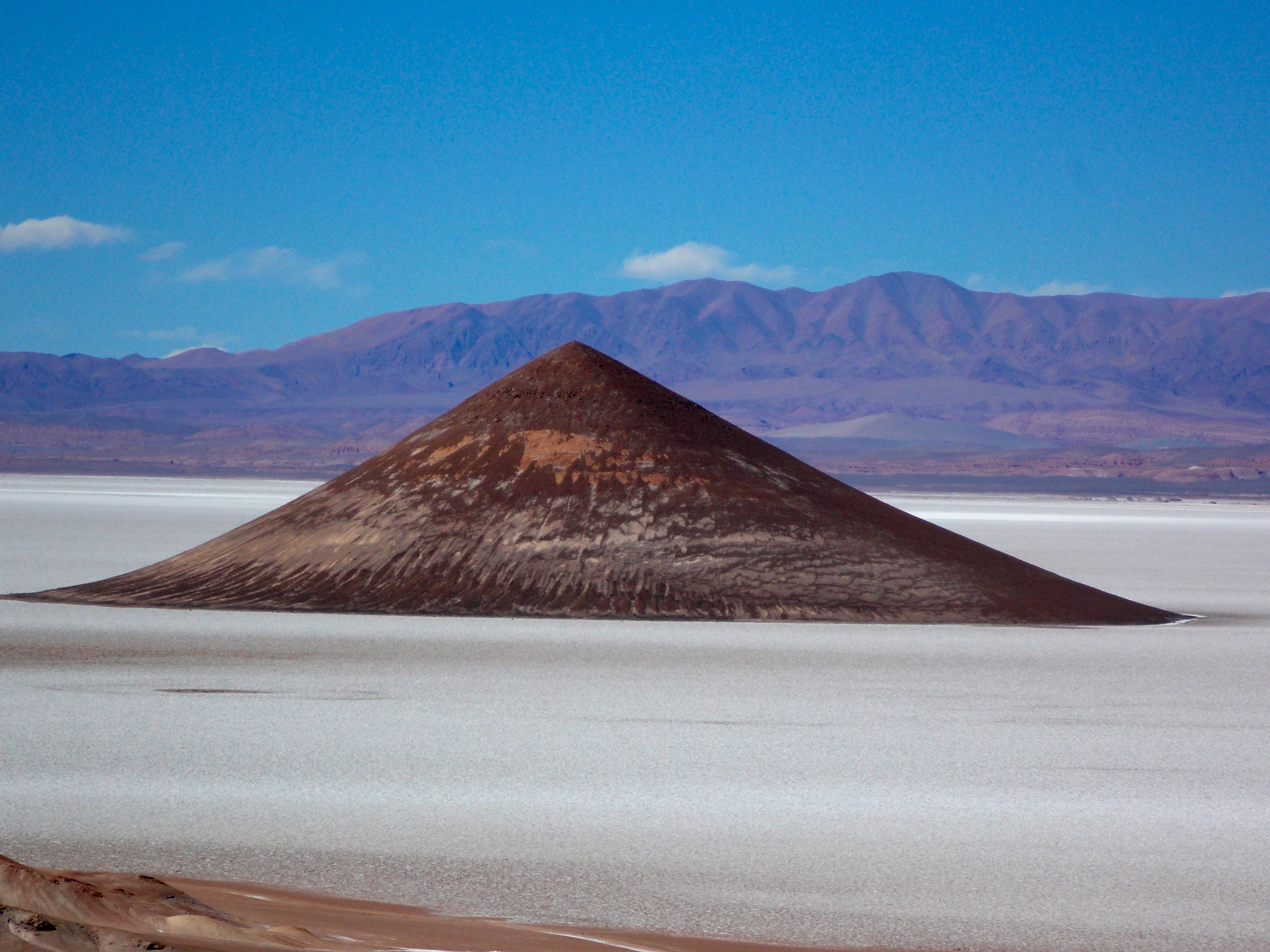
Cono de Arita, Salta (Argentina)

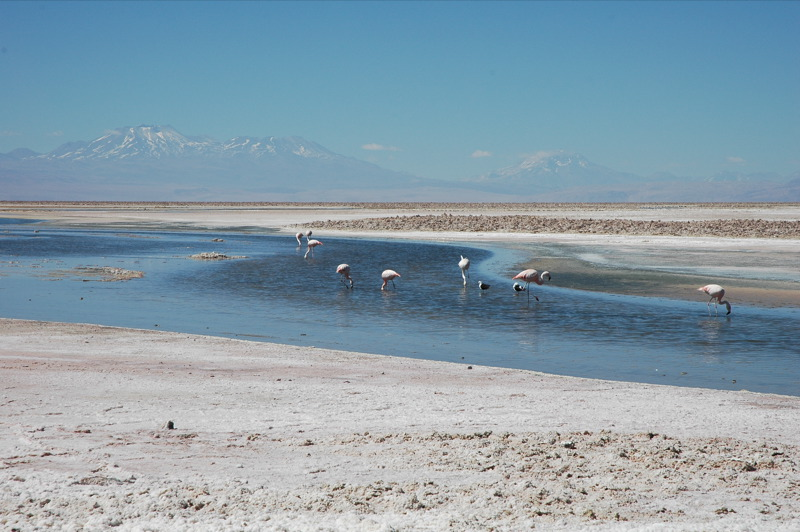
Salar de Atacama with the volcanoes Pular (L), Cerro Pajonales (center left) and Socompa (R) in the distance. The 1899 border runs through Socompa.

The Puna de Atacama or Atacama Plateau is an arid high plateau, in the Andes of northern Chile (15%) and northwest of Argentina (85%). Geomorphologist Walther Penck based his Grossfalt landform association on Puna de Atacama.

== Geography ==
The plateau's elevation averages 4,500 m (14,800 ft) above sea level, and it spans an area of 180,000 km^{2} (69,000 sq mi).

In Argentina, the Puna territory extends across the provinces of Salta, Jujuy, and western Catamarca. In Chile, it is located in the regions of Antofagasta and northeastern Atacama.

In December 2023, scientists, for the first time, reported a recently discovered area on the current planet Earth, particularly in the Puna's territory, which may be similar to ancient Earth, and the related environment of the first life forms on Earth, as well as similar to possibly hospitable conditions on the planet Mars during earlier Martian times.

== International borders ==
Before the War of the Pacific (1879–1883), the region belonged to Bolivia. In 1898, it was ceded to Argentina in exchange for recognition of Tarija as part of Bolivia. Chile, which had annexed the Litoral Province from Bolivia, declared the exchange illegal. The border was defined in 1899 following the Puna de Atacama dispute. Of the 75,000 km^{2} in dispute, 64,000 (85%) were awarded to Argentina and 11,000 (15%) to Chile.

== See also ==
- Atacama Desert
- Altiplano
- Altiplano–Puna volcanic complex
- Salar de Atacama
- Salar de Arizaro
- Puna grassland
- Tren a las Nubes
- Salta–Antofagasta railway
