= Tebenquicho =

Coordinates: 25°20′00″S 67°41′00″W

Tebenquicho is a volcano in Argentina.

The volcano is constructed by lava domes, lava flows and pyroclastic flows. Among its eruption products are potassium-rich dacites which show evidence of having interacted with the crust when they formed. The volcano was active between 14 and 6 million years ago; as volcanism waned mafic activity started up elsewhere in the Puna.

Tebenquicho together with other volcanoes such as Antofalla is a back-arc stratovolcano of the Puna. These volcanoes developed starting from 15-14 million years ago in response to a change in the subduction of the Nazca Plate beneath the South America Plate. These edifices are voluminous and volcanic activity on them long-lasting. Additionally, Tebenquicho together with Galan, Llullaillaco and some monogenetic volcanoes forms the so-called Archibarca volcano lineament.

The volcano has a mountain sanctuary.
