= Salar de Antofalla =

Salt flat in north-western Argentina

- Location within Argentina
- Location: Argentina
- Coordinates: 25.7333333°S 67.75°W
- Basin countries: Argentina
- Max. length: 136 km (85 mi)
- Max. width: 10 km (6.2 mi)
- Surface area: 500 km^{2} (193 sq mi)
- Surface elevation: 3,460 m (11,352 ft)

Salar de Antofalla is a salt flat in the Andes of Catamarca Province in the Argentine Northwest. The salt flat contains systems of oncoids that grow in the interface between proper salt flat and an adjacent wetlands. The geology surrounding the southern part of Salar de Antofalla is made up of continental (e.i. non-marine) sedimentary rock that deposited from Late Eocene to Early Pleistocene times.
