= Pular (volcano) =

Stratovolcano in the Antofagasta Region of northern Chile

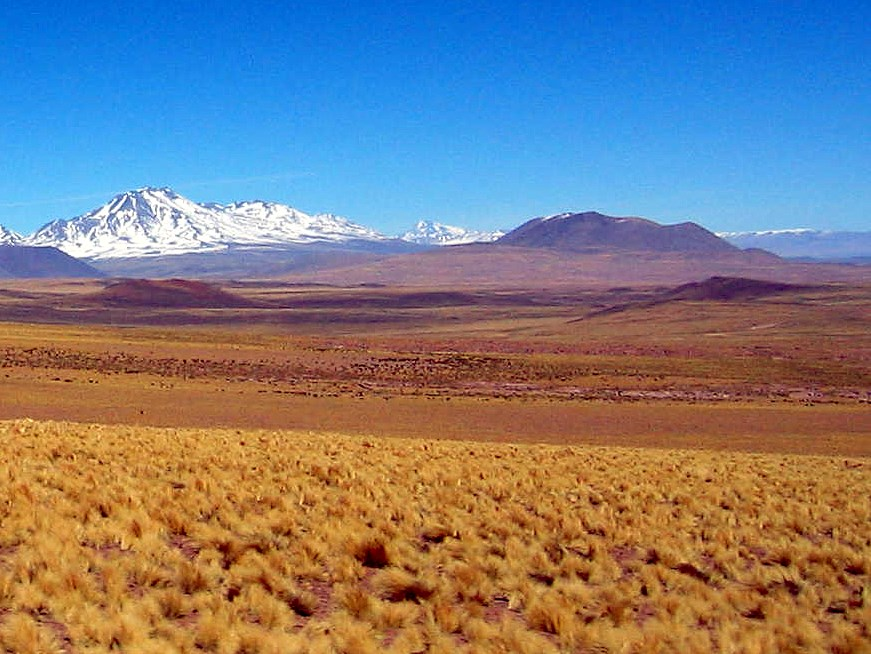
- Miñiques surrounding area with Pular, Cerro Pajonales and Socompa in the distance.

Highest point
- Elevation: 6,233 m (20,449 ft)
- Prominence: 1,898 m (6,227 ft)
- Listing: Ultra
- Coordinates: 24°11′15″S 68°03′15″W

Naming
- English translation: The Eyebrow
- Language of name: Kunza

Geography
- Location within Chile
- Location: Antofagasta Region, Chile
- Parent range: Andes

Geology
- Mountain type: Stratovolcanoes
- Last eruption: Unknown

Climbing
- First ascent: Inka, pre-Columbian

Pular is a volcanic massif in the northern Chilean Andes, in the Antofagasta Region north of Socompa volcano. It consists of the individual mountains Pajonales and Pular, which are among the highest mountains in the region and of great cultural importance to the neighbouring towns of Socaire and Peine. Pular and Pajonales have multiple volcanic craters and have produced lava domes. The mountains were active during the last three million years; whether there was any activity in historical times is unclear. The mountains are largely unglaciated in the present, owing to the dry climate, although groundwater originates on them. During the Last Glacial Maximum, glacial advances left a girdle of moraines around the massif.

== Name and human importance ==
In the Kunza language Pular means "The Eyebrow", and the name "Cordon Pular" refers to the entire Pular-Pajonales volcanic massif. Another name is "Palar" and the people of Peine call it "Tata Pilancho". An unrelated location named "Pular" lies in the Sierra de Almeida, on the other side of Monturaqui mining camp from the volcanic massif, and is famous for its bitumen.

Pular is in the Antofagasta Region, close to the frontier with Argentina. The Monturaqui mining camp and the station on the Salta-Antofagasta railway of the same name, which however are at some distance from each other, lie southwest from Pular. An old path between Chile and Argentina runs by the Salar de Pular salt flat. The mountain was used as a pasture site by the people from the Salar de Atacama.

The volcanic massif was a site of Inka cultural activity. They left firewood and built structures both on its slopes and on the summit, where a platform and a circular stone structure (pirca) is found. The mountain has cultural importance for the town of Peine and to a lesser measure Socaire, where the cemetery is constructed to point to the mountain. Pular is visible from Socaire, and from the summit of Antofalla volcano, the latter 220 kilometres (140 mi) away.

== Geology and geomorphology ==
Off the western coast of South America, the Nazca Plate subducts beneath the South American Plate. This process is responsible for the formation of the Andes mountain chain and the volcanic activity there. A number of volcanoes adorn the Central Andes, some of which reach 6,000 metres (20,000 ft) elevation. Closed basins with salt flats lie between the mountains.

Pular is situated about 50 kilometres (31 mi) south of the southeastern margin of the Salar de Atacama and just west-northwest of Salar de Pular. The Pajonales-Pular volcanic massif has a volume of about 245 cubic kilometres (59 cu mi), covers an area of 300 square kilometres (120 sq mi) on faulted Miocene sediments. The massif consists of a 12-kilometre (7.5 mi) long alignment of volcanoes south of the Cerros de Coransoque, between and including the northeasterly 6,233 metres (20,449 ft) high Pular and the 5,958 metres (19,547 ft) high southwesterly Pajonales. Another 5,732 metres (18,806 ft) high peak on the western side of the ridge also bears the name Pajonales. With their elevation, they are among the most prominent mountains of the Central Andes only behind Llullaillaco. The edifice is formed by lava flows and consists of two subunits, a heavily eroded unit that consists of Pajonales and Pular proper and a younger unit consisting of 800–1,000 metres (2,600–3,300 ft) high volcanic domes e.g. in the eastern portion of the system. There are numerous vents and more than nine craters, some with crater lakes including Laguna Pajonales. There is an outline of a sector collapse scar to the east, which may have produced a debris avalanche deposit south of Salar de Pular; alternatively the avalanche may have come from Aracar volcano. The volcanic massif have erupted andesitic and dacitic rocks, which in some areas suffered hydrothermal alteration. Around the volcanoes, older volcanic rocks of Miocene to Pliocene age crop out.

Other volcanoes in the area are Tanque to the east-northeast, Aracar across the Salar de Pular, Socompa to the southwest and Salin south of Pajonales-Pular and El Negrillar due west; there are many others. Pular-Pajonales and Socompa are connected by a ridge and possibly by a fault; their size may be a consequence of the subduction of the Taltal submarine ridge at this latitude. The Cordon de Lila ridge extends north from Pular towards the Salar de Atacama.

=== Eruption history and hazards ===
Most of the volcanic massif formed before the Holocene. Rocks of the older unit are 3.9 million years old, while one of the domes has been dated to be 1.8 million years old and another overlies a glacial moraine. The debris avalanche probably occurred during the Pleistocene. Pajonales is considered the younger of the two main volcanoes, and the Pajonales west of the ridge may be the youngest activity of the volcanic massif. There are reports of solfataric activity, thermal anomalies of 11 °C (20 °F) observed in satellite images may be due to sulfur deposits. Contradictory reports exist of an explosive eruption in 1990. The region is remote and renewed activity – which would most likely consist of lava and pyroclastic flows – is unlikely to have any impact: Chile's National Geology and Mining Service's hazard map shows no infrastructure in the danger area of Pular-Pajonales.

=== Climate and glaciation ===
The South Pacific Anticyclone is the dominant feature of regional climate and responsible for the aridity of the Central Andes. It deflects the westerlies winds to the south, while the tropical areas receive precipitation mostly from eastern South America; they only barely reach the Pular region and the only during summer. The weather is characterized by the lack of cloud cover, which in turn leads to extreme solar irradiation and an intense diurnal temperature cycle. Mean annual precipitation around Pular ranges between 40 millimetres (1.6 in) at low elevations to 100 millimetres (3.9 in) at high altitudes. Groundwater, some of which bears traces of volcanic influence (although not necessarily from Pular itself) comes from the volcanoes in the area and salt flats east of the main arc and drains to the Salar de Atacama. During the ice ages, there may have been changes in atmospheric circulation, aiding the growth of glaciers.

Despite the low temperatures, the extremely arid climate of the Andean Arid Diagonal prevents the formation of glaciers on the mountains of the Central Andes. During winter they are covered with snow but the snow disappears during the summer months. Only the highest summits like Ojos del Salado and Llullaillaco feature year-round ice, although a borderline example of a glacier is found on the southern side of Pular, and the ridge is frequently covered by snow. During the Last Glacial Maximum, however, numerous ice caps and valley glaciers developed.

Numerous moraines occur within the drainage network of Pajonales-Pular and reflect past glaciation, when the equilibrium line altitude (the line that separates the altitude where a glaciers grows from the altitude at which it melts) had descended to 5,200 metres (17,100 ft) elevation. The mountain was extensively glaciated in the past, with five glacier systems on its northwestern and six on the southeastern slopes. The glaciers reached lengths of 6 kilometres (3.7 mi) and formed numerous sets of moraines at less than 5 kilometres (3.1 mi) elevation. A snowfield presently occupies one of the areas on the southeastern slopes that was formerly glaciated, and ephemeral lakes filled with snowmelt water occasionally appear on the mountain.

== Biology ==
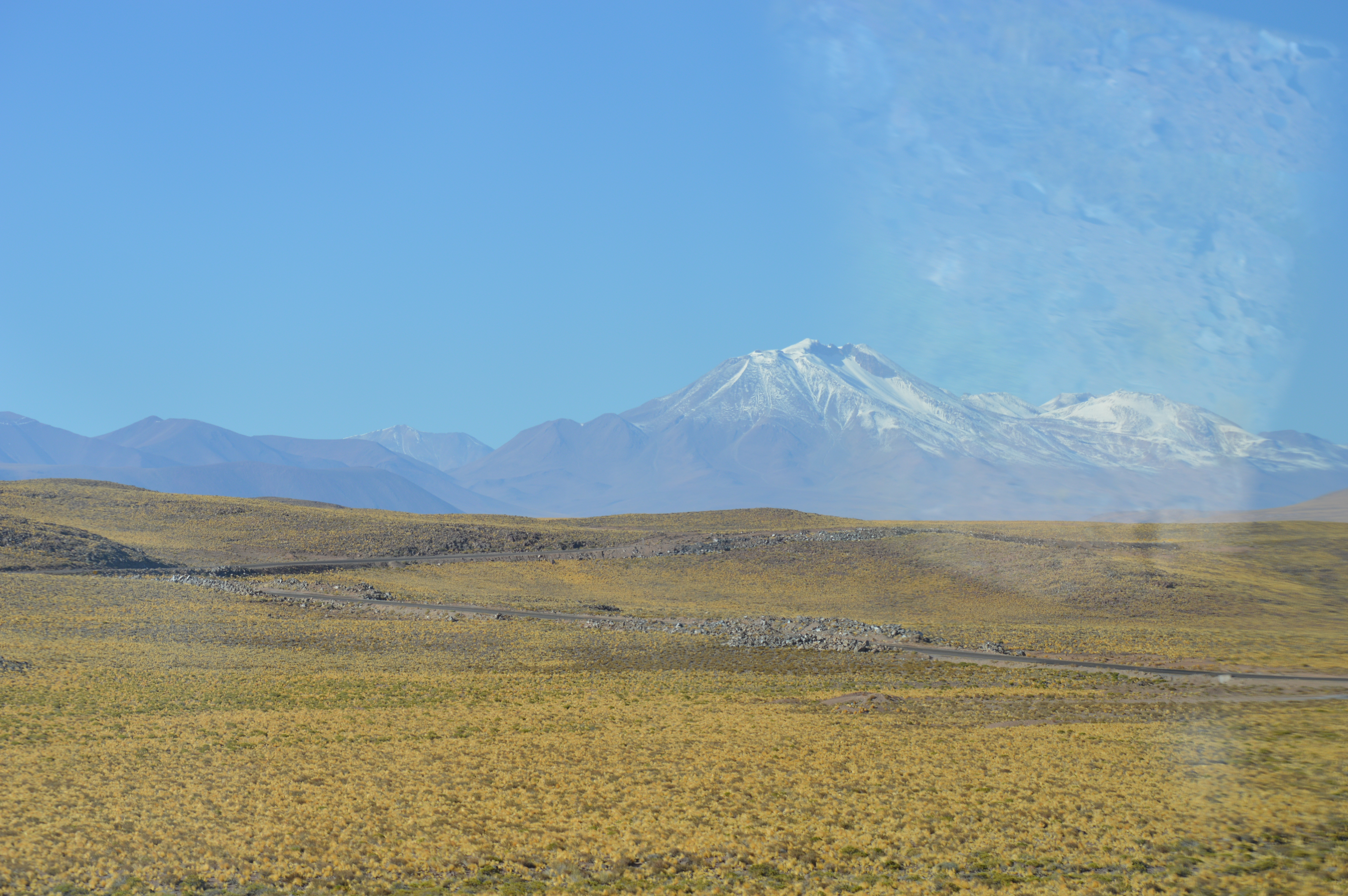
Pular volcano

Climbers noted mice on the mountain, while herds of sheep and goats roam its lower sides. Starting in 2011, there have been disputes about the use of water in the region, including at Pular.

== See also ==
- List of volcanoes in Chile
- List of Ultras of South America
- Caichinque
- Monturaqui crater
- List of Andean peaks with known pre-Columbian ascents
