= List of power stations in Chile =

The following page lists some of the power stations in Chile.

== Coal ==
Station	Town	Owner	Capacity (MW)	Refs	Decommissioning status
Angamos	Antofagasta	AES Andes	544		2025
Guacolda (5 Units)	Huasco	AES Andes	764		2025
Norgener	Antofagasta	AES Andes	277		2040
Ventanas Unit 2	Valparaiso	AES Andes	218		2022 (December)
Ventanas Unit 3	Valparaiso	AES Andes	267		2025
Ventanas Unit 4	Valparaiso	AES Andes	270		2025
Cochrane	Antofagasta	Engie Energia	548		2040
Andina Hornitos	Antofagasta	Engie Energia	230		2026
Mejillones Unit CTM 1	Antofagasta	Engie Energia	162		2025 (December)
Mejillones Unit CTM 2	Antofagasta	Engie Energia	172		2025 (December)
Infrastructura Energética Mejillones (IEM)	Antofagasta	Engie Energia	375		2025 (conversion to natural gas by this date)
Santa Maria	Coronel	Colbun	370		2040

== Gas ==
Station	Town	Owner	Capacity (MW)	Refs
Antilhue	Valdivia		100	
Atacama	Mejillones		780	
Cordones	Copiapo		160	
Colmito			60	
Diego de Almagro			46	
Husaco			63	
Los Vientos	Llay Llay		126	
Mejillones	Mejillones		250, +140MW battery	
Nehuenco	Quillota		108	
Nueva Renca	Santiago		370	
Quintero	Quintero		257	
San Isidro	Quillota		778	139
San Lorenzo			60	
Santa Lidia			139	
Taltal	Taltal		243	
Tocopilla	Tocopilla	Engie	400	

== Hydroelectric ==
Station	Town	Coordinates	Capacity (MW)
Antuco Hydroelectric Plant			300
Colbún Hydroelectric Plant			400
Pangue Hydroelectric Plant	Alto Bío Bío	37.910448°S 71.611419°W	467
Pehuenche Hydroelectric Plant			500
Ralco Hydroelectric Plant		37°59′45″S 71°31′00″W	690
Rapel Hydroelectric Plant		34°02′29″S 71°35′19″W	377
El Toro Hydroelectric Plant			400

== Wind farms ==
Station	Town	Coordinates	Capacity (MW)	Refs
El Arrayán Wind Farm			115	
Los Cururos Wind Farm			110	
Punta Palmeras Wind Farm	Canela		45	
Talinay wind farm			90	
Taltal wind farm			99	
Totoral Wind Farm			46	

== See also ==
- Solar power in Chile
- List of power stations in South America
- List of largest power stations in the world
