= Sierra Gorda, Chile =

Sierra Gorda
- Commune
- Coat of arms Map of Sierra Gorda commune in Antofagasta Region Location in Chile
- Coordinates: 22°54′S 69°19′W
- Country: Chile
- Region: Antofagasta
- Province: Antofagasta

Government
  - Type: Municipality
  - Alcalde: José Guerrero Venegas

Area
  - Total: 12,886.4 km^{2} (4,975.5 sq mi)
- Elevation: 1,615 m (5,299 ft)

Population (2012 Census)
  - Total: 1,069
  - Density: 0.08296/km^{2} (0.2149/sq mi)
  - Urban: 0
  - Rural: 2,356

Sex
  - Men: 1,791
  - Women: 565
- Time zone: UTC-4 (CLT)
  - Summer (DST): UTC-3 (CLST)
- Area code: (+56) 5
- Website: Municipality of Sierra Gorda

Sierra Gorda is a Chilean commune in Antofagasta Province, Antofagasta Region. The total population was 1,516 as of the 2012 census. The two main settlements are the villages of Sierra Gorda (pop. 428) and Baquedano (pop. 825).

The Sierra Gorda copper mine is located 2 km north-west of the village of Sierra Gorda. Due to the mining business, Sierra Gorda has the eighth highest average household income in the country (PPP US$34,842 in 2006).

The village of Sierra Gorda stages a yearly summer music festival called Festival del Desierto ("Festival of the Desert"), which attracts thousands of people from nearby towns, and even from neighboring countries such as Peru and Bolivia.

== Climate ==
Climate data for Sierra Gorda, Chile
Month	Jan	Feb	Mar	Apr	May	Jun	Jul	Aug	Sep	Oct	Nov	Dec	Year
Mean daily maximum °C (°F)	31.2 (88.2)	30.9 (87.6)	30.7 (87.3)	29.3 (84.7)	27.4 (81.3)	26.2 (79.2)	25.8 (78.4)	27.7 (81.9)	29.1 (84.4)	30.5 (86.9)	31.2 (88.2)	31.4 (88.5)	29.3 (84.7)
Daily mean °C (°F)	20.6 (69.1)	21.2 (70.2)	20.7 (69.3)	19.2 (66.6)	17.2 (63.0)	15.2 (59.4)	14.4 (57.9)	15.6 (60.1)	16.8 (62.2)	17.3 (63.1)	19.1 (66.4)	19.8 (67.6)	18.1 (64.6)
Mean daily minimum °C (°F)	9.9 (49.8)	10.3 (50.5)	9.4 (48.9)	6.8 (44.2)	4.7 (40.5)	2.8 (37.0)	2.1 (35.8)	3.1 (37.6)	4.5 (40.1)	5.8 (42.4)	6.7 (44.1)	8.3 (46.9)	6.2 (43.2)
Average precipitation mm (inches)	0 (0)	0 (0)	0 (0)	0 (0)	0 (0)	0 (0)	0 (0)	0 (0)	0 (0)	0 (0)	0 (0)	0 (0)	1 (0.0)
Source: Atlas Agroclimatico de Chile (temperatures 1994–2014, precipitation 1994–2015)

== Demographics ==
According to the 2002 census of the National Statistics Institute, Sierra Gorda had 2,356 inhabitants (1,791 men and 565 women), and is an entirely rural area. The population grew by 65.3% (931 persons) between the 1992 and 2002 censuses.

== Administration ==
As a commune, Sierra Gorda is a third-level administrative division of Chile administered by a municipal council, headed by an alcalde who is directly elected every four years. The 2021-2024 alcalde is José Guerrero Venegas.

Within the electoral divisions of Chile, Sierra Gorda is represented in the Chamber of Deputies by Pedro Araya (PRI) and Manuel Rojas (UDI) as part of the 4th electoral district, together with Antofagasta, Mejillones and Taltal. The commune is represented in the Senate by Jorge Soria (Ind., 2018–2026) and Luz Ebensperger (UDI, 2018–2022) as part of the 2nd senatorial constituency (Antofagasta Region).

== 2008 Quantum of Solace incident ==
While filming for the James Bond film Quantum of Solace was under way in the village, the mayor of Sierra Gorda, Carlos López Vega, drove his car onto the set because the crew had not asked his permission to film in his commune.
