= Sierra Gorda mine =

Copper and molybdenum mine in Antofagasta Province, Chile

Sierra Gorda
- Location within Antofagasta Region Location within Chile
- Location: Sierra Gorda, Antofagasta Region, Chile; 22°51′9.63″S 69°20′15.65″W
- Products: Copper
- Production: 150,198 metric tonnes of copper fines 2,982 metric tons of molybdenum
- Financial year: 2023
- Opened: 2015
- Company: KGHM (55%); South32 (45%)

Sierra Gorda mine in Chile is a copper and molybdenum open pit mine which started production on October 1, 2014. The mine is located 2 km north-west of the village of Sierra Gorda in the Antofagasta Province of northern Chile.

== Description ==
Sierra Gorda SCM is the project company operating the mine. They are a joint venture between KGHM International Ltd, subsidiary of KGHM Polska Miedź (55%), and South32 (45%). South32 had taken over the 45% stake from Sumitomo Group in 2021 (previously 31.5% Suitomo Metal Mining and 13.5% Suitomo Corporation).

Feasibilities studies were done on 2011 by Fluor Corporation. Other major milestones of the Copper-Molybdenum mine includes EPCM contracts and respective loan agreements to finance the construction both done on 2012, followed by water pipeline construction in 2013 and finally mine production starting in October 2014.

By 2017, when prices for copper were falling worldwide, KGHM announced it would not start a second expansion phase, which was supposed to raise production from 98,000 tonnes of copper (2016) to a projected 220,000 tonnes.

For the year 2021, the mine was "expected to produce 180,000 t of copper, 5,000 t of molybdenum, 54,000 oz of gold and 1.6 Moz of silver". In 2024, South32 announced the addition of a fourth line for grinding ore, which is supposed to increase production by 20%. At that time, the company said the mine had an 782 million tonnes of ore, with 0.44% copper, which should be enough for 16 years.

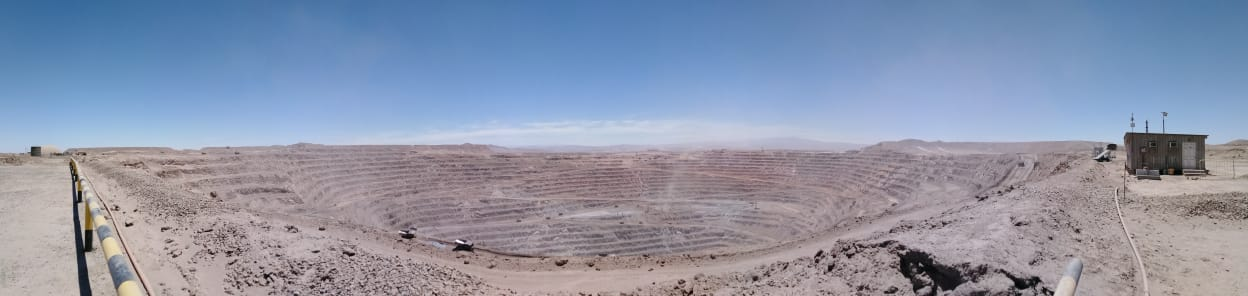
Sierra Gorda Mine in 2018

== Geology ==
The porphyry copper ore of the mine is part of wider metallogenic belt of Paleocene age that include the deposits of El Salvador, Spence and Cuprita.
