= Ventanas Power Plant =

Coal fired power plant in Quintero, Chile

Coordinates: 32.7497°S 71.4830°W

Ventanas Power Plant is a coal-fired electrical generating station in Quintero, Valparaíso Region, Chile. The plant produces 875MW of electricity, and is the largest power plant in Chile. The plant was originally built in 1964 then expanded in 1977, 2010 and 2013. It is currently operated by Gener S.A. The plant employs 965 own workers and 870 contractual employees.

== Impacts of Ventana Unit 4 ==
The latest addition to AES Gener's Ventanas coal-fired complex, Campiche was originally scheduled for completion in May 2011. However, in June 2009, Chile's Supreme Court ordered that construction be halted, citing improper zoning of the plant. AES Gener had already completed 40% of the $500 million project before it was halted. Subsequent regulatory changes allowed construction of the plant to resume, but the project was again suspended in early 2010 as Puchuncaví municipality took legal steps against the plant due to environmental concerns. In July, 2010, AES Gener reached an agreement with Puchuncaví to renew construction of Campiche, promising in return to invest nearly US$80 million in environmental improvements of the company's local thermal power plants, in public projects and forestation. The plant was brought online in March 2013. In late December 2013, several tons of sardines washed up dead on Ventanas beach near the plant, spurring renewed controversy over Campiche's environmental impact and prompting calls for suspension of operations.

== See also ==
- List of power stations in Chile
- List of largest power stations in the world
