= Llullaillaco =

Dormant stratovolcano in South America

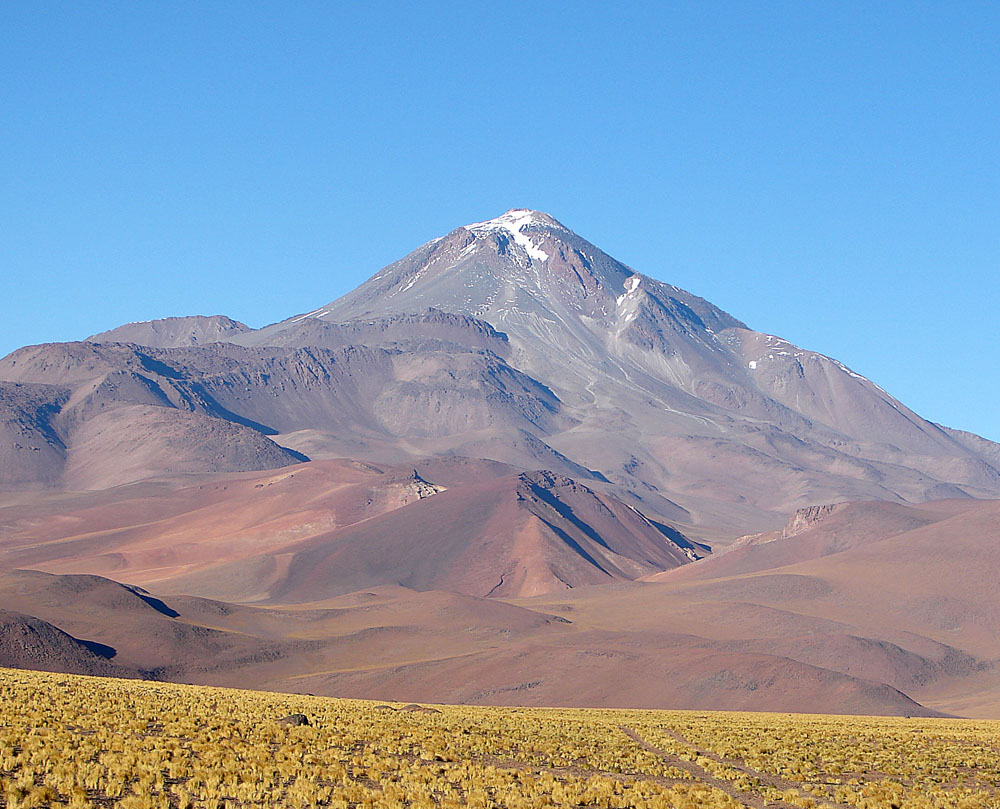
- Llullaillaco from the east

Highest point
- Elevation: 6,723 m (22,057 ft)
- Prominence: 2,344 m (7,690 ft)
- Listing: Ultra
- Coordinates: 24°43′11″S 68°32′12″W

Geography
- Location within Chile
- Location: Chile and Argentina
- Parent range: Andes, Puna de Atacama

Geology
- Rock age: Pleistocene
- Mountain type: Stratovolcano
- Last eruption: May 1877

Climbing
- First ascent: By Inca, in or before 1520

Llullaillaco (Spanish: [(ɟ)ʝuʝajˈʝako] or [ʎuʎajˈʎako]) is a dormant stratovolcano on the border between Argentina (Salta Province) and Chile (Antofagasta Region). It is part of the Llullaillaco National Park and lies in the Puna de Atacama, a region of tall volcanic peaks on a high plateau close to the Atacama Desert, one of the driest places in the world. Its maximum elevation is most commonly given as 6,723 metres (22,057 ft), making it the second-highest active volcano in the world. Despite its height, it is not clear whether the volcano has any glaciers or merely patches of perennial snow and ice. Between 3,700 m and 5,000 m elevation there is a sparse plant cover, while at lower altitudes the climate is too dry for plants to grow. A species of mouse on Llullaillaco is the vertebrate species living at the highest-known altitude.

The volcano formed during the Pleistocene in two stages, named Llullaillaco I and Llullaillaco II. The oldest rocks are about 1.5 million years old. About 150,000 years ago, the volcano's southeastern flank collapsed, generating a debris avalanche that reached as far as 25 kilometres (16 mi) from the summit. During the last stage, three conspicuous lava flows were emplaced on the summit. The youngest-dated rocks are 930 ± 140 years old, but there are reports of activity from the 19th century.

There are archaeological sites on the mountain and at its foot; Llullaillaco marks the second-highest archaeological site in the world. The first recorded ascent was in 1950. In 1999, the mummified remains of three children, known as the Children of Llullaillaco, were found at its summit. They are presumed to have been human sacrifices.

== Name ==
The name Llullaillaco is usually associated to the Quechua word llulla meaning "false", "lie" or "deceitful" and yaku or llaco meaning "water". This name probably refers to meltwater from snow, which flows down the slopes but then is absorbed into the soil; normally mountains are sources for water. Another possibility is that it refers to the danger from floods in the local valleys. Other translations are (Aymara) "hot water" after lloclla "warm" and yacu "water", and (Quechua) "thinking", "memory"+"water" or "thing that hardens after forming tender" llullu, which may refer to volcanic activity. A final possibility is that it might be derived from the Atacameno language, from yuyo (a quinoa plant variety) and ac or yaco, "water", meaning "yuyo waters".

== Geography and geomorphology ==
Llullaillaco is located in the northwestern Argentine Andes, towards the southern end of the Puna. The frontier between Argentina and Chile passes over the mountain. The Argentine portion is in the Los Andes Department of Salta Province and the Chilean in the Taltal Department of the Antofagasta Region. About 30 km northeast of Llullaillaco, the Salta–Antofagasta railway crosses the Andes at Socompa. Humans first moved into the area about 8,000 BCE. The region was inhabited by hunters and shepherds in pre-Hispanic times. At some point between 1470 and 1532 CE, the Inca empire occupied the region.

There are numerous abandoned mines (Note: Sulfur mining concessions for the area were granted in 1901 or thereabouts.) in the region, and the active lithium production plant "Proyecto Mariana" at the Salar de Llullaillaco. Azufrera Esperanto is an abandoned sulfur mine north of Llullaillaco and is associated with an area of hydrothermal alteration. The mine can be reached through a road or path from the northwest. Another abandoned mine lies south of the volcano. Mina Amalia is an abandoned borate mine and Mina Luisa and Mina Maria abandoned salt mines at Salar de Llullaillaco. A weather station installed on Llullaillaco in 2004 was for some time the highest in the world. The region is dry and located at high altitudes, making work in the area difficult. The extreme environmental conditions have been compared to conditions on Mars.

=== Geomorphology ===
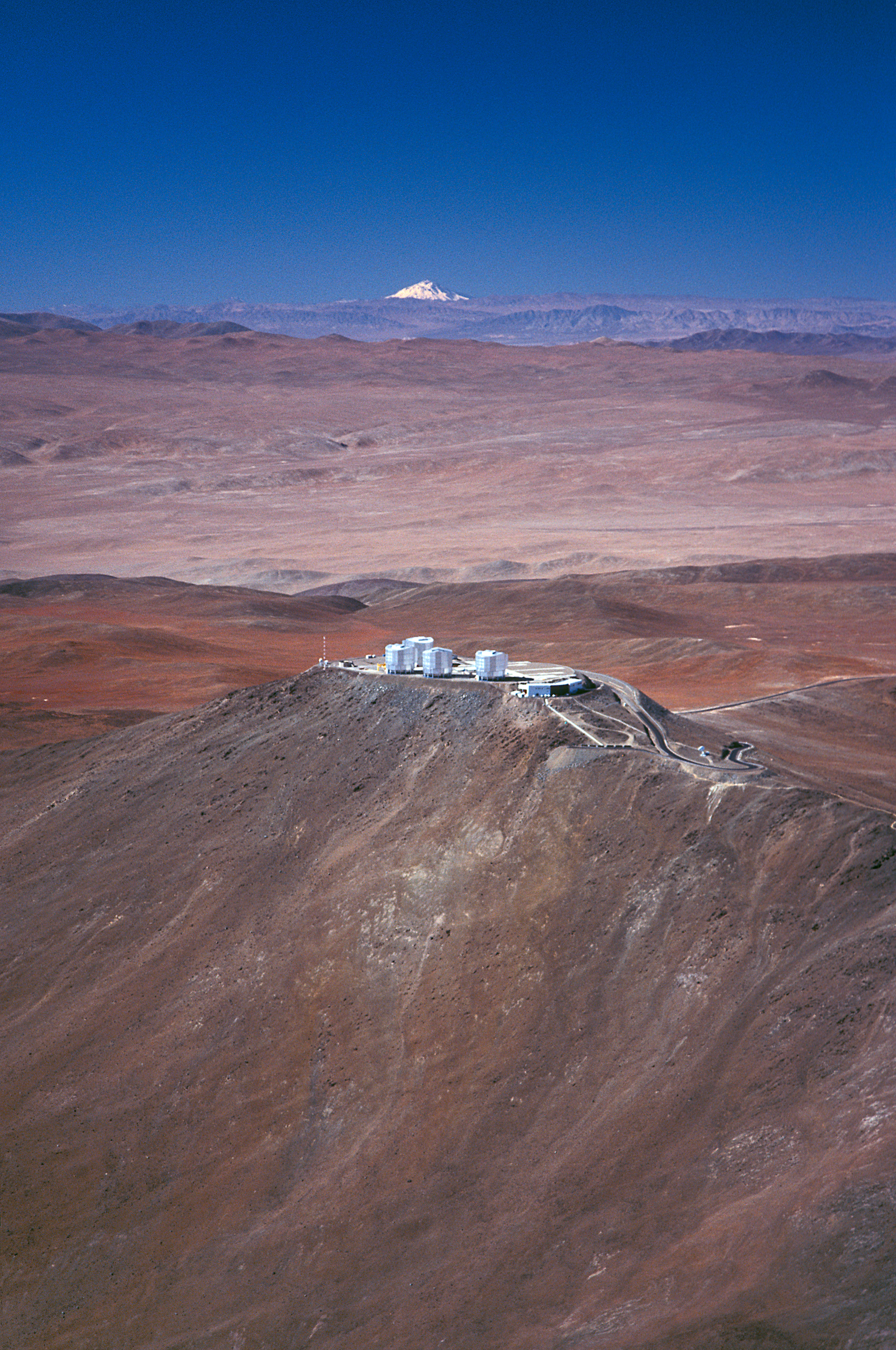
Llullaillaco seen from Cerro Paranal, 189 km away

The volcano is an imposing mountain, rising by 3,800 m and 3,750 m above the Salar de Punta Negra and the Salar de Llullaillaco, 36 km and 20 km away, respectively. With a summit height of 6,723 m, (or 6,739 m) it is one of the highest mountains in the Andes (third highest in Chile and seventh highest in the Andes, according to John Biggar) and the second- or third-highest volcano in the world (Ojos del Salado is the highest). In the early 20th century, Llullaillaco was thought to be the highest volcano in the world. The elevation is to a large degree consequence of the underlying terrain, which rises about 4 km above sea level. The height of the mountain and the clear air in the region make Llullaillaco visible from Cerro Paranal, 190 km away as measured through Google Earth. The view from the mountain extends from Licancabur north over the Nevados de Cachi mountains east to Ojos del Salado 250 km south; mountains in between are visible as well.

Llullaillaco is a composite volcano formed mostly by lava flows. It rises about 2.2–2.5 km above the surrounding terrain and hundreds of metres above surrounding mountains. The summit of Llullaillaco is formed by a small cone with about four associated lava domes, which reach lengths of 1–3 km and have abrupt walls. Three hollows, probably volcanic craters, lie east of a 200-metre-long crest at the summit. The slopes of the volcano are fairly steep, with an altitude drop of 1,800 m over only 3 km horizontal distance. The slopes high up are steeper than those at lower altitudes. A plateau at 5,600–6,100 m elevation is the remnant of an eroded crater from an early stage in Llullaillaco's development.

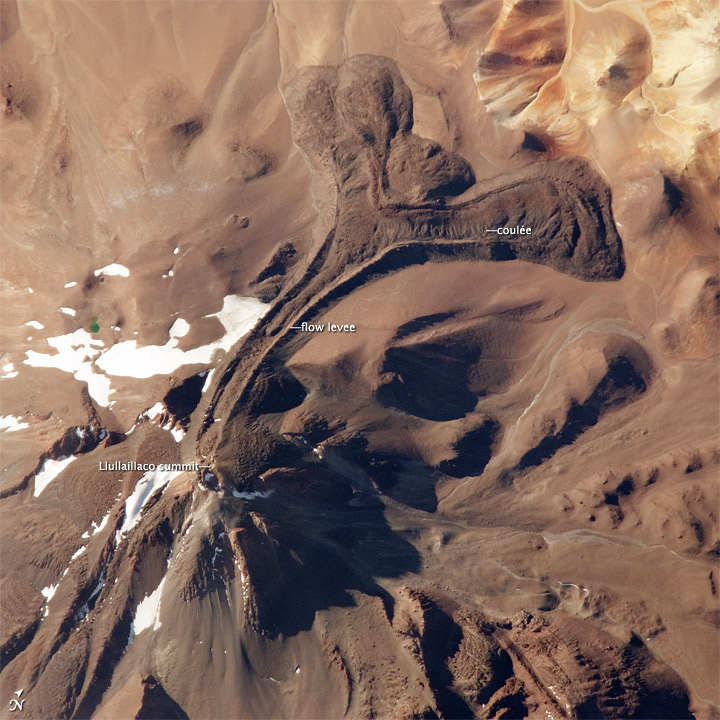
Llullaillaco seen from space, with lava flows visible

Three young-looking, 4.5–8 km long lava flows emanate from the summit cone to the north and south. Morphologically, these flows are reddish-black aa lava flows and feature black and reddish glassy blocks with sizes of 5 m. The fronts of the stubby, lobe-shaped flows are up to 15 m thick. The northern flow has prominent levee-like structures and splits into a northwestern and northeastern branch upon reaching an obstacle. The southwestern lava flow is 6 km long and was fairly viscous when it was erupted. It almost reaches a road southwest of the volcano. The third flow is just east from the southwestern and descends an altitude of 2 km. The flows have levee-like structures and ridges. On the northern flank is Azufrera Esperanto, a 5,561-metre-high eroded volcano with sulfur deposits and traces of hydrothermal alteration. The existence of a cave on Llullaillaco is doubtful. The edifice covers an elliptical area of 23 km × 17 km with about 37 cubic kilometres (8.9 cu mi)—50 cubic kilometres (12 cu mi) of volcanic rock. The ground at Llullaillaco is formed mostly by lavic rocks and block debris, which are frequently buried by tephra. The rocks are grey, except where weathering has coloured them black, brown, red or yellow, and their appearance is vitrophyric or porphyritic.

Several dry valleys originate on Llullaillaco, including Quebrada de las Zorritas on the north-northeastern slope, Quebrada El Salado and Quebrada Llullaillaco on the northwestern slope, and Quebrada La Barda on the southwestern slope. Most of the dry valleys drain into Salar de Punta Negra. There is little erosion by water, and the valley network is poorly developed. There is water only episodically, during snowmelt. Only Quebrada de las Zorritas carries permanent water. There is a permanent spring there, possibly in Quebrada de Llullaillaco and Quebrada de Tocomar as well, while there are no known springs on the Argentine side of Llullaillaco. Darapsky in 1900 reported the existence of warm springs at Ojo del Llullaillaco and Ojo de Zorritas.

Several small lakes are found at 5,850 m elevation. At 6,170 m elevation on the northwestern flank is Lago Llullaillaco lake, a 1.2–1.4-hectare (3.0–3.5-acre) frozen waterbody. It is one of the highest lakes in the world.

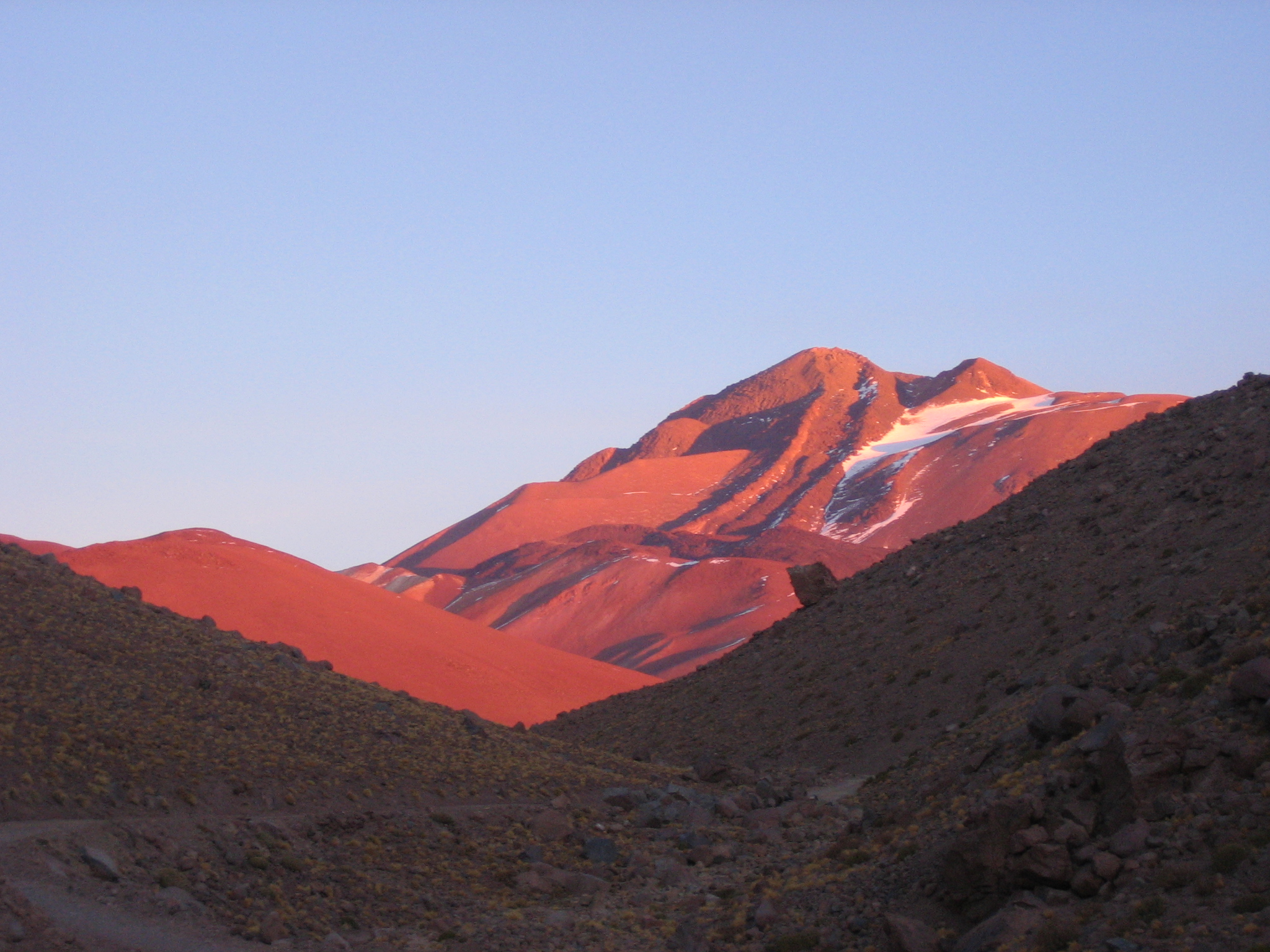
Llullaillaco during sunset

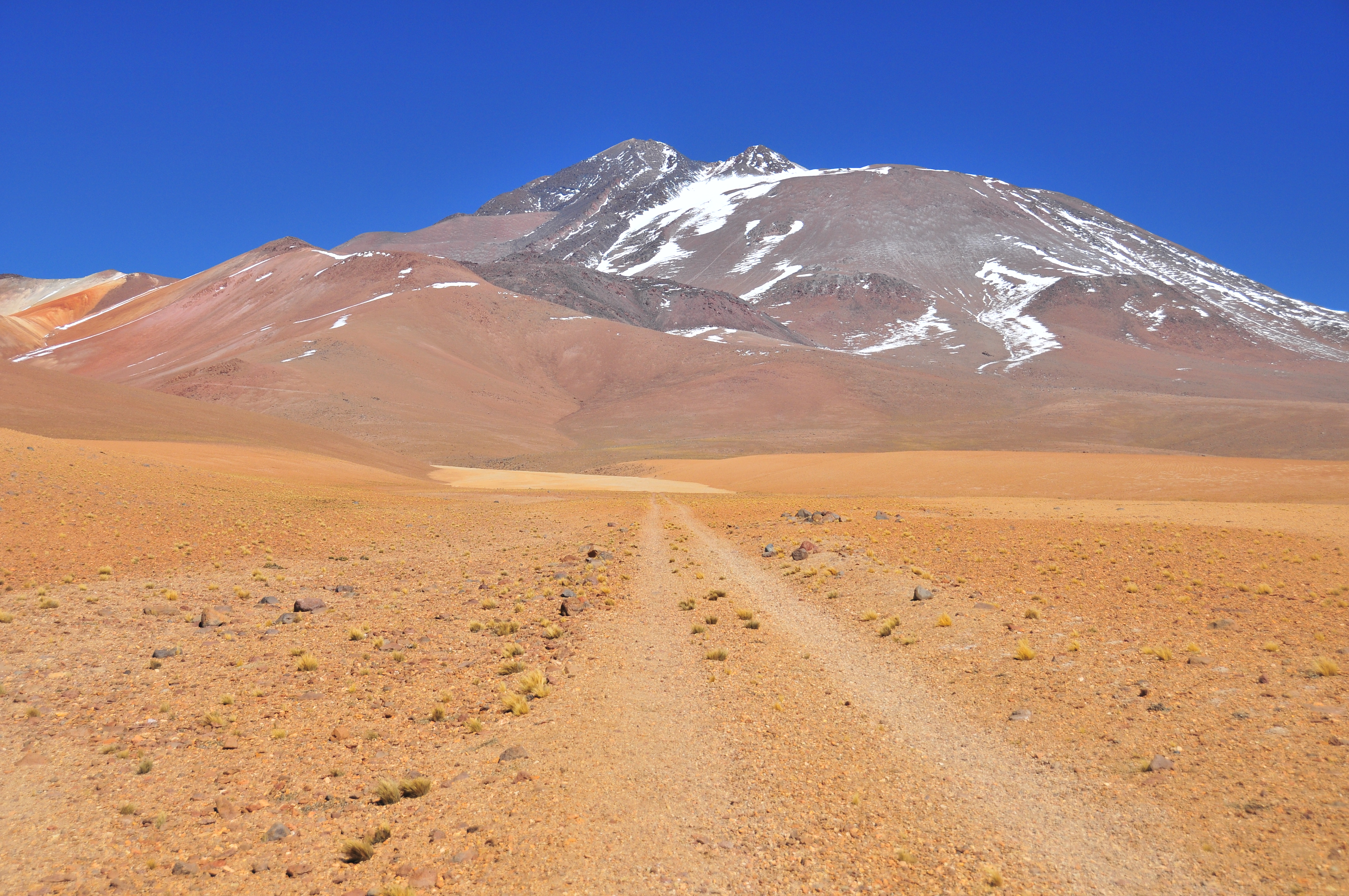
Llullailaco with a road leading to the mountain

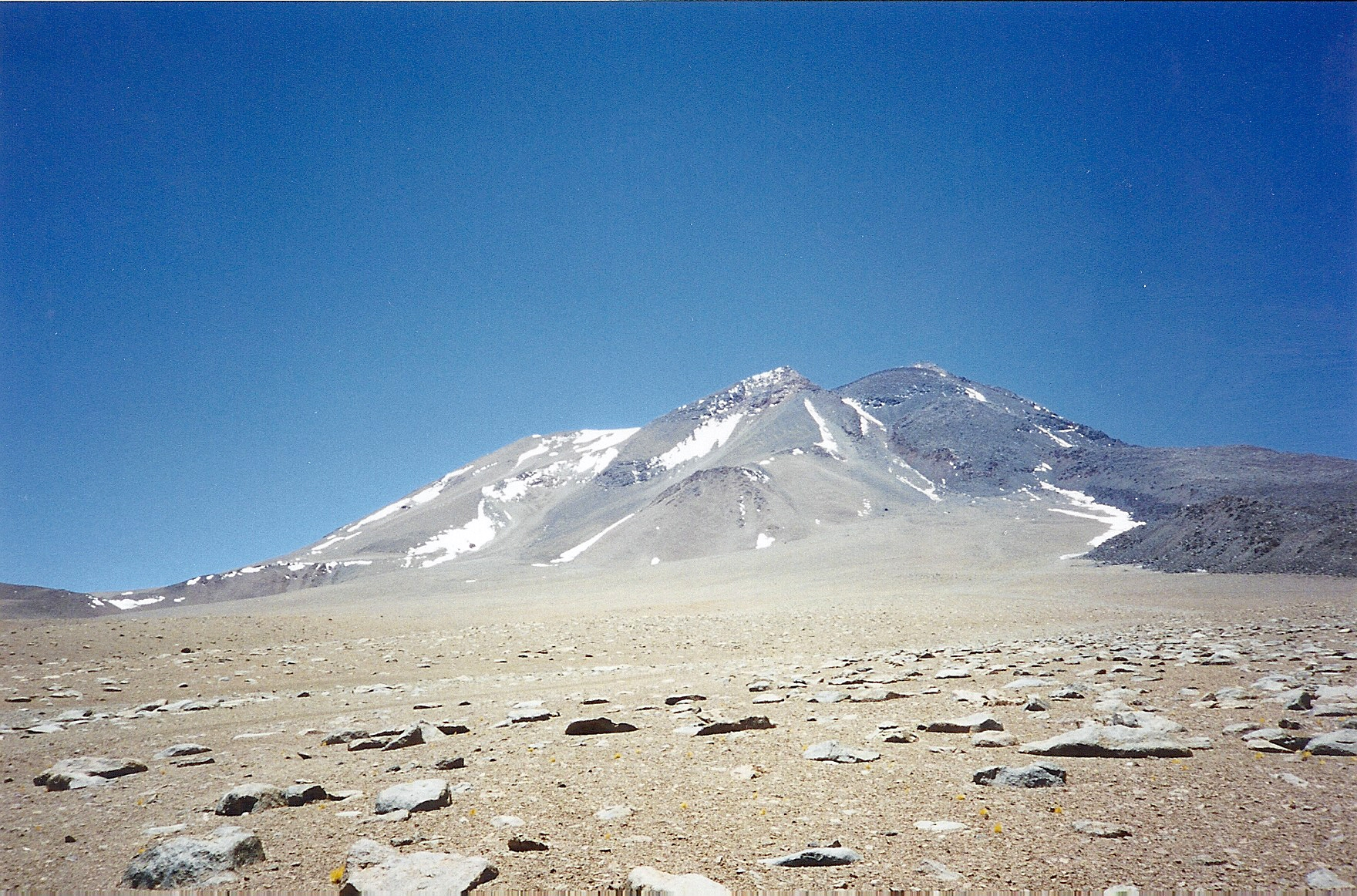
Llullaillaco from the base camp

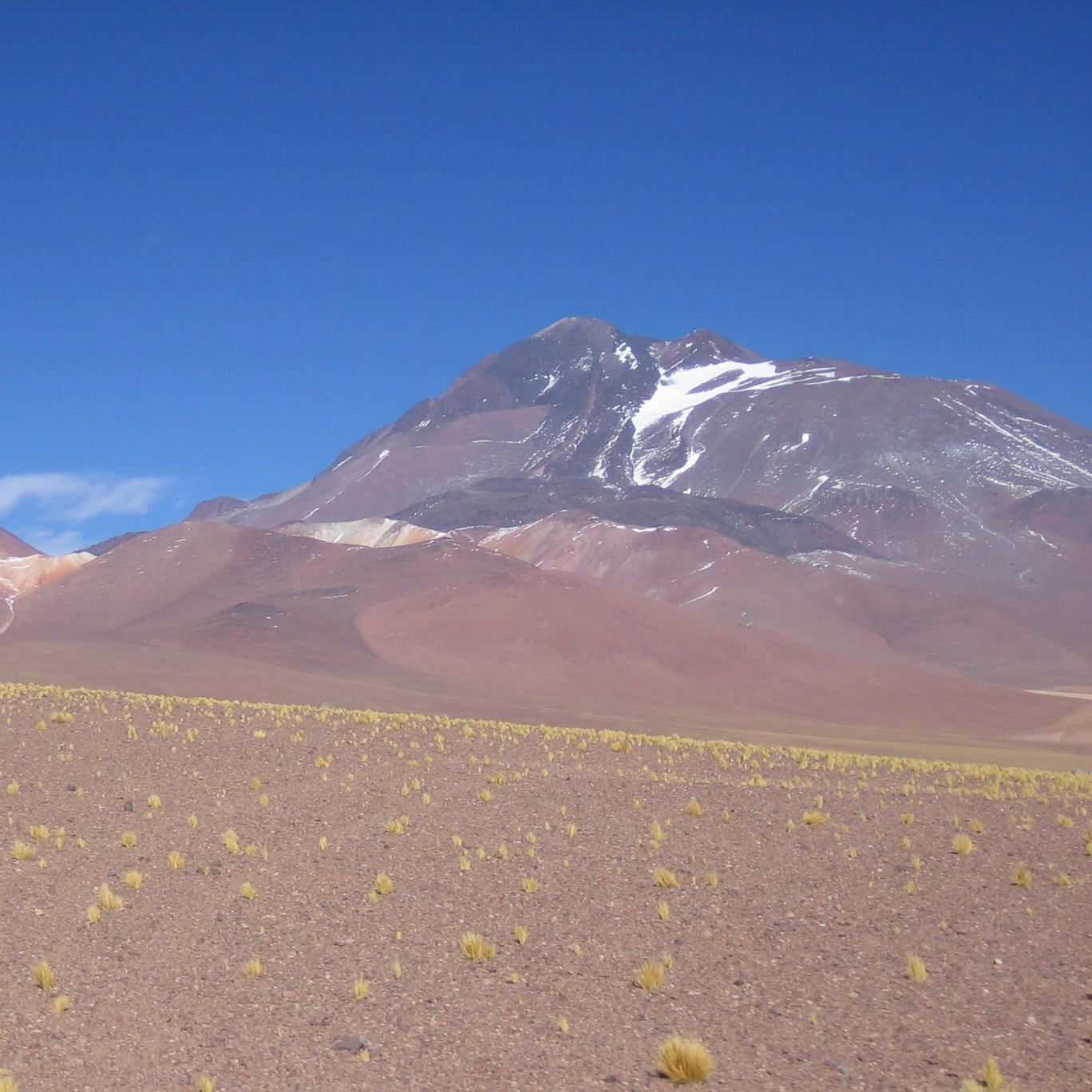
Lava flow from Llullaillaco

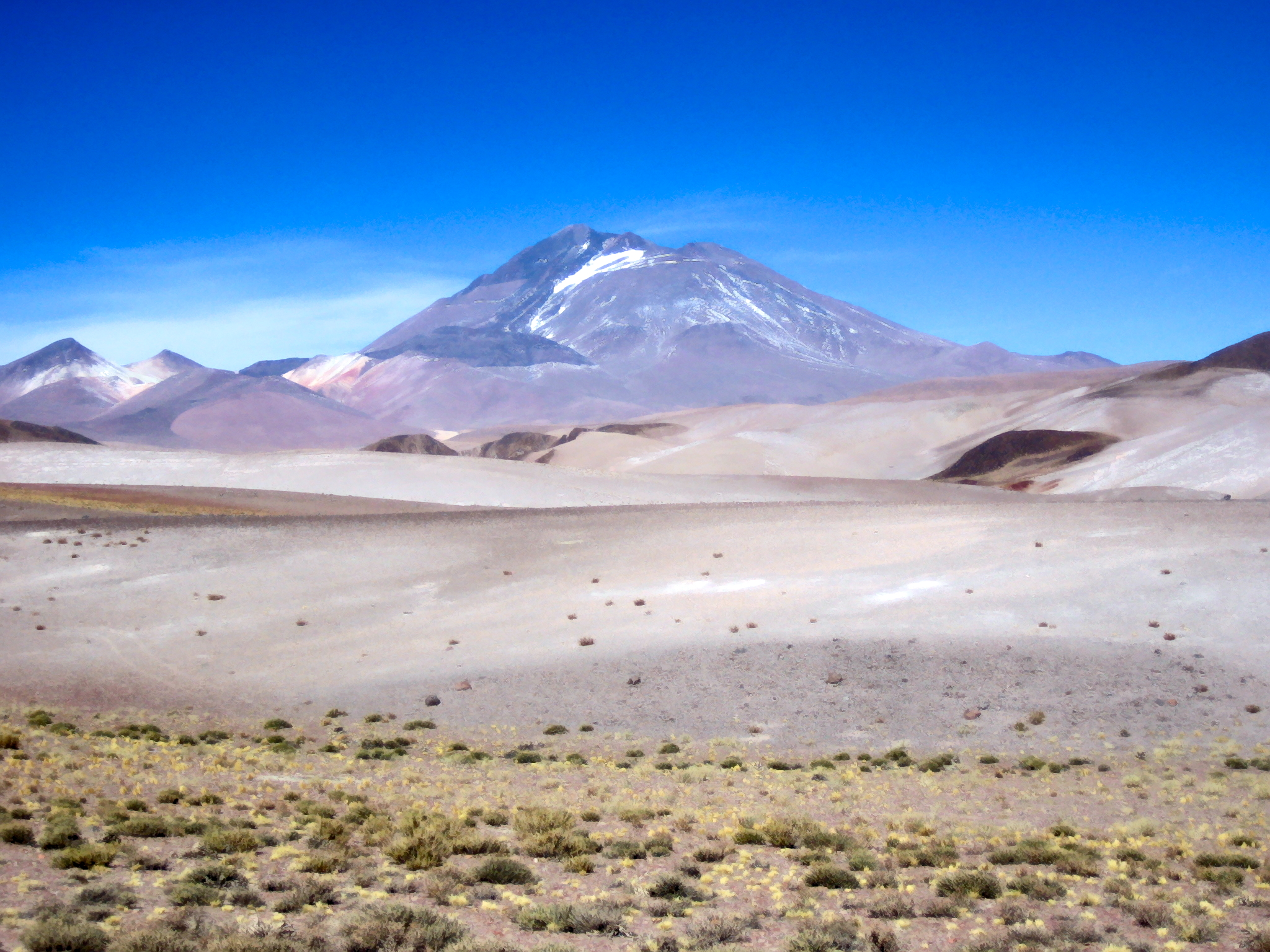
Llullaillaco in Salta

=== Debris avalanche ===
A major landslide occurred in the volcano's history during the late Pleistocene, probably triggered by volcanic activity. This landslide descended the eastern-southeastern flanks of the volcano into Argentina, first over a steep slope of 20° on the volcano, split around Cerro Rosado and entered the Salina de Llullaillaco 25 km east of the summit, extending up to 5 km into the salar. The toe of the avalanche reaches a thickness of 10 m above the salar in the avalanche's southern lobe. Part of the avalanche was channelled in a valley between Cerro Rosado and an unnamed volcano farther south. When it reached Cerro Rosado, the avalanche climbed about 400 m and mostly continued to flow southeast into the main avalanche path, with only a small flow continuing northeastwards. Part of the run-up avalanche later collapsed backward over the main avalanche deposit. Unlike Socompa farther north, a landslide scar is only poorly developed at Llullaillaco despite the large size of the collapse; it was largely filled in later by lava flows and volcaniclastic debris.

This landslide has been subdivided into four facies and features landforms like levees up to 50 m high, longitudinal ridges and a run-up mark on Cerro Rosado. Such ridges may be associated with uneven underlying terrain. The surface of the slide is covered by lava bombs less than 1 m long, blocks exceeding 2 m width, cobbles, and gravel-like rocks. The largest blocks with sizes of up to 20 m are found close to the collapse scarp. Overall, the margins of the landslide are very crisp and the surface covered by hummocks.

The landslide deposit covers a surface of about 165 square kilometres (64 sq mi). Its volume has been estimated at 1–2 km^{3} and the speed at 45–90 metres per second (150–300 ft/s). This speed range is comparable to that of the Colima, Lastarria, and Mount St. Helens debris avalanches. The landslide occurred no earlier than 156,000 to 148,000 ± 5,000 years ago; it might coincide with the 48,000-year-old lava flow. Another possibility is that the collapse took place in multiple failures. Some volcanic rocks were still hot at the time of the collapse, indicating that volcanic activity occurred immediately before the collapse. A smaller undated avalanche occurred on the northeastern flank.

Such landslides are common at volcanoes, where they are favoured by the steep edifices that form from lava flows being stacked on top of each other. It is not usually known what triggers the collapse, although eruption-associated earthquakes are suspected to play a role. Other volcanoes in the region with sector collapses are: Lastarria, Ollague, San Pedro, Socompa, and Tata Sabaya. The Mellado and Cerro Rosado volcanoes close to Llullaillaco also display evidence of sector collapses.

== Geology ==
=== Regional setting ===
Volcanism in the Andes is caused by the subduction of the Nazca Plate and the Antarctic Plate beneath the South America Plate. The Nazca Plate subducts at a speed of 7–9 centimetres per year (2.8–3.5 in/year) and the Antarctic Plate at a speed of 2 cm/year. Volcanism is not continuous along the Andes; rather it occurs in four distinct volcanic zones: Northern Volcanic Zone (NVZ), Central Volcanic Zone (CVZ), Southern Volcanic Zone (SVZ) and Austral Volcanic Zone (AVZ). The formation of magma results from the release of water and other volatile material from the subducting plate, which is then injected into the above-lying mantle wedge. The volcanic zones are separated by gaps, where subduction occurs at a flatter angle due to the presence of ridges on the downgoing plate: The Nazca Ridge in the gap between the NVZ and CVZ, the Juan Fernandez Ridge in the one between the CVZ and SVZ, and the gap between the SVZ and AVZ is associated with the Chile Triple Junction. Minor ridges are associated with decreased volcanism rather than its cessation; the Taltal Ridge projects under Llullaillaco, an area where magma output was less than to the north and south.

About 178 Holocene volcanoes are found in the Andes, 60 of which have been active in historical times. In addition, there are large calderas and monogenetic volcanoes.

Llullaillaco is one of more than 1,000 volcanoes in the CVZ. At least 44 volcanic centres with historical activity and 18 large caldera-forming volcanoes have been identified in the Central Volcanic Zone; the most active is Lascar, and Guallatiri and San Pedro have had historical eruptions as well. Volcanism in the Central Volcanic Zone takes place mostly on the Altiplano and the Cordillera Occidental, where high stratovolcanoes with heights of over 6,000 m occur. One of the largest vertical drops on Earth, almost 15 km, exists between the summit of Llullaillaco and the Peru-Chile Trench 300 km farther west. The Wadati-Benioff zone lies at 180 km depth.

=== Local setting ===
The region is dominated by large volcanic cones (often more than 6,000 m high) in the Altiplano and Western Cordillera, and extensive salt flats in low-altitude areas. Southeast of the mountain is Salina de Llullaillaco, Salar de Llullaillaco in Argentina, and Salar de Punta Negra northwest of Llullaillaco in Chile. Neighbouring mountains are 4,923-metre-high Cerro Mitral southwest and 5,473-metre-high Volcan Chuculay north of Llullaillaco. Cerro Rosado is 17 km east of Llullaillaco; it is a 5,383-metre-high volcano which erupted dacitic lava flows on its northeastern and southern flanks during the Pliocene–Quaternary. Mitral mountain (5,015 m) lies southwest of Llullaillaco and is of Miocene age. It features an eroded crater that opens to the northwest. Iris mountain (5,461 m) north of Llullaillaco is constructed of Pliocene rocks. Other volcanoes in the neighbourhood are Dos Naciones, Cerro Silla, and Cerro 5074. Llullaillaco is associated with a local crustal upwarp. Salar de Llullaillaco is a salt pan 20 km east of the volcano, behind Cerro Rosado. It lies at 3,750 m elevation, and features warm springs at its western and southwestern shores. Due east of Salar de Llullaillaco is Salar de Arizaro.

The terrain around Llullaillaco consists of andesite and dacite lavas and pyroclastics of Miocene to Pliocene age. The basement in the 70-kilometre-thick crust is formed by Paleozoic sedimentary and volcanic rocks, including marine and volcanic sediments and intrusive rocks. It is mostly buried by Cenozoic volcanic rocks, except in isolated outcrops both west and east of Llullaillaco: The 282 ± 7 million-year-old Llullaillaco plutonic complex, the Devonian–Carboniferous Zorritas Formation and Oligocene–Miocene layers in the Quebrada de las Zorritas. The rocks of Llullaillaco overlie both this basement and Tertiary ignimbrites. The terrain around the mountain is partially covered by alluvial sediments, debris and pumice.

Volcanism in the Central Andes began during the Jurassic. A pause in volcanism occurred between 38 and 27 million years ago; about 26 million years ago, the Farallon Plate broke up into the Cocos and Nazca Plates, volcanism resumed in the Central Andes and increased subduction of the Nazca Plate during the late Oligocene caused the volcanic arc to broaden to about 250 km. Twenty-five million years ago, the "Quechua event" triggered the uplift of the Puna-Altiplano, a highland covering a surface area of 500,000 km^{2} and reaching an altitude of 3,700 m. In the late Miocene–Pliocene a phase of strong ignimbrite volcanism occurred. About two million years ago, the "Diaguita deformation" was characterized by a change in the deformation regimen from crustal shortening to strike-slip faulting and of volcanism from voluminous felsic eruptions to isolated stratovolcanoes and back-arc mafic volcanism. A slowdown in the subduction may have caused this change. Nowadays most volcanism occurs at the western edge of the Puna, where volcanoes such as Lascar and Llullaillaco formed.

Volcanism in the Central Volcanic Zone may be affected by deep-seated lineaments, such as the Olacapato-El Toro and Archibarca lineaments, which control where volcanoes and geothermal systems form. They extend diagonally across the volcanic arc and are accompanied by volcanic manifestations at substantial distances from the arc. The Archibarca lineament runs from the Escondida copper deposit, over Llullaillaco (where it crosses the volcanic arc), Corrida de Cori, Archibarca, Antofalla to the Galán caldera; it influenced the development of Llullaillaco. Other faults are the northeast–southwest trending Guanaqueros and the northwest–southeast trending Imilac-Salina del Fraile; Llullaillaco formed on the trace of the latter fault.

=== Composition ===
Llullaillaco has produced dacites, which define a potassium- and aluminium-rich calc-alkaline suite. Some rocks display shoshonitic characteristics typical for lavas erupted at large distance from the trenches. Others have medium contents of potassium. Phenocrysts are mostly hornblende or pyroxene with lesser quantities of biotite and quartz; apatite, iron-titanium oxides, opaque minerals, sphene, sulfides and zircon are rare. Some phenocrysts show evidence of a complex history. Older rocks contain hematite. Elemental sulfur is found at Llullaillaco, specifically at Azufrera Esperanto; sulfur reserves are estimated to amount to 210,000 tonnes (210,000 long tons; 230,000 short tons).

Trace element data are typical for Central Volcanic Zone rocks. Rocks become more felsic the younger they are: Older rocks contain more quartz and biotite than recent ones, and display higher iron and lower alkali metal contents.

The composition may reflect magma differentiation in a solitary magma chamber, but with occasional replenishment with more primitive/ differentiated melts. Processes in the chamber such as magma mixing and crystallization of plagioclase yielded melts with homogeneous composition and low volatile concentrations that upon eruption formed viscous lava flows. A lithospheric structure probably directed magma flows over long time periods along the same pathway, and magma interacted with the crust as it ascended. The depth of the magma source probably varied over the history of the volcano. The total magma output at Llullaillaco is between 0.05 cubic kilometres per millennium (0.012 mi^{3}/ka) and 0.02 km^{3}/ka.

== Climate ==
The climate in the region is cold, dry and sunny. There are only limited climate data from Llullaillaco. Temperatures at the summit are about −15 °C (5 °F) to −13 °C (9 °F), with temperature maximums ranging from −8 °C (18 °F) in summer to −13 °C (9 °F) in winter. The temperature of the ground fluctuates strongly between day and night, and can reach 12.5 °C (54.5 °F) in summer. The climate is extremely sunny, perhaps one of the sunniest places on Earth, and UV radiation is intense. The high insolation is due to the lack of cloud cover, the high altitude, and the close coincidence between summer solstice with the day where Earth is closest to the Sun which boosts the maximum possible daily insolation.

Mean annual precipitation reaches 20–50 millimetres (0.79–1.97 in), decreasing from west to east, and is episodic to the point that it is difficult to give average values. It is most often associated with either convective activity during summer or cyclones during winter. Snowfall can occur down to altitudes of 4,000 m. The Andean Dry Diagonal, where half of the precipitation falls in summer and the other half in winter, crosses the Andes at Llullaillaco. It and the Atacama Desert owe its existence to the rainshadow effect of the Andes, air subsidence within South Pacific High, and the cold Humboldt Current off the Pacific coast. Owing to the high evaporation rates and low precipitation, the soils at Llullaillaco are among the driest on Earth.

The climate has not always been uniformly dry. Between 14,000 and 9,500 years ago during the late glacial, a wet period gave rise to lakes in the Altiplano (Lake Tauca pluvial). Water discharge from Llullaillaco and neighbouring mountains into Salar de Punta Negra increased, leading to the formation of standing water bodies. As glaciers retreated between 15,000 and 10,000 years ago, lakes shrank. Climate was extremely dry between 9,000 and 4,000 years ago and temperatures warmer than today during the early Holocene (Holocene Climatic Optimum). Deposits in Quebrada de las Zorritas valley indicate that between 2,500 and 1,600 years before present runoff was more intense.

== Snow and glaciers ==
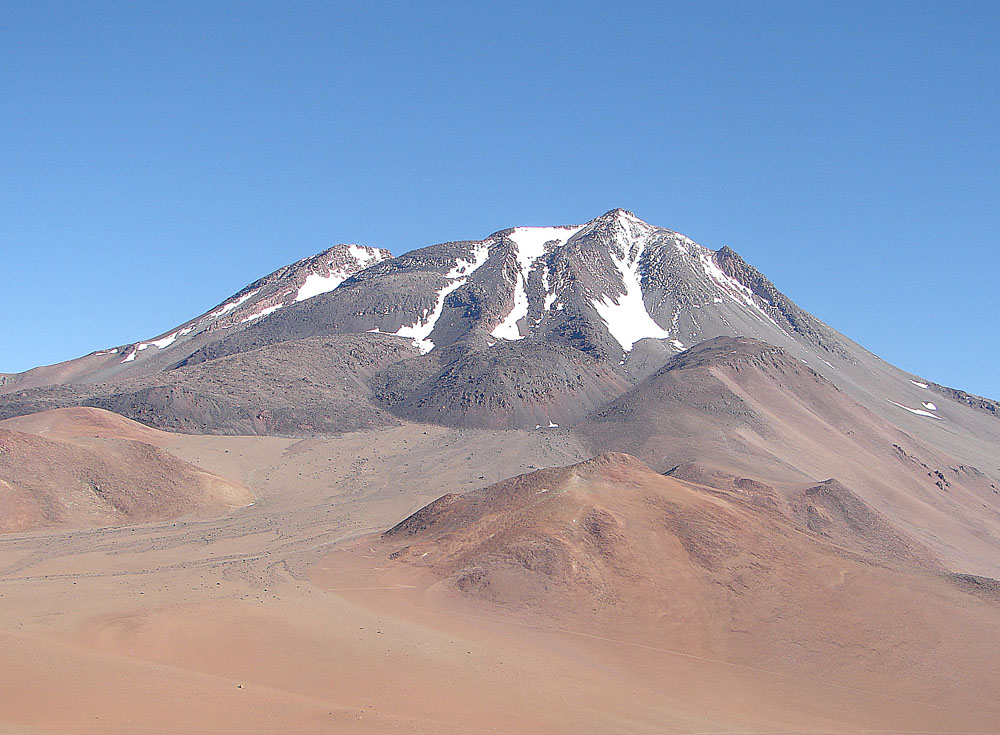
Snow patches on Llullaillaco

It is not clear whether there are glaciers on Llullaillaco—some sources contend that there are no glaciers on Llullaillaco, which would make it the highest mountain in the world without one, while others state that there are small glaciers above 6,000 m altitude, four permanent snowpatches of glaciers on the northeastern and southern flanks, or a single 0.55 km^{2} (as of 2002) glacier above 6,500 m elevation. In 2006 the General Water Directorate of Chile stated that there were seven separate ice bodies on the mountain, all on the northwestern side. An ice slab was reported in 1958 on the western slope between 5,600–6,500 m elevation, but it is not a glacier. The lack of glaciers is a consequence of the dry climate, as the high insolation and dry air cause all snow to evaporate before it can form glaciers.

However, Llullaillaco has permanent snow fields in protected niches, which are not large enough to give rise to glaciers. One-to-1.5-metre-high penitentes occur above 5,000 m altitude, especially in more sheltered areas and around the old crater. The snowline lies at 5,400–5,800 m elevation. Temporary snow cover also occurs after precipitation events, but it disappears quickly in the sun. The snow and icefields on Llullaillaco reach thicknesses of 7–10 metres (23–33 ft) and supply water to the Salar de Punta Negra.

The occurrence of past glaciation at Llullaillaco and its neighbours during the Pleistocene is also uncertain. Some traces of past glacier activity are found in the summit area; cirques may have existed on the northwestern slope, where glaciers may have descended to 5,100 m elevation, and a moraine girdle may have formed at 4,900 m elevation. There is evidence of glacial landforms destroyed by lava and volcanic mudflows. It was once believed that Llullaillaco had experienced three large glaciations, but the "moraines" are actually mudflow/volcanic deposits. Some landforms indicate that any glaciation occurred before the Last Glacial Maximum. Even when temperatures decreased during the Last Glacial Maximum, the climate at Llullaillaco may have been too dry to permit glacier development. If any glacier expansion took place, it was during the late glacial when the climate was moister.

Periglacial phenomena are observed on Llullaillaco, commencing at 4,300 m altitude and reaching their maximum around 5,100–5,400 m on the Chilean and 5,350–5,700 m on the Argentine side. They are solifluction surfaces, cryoplanation surfaces, block ramparts, and patterned ground. Permafrost is found at higher altitudes and is connected to the snowfields. Cryoplanation and solifluction landforms are also observed on Iris and Mitral. The landforms probably developed during past periods where the climate was more humid.

== Flora and fauna ==
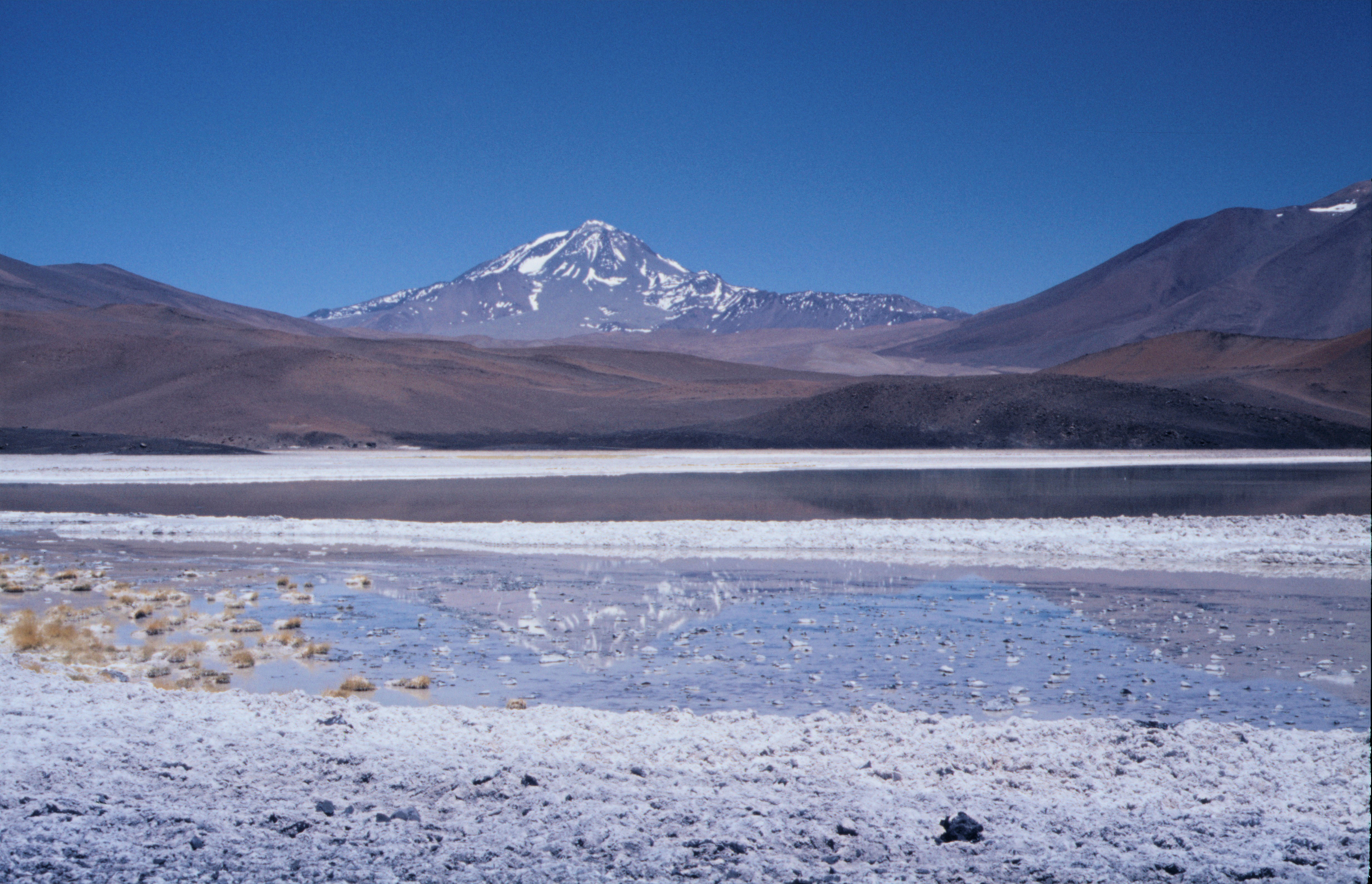
Llullaillaco from Salar Rio Grande

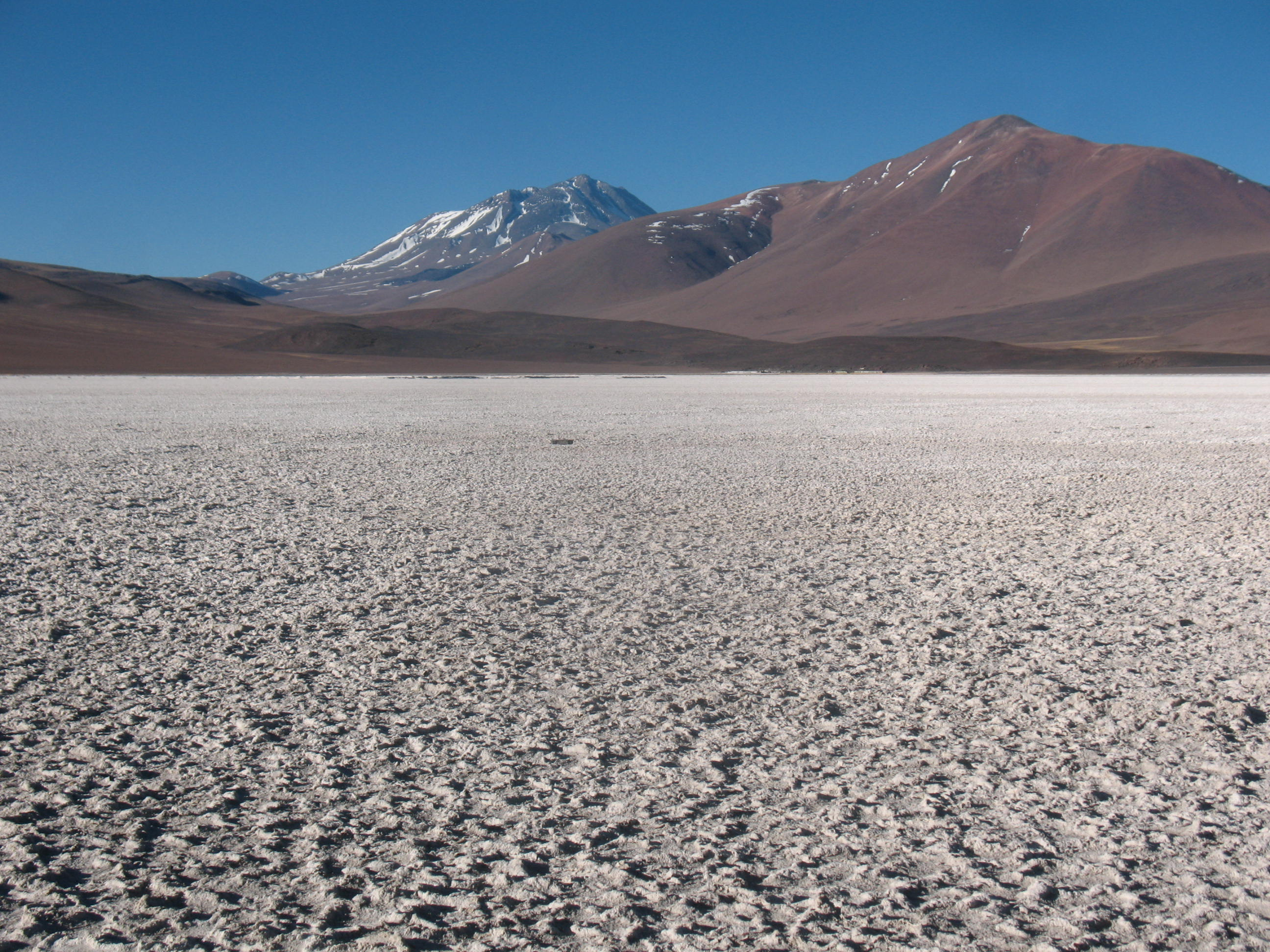
Llullaillaco from Salar de Aguas Calientes IV

Vegetation is scarce in the arid climate, especially below 3,700–3,800 m altitude where precipitation is too low to permit vegetation development. It takes the form of a steppe, with sparse cushion plants and shrubs. Acantholippia punensis, Atriplex imbricata, and Cristaria andicola are the first plants that grow above this elevation. They are joined at 3,900 m altitude by Stipa frigida which can be found up to 4,910 m of altitude. The maximum vegetation density is found around 4,250 m with 12% of the surface. At this altitude, Adesmia spinosissima, Fabiana bryoides, Mulinum crassifolium, and Parastrephia quadrangularis are found in addition to the previously mentioned plants. Above this altitude, plant cover decreases again, probably due to low temperatures, and disappears above 5,000 m elevation; most of the volcano lies above this line. Deyeuxia curvula, Distichia muscoides and Oxychloe andina form wetlands (bofedales) in valleys.

The fauna is represented by deer, guanacos, vicuñas and vizcachas. Especially around waterbodies are birds like ducks, flamingos and rheas. Most animals do not reach altitudes above 4,600 m. A scorpion species (Brachistosternus llullaillaco) is named after the volcano. There seems to be a population of the Punta de Vacas leaf-eared mouse on Llullaillaco; it likely is the highest-elevation permanent population of any known vertebrate species.

Lichens grow on rocks. Algae, including snow algae and cyanobacteria, live on the penitentes, sometimes forming coloured patches, and algae and microbial mats grow in Lago Llullaillaco. A species of bacterium (Subtercola vilae) was discovered in the lake. The microorganisms in the lake resemble these of other Central Andean lakes, such as Aguas Calientes and Lake Licancabur, in some ways and differ in others. Species-poor fungal and bacterial communities have been found in the soils (more precisely: tephra) of Llullaillaco, with the fungus Naganishia friedmanii being the most common species. The soils are extremely poor in organic matter and have simple ecological communities. They have to survive environmental conditions among the most extreme on the planet, with aridity, strong UV radiation, daily freeze-thaw cycles and a lack of nutrients. Life may depend on unusual food sources like gaseous carbon monoxide or organic material (e.g remains of plants) transported to the mountain by winds, while photosynthetic organisms are limited to sites with higher water availability.

The area of Llullaillaco is part of the Llullaillaco National Park, a Chilean protected area created in 1995 and named after the mountain. Air pollution from the Escondida copper mine may reach Llullaillaco and threaten ecosystems there.

== Archaeology ==
Archaeological sites on mountains are widespread in the Andes, with forty mountains featuring sites in Salta Province alone. In the 1950s several archaeological sites were discovered on Llullaillaco. The initial discovery was in 1952; further expeditions took place during the second half of the 20th century. Some sites were looted after their discovery.

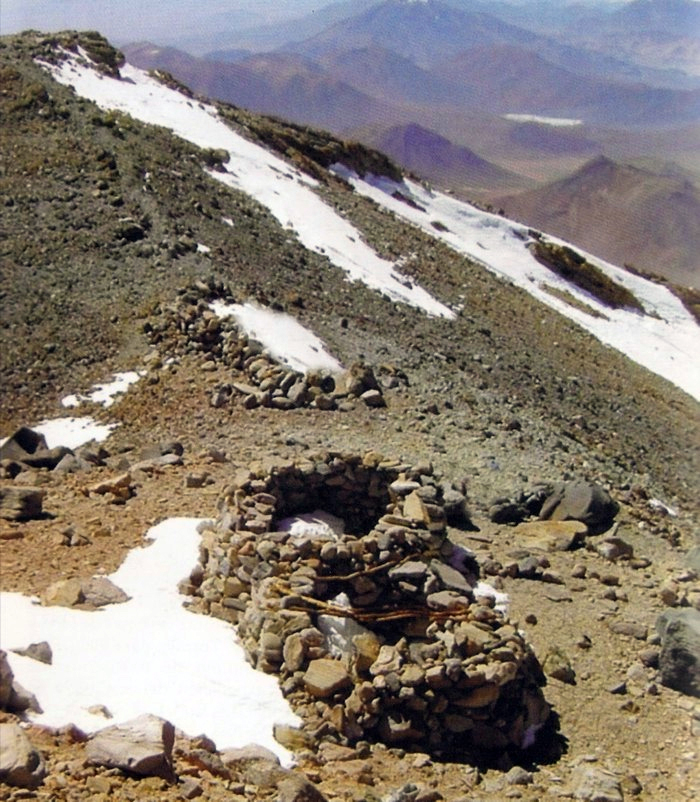
Archeological site at the top of Llullaillaco

Three Inca roads come to Llullaillaco from Salar de Llullaillaco, Salar de Punta Negra and Socompa, and meet at a tambo (inn) at an altitude of 5,200 m on the northeastern flank. The tambo consists of numerous buildings; it was probably a base camp for ascents and was temporarily inhabited. On the road from Salar de Llullaillaco is a cemetery, where 16 bodies were found in 1972. The cemetery may host the bodies of people killed in the construction of the Llullaillaco archaeological sites. Half-destroyed walls form a building complex, which was built on terraces and partly buried by loose debris from the mountain above. Two water sites lie between the cemetery and the tambo.

An Inca ceremonial path begins at the tambo and leads up the volcano. It is 1.5–2 m wide (narrower in steeper reaches) and marked by wooden posts and cairns, probably for the case that the path is covered in snow. It continues past two waystations at 5,600 m and 6,300 m elevation, which consist of small buildings and protecting walls. At 6,500 m altitude, the path splits at the so-called "Portezuelo del Inca". One continues to the summit, the other to a plateau at 6,715 m elevation. Another set of protecting walls and small buildings form another waystation at 6,550 m elevation. Two enclosures and a 11 m × 6 m platform are on the plateau, forming the second-highest archaeological site on Earth after a site only a few metres higher on Cerro Mercedario.

The Inca roads connect with the major north–south Inca road that runs between San Pedro de Atacama and Copiapo. Infrastructure such as road markers, shelters and tambos are found along the road close to Llullaillaco. The paths on Llullaillaco are not simple footpaths but equipped with retaining walls, delimited edges and staircases (above "Portezuelo del Inca"). They were built by the Inca, their construction methods perhaps reflecting Inca mythology. They were discovered by Mathias Rebitsch in 1958.

Llullaillaco appears to have been the most important Inca sacred mountain in the region and possibly all of the Central Andes, and the complex of archaeological sites is one of the most significant in the Andes. In the case of Llullaillaco, they may have been sites of pilgrimage used by the local Atacama people during Inca rule (Note: Such religious ceremonies played an important role in the development of the empire.), no evidence of pre-Inca activity has been found. About forty-five structures have been identified at Llullaillaco, distributed across several sites and with clear architectonic differences, implying not all of them were built by the state. Among the structures are stone circles and roofed buildings. Archeological sites are also found in the valleys that drain Llullaillaco towards the Salar de Punta Negra, including the Quebrada Llullaillaco and the Quebrada de las Zorritas where the Inca paths ascend the mountain. The complex of archaeological sites has become subject of scientific research.

Because of the findings, the summit area of the volcano in 2001 was classified as a Lugar Histórico Nacional by the government of Argentina, and on 24 June 2014 the entire Llullaillaco complex was declared a World Heritage Site by UNESCO. There are myths associated with Llullaillaco, and the mountain is still important to the inhabitants of Socaire east of the Salar de Atacama, from where it is visible. Some ascents are done for ritual reasons.

=== Children of Llullaillaco ===
In March 1999, excavations of the platform by a team of archaeologists led by Johan Reinhard, found three mummies of children buried at 1.7 m depth in partially natural, partially excavated pits. They were a 7-year-old boy, a 6-year-old girl and a 15-year-old girl (later research has suggested lower ages for all three), which are known as "El Niño", "La Niña del Rayo" and "La Doncella", respectively. They were found clothed and in a seated position and were ostensibly human sacrifices offered to the gods of the Incan pantheon on mountaintops. It is not clear how they were killed; most likely, they were suffocated or buried alive but unconscious, and the boy may have been dead before reaching the summit. The younger children bore traces of cranial deformation. The Llullaillaco bodies are among the best preserved known pre-Columbian mummies owing to the cold, dry and oxygen-poor conditions of the summit which prevent microbial decay of the bodies—except for the youngest mummy, which had been damaged by lightning.

Inca human sacrifices were initiated for various reasons, either to mark particular events such as the death of an Inca Emperor, to appease nature during natural disasters or to secure resources from the mountain gods. The chosen sacrifices were children, as the gods were thought to prefer pure offerings, preferably children with unblemished bodies and virgin girls. According to historical sources and analyses of the mummies, the children came from families with high social standing and were well nourished. They were brought to mountains thousands of kilometres away and killed at the top.

Other archaeological objects found along with the mummies included: bags made out of leather, headdresses with feathers, pottery (cooking instruments like jars, plates, pots and vases), statues representing both people (male and female) and animals made out of gold, silver or Spondylus (oyster) shells, shoes and textiles, wooden and woollen vessels. The vessels and bags contained coca leaves, hairs and human nails. A total of 145 objects were found together with the mummies. Radiocarbon dating has yielded a date of death of 1430–1520 AD for one of the mummies.

Their discovery drew interest among specialists and the public, and has been cited as a cause for increased tourism to the mountain and increased attention dedicated to native people issues in the region. In 2003 the mummies were at the Catholic University of Salta, before being transferred to the Museum of High Altitude Archaeology of Argentina in 2007, which had been built to host these mummies. (Note: Other archaeological objects found at Llullaillaco are in the archaeological museum of San Pedro de Atacama in Chile.) They are kept under special storage conditions to prevent damage. The bodies found at Llullaillaco—both the mummies on the summit and these in the cemetery—have been subject to various scientific analyses. The placement of the mummies in museums led to lengthy disputes with organizations advocating the rights of indigenous people.

== Eruption history ==
The volcano developed in two stages, Llullaillaco I and Llullaillaco II. The first stage originated from two centres (Llullaillaco and Azufrera Esperanto) developed in a north–south line, producing up to 20-kilometre-long lava flows and lava domes in their summit regions. The cones and associated lava flows are heavily eroded by glaciation and hydrothermal alteration and buried by more recent volcanic rocks, but still make up about 70% of the surface of the volcano especially in its western sector. The former crater of Llullaillaco forms a plateau at 5,600–6,100 m elevation. At the 5,561 m high Azufrera Esperanto mountain 5 km north of Llullaillaco little original volcanic substance is preserved. Erosion has exposed deeply altered whiteish rock there. Llullaillaco II on the southern and northeastern flank is better preserved; the toes of the lava flows reach thicknesses of 500 m. Its lava flows are less extensive than the ones of Llullaillaco I. Pyroclastic flow deposits with a composition similar to Llullaillaco II are found on the southern slope of the volcano and may have formed before the lava eruptions began.

An older unit is formed by ignimbrites and pyroclastic flows. Older lava flows extend west from the volcano and are partly buried by sediments closer to the edifice. The landslide probably took place during an eruption. An explosive eruption of Llullaillaco II produced a 3 km long deposit of lava blocks and pyroclastic pumice, with fallout reaching Cerro Rosado. It is possible that some lava flows interacted with glaciers, causing them to melt, and volcanic rocks overran glacial and periglacial landforms.

The oldest-dated rocks at Llullaillaco were erupted 1.5 ± 0.4 million years ago, forming a lava flow northwest of Llullaillaco's main edifice. Llullaillaco I is of early Pleistocene age, but the time of the transition between Llullaillaco I and Llullaillaco II is unclear: Either it took place 450,000 years ago, or less than 41,000 ± 1,000 years ago. Ages of 5,600 ± 250 years have been obtained for Llullaillaco II rocks recovered at an altitude of over 6,000 m. The young-looking lava flows were at first thought to be of Holocene age, but dating methods yielded ages of less than one million years (potassium–argon dating) for the northern flow, 48,000 ± 12,000 years (argon–argon dating) on the southwestern flow and 930 ± 140 years (surface exposure dating) on a different flow.

=== Historical activity and hazards ===
Llullaillaco has been active in historical time, making it the highest historically active volcano on Earth. Three eruptions were recorded during the 19th century, which were, however, not directly observed and are unconfirmed:

- A small explosive eruption took place in February 1854.
- In September 1868, (according to a 1899 report) large fissures opened on its slopes and lava flowed out of the volcano.
- The May 1877 eruption has been described as an explosive eruption or as the emission of smoke. It may have been a flank eruption triggered by the 1877 Iquique earthquake.

Activity was probably limited to the emission of steam and ash, given the presence of the archaeological sites. Other reports mention eruptions in 1920, 1931, 1936 and 1960.

According to anecdotes recorded in the 19th century, the mountain occasionally smoked, including during the mapping of the Chile-Argentina border on 5 May 1879. Allegedly palaeontologist and zoologist Rodolfo Amando Philippi saw the mountain smoke in 1854, but Philippi's own report makes no mention of smoke.

The volcano is currently considered dormant and there are no known fumaroles, but Lago Llullaillaco and some ice on the volcano bear traces of geothermal heating. There are warm springs around Salar de Llullaillaco. Llullaillaco is classified as being mid-range in terms of dangerousness to Argentina, being its 16th-most-dangerous volcano in a list of 38. Future eruptive activity may result in the emission of pyroclastic flows and lava flows and may cause sector collapses, although they would be a small danger to life or property, given that the area is sparsely inhabited and largely devoid of economic activity.

== Climbing and access ==
The easiest ascent is along the former Inca route on the northeastern flank of the mountain, which can be reached from Chile. The intense UV radiation, lack of oxygen, blizzards, hypothermia and lightning are common hazards at Llullaillaco. There are reports of landmines in the area; the mines were removed in 2006 thanks to a multinational effort. A new base camp was inaugurated in 2020.

The volcano can be reached from Argentina via Tolar Grande. Access from Chile is through roads which from Chile Route 5, Socompa Pass, Taltal or Toconao lead to Salar de Punta Negra. From there, a road leads to Llullaillaco. It splits at Aguada de las Zorritas in three: One road ends close to a mountain pass north of Llullaillaco, a second ends at Azufrera Esperanto and the third rounds the volcano from southwest, crossing into Argentina south of Llullaillaco. According to John Biggar, some roads are dead ends. Two ascent routes with camps lead from Chile and Argentina to the summit.

The first known ascent by Westerners was by the Chileans Bion González and Juan Harsheim in 1952 but the indigenous people had ascended it long before. The volcano is the highest mountain with proven prehistoric ascents and demonstrates that high altitudes were no obstacle to indigenous people in the Americas, who also built on mountains with primitive technology.

== See also ==
- List of volcanoes in Chile
- List of volcanoes in Argentina
- List of Andean peaks with known pre-Columbian ascents
- List of volcanoes by elevation
