= Eupithecia sibylla =

Scientific classification
- Kingdom: Animalia
- Phylum: Arthropoda
- Class: Insecta
- Order: Lepidoptera
- Family: Geometridae
- Genus: Eupithecia
- Species: E. sibylla

Binomial name
- Eupithecia sibylla Butler, 1882

Synonyms
- Tephroclystia praelongata Warren, 1900; Eupithecia davisi Vojnits, 1985

Species of moth

Eupithecia sibylla is a moth in the family Geometridae. It is found in the regions of Los Gatos (Osomo Province), Antofagasta (Antofagasta Province), Atacama (Chanaral and Huasco provinces), Coquimbo (El Qui, Limari, and Choapa provinces), Valparaiso (Petorca and Los Andes provinces), Santiago (Santiago Province), O'Higgins (Cachapoal Province), Maule (Curico, Talca, and Linares provinces) and Biobio (Nuble Province) in Chile. The habitat consists of the Northern Desert, Northern Coast, Intermediate Desert, Coquimban Desert, Central Andean Cordillera, Central Valley, Valdivian Forest and the Northern Valdivian Forest biotic provinces.

The length of the forewings is about 7–8.5 mm for males and 7–10.5 mm for females.
