= Salar de Aguas Calientes IV =

Salt pan in Chile

Coordinates: 25°S 68.6333333°W

Designations

Ramsar Wetland
- Official name: Salar de Aguas Calientes IV
- Designated: 14 August 2009
- Reference no.: 1870

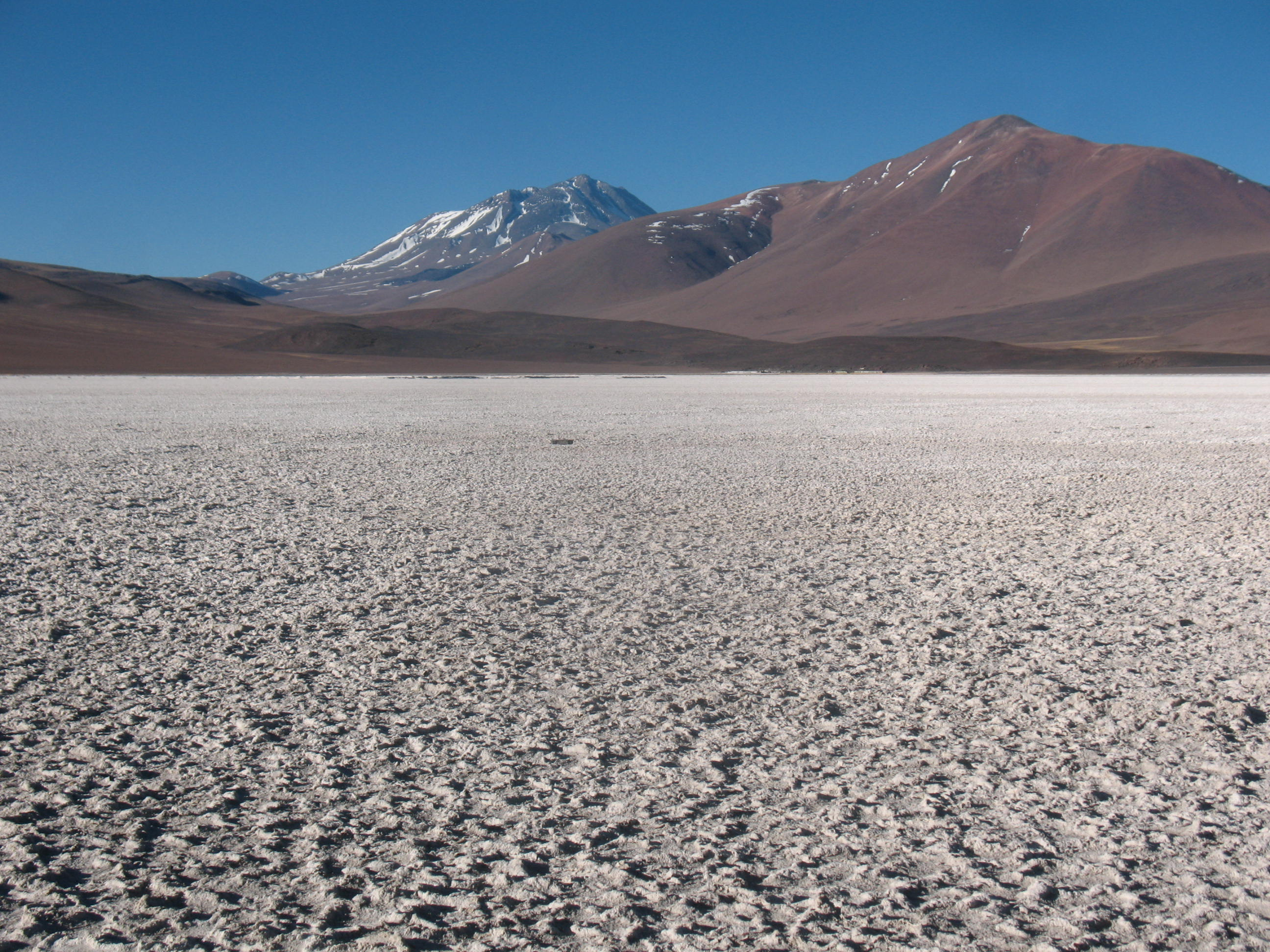
Llullaillaco in the distance

Salar de Aguas Calientes IV is a salt pan in Chile. It is adjacent to the Llullaillaco National Park and is within the Central Andean dry puna ecoregion. Its drainage basin area is 536 km^{2} (207 sq mi).

The site is significant as a staging area for sandpiper species and other long-distance migratory birds. Three species of flamingos (Chilean flamingo, Andean flamingo and James's flamingo) can be found here.

== See also ==
- Salar de Aguas Calientes
