= Taltal Wind Farm =

Wind energy project in northern Chile

Taltal wind farm
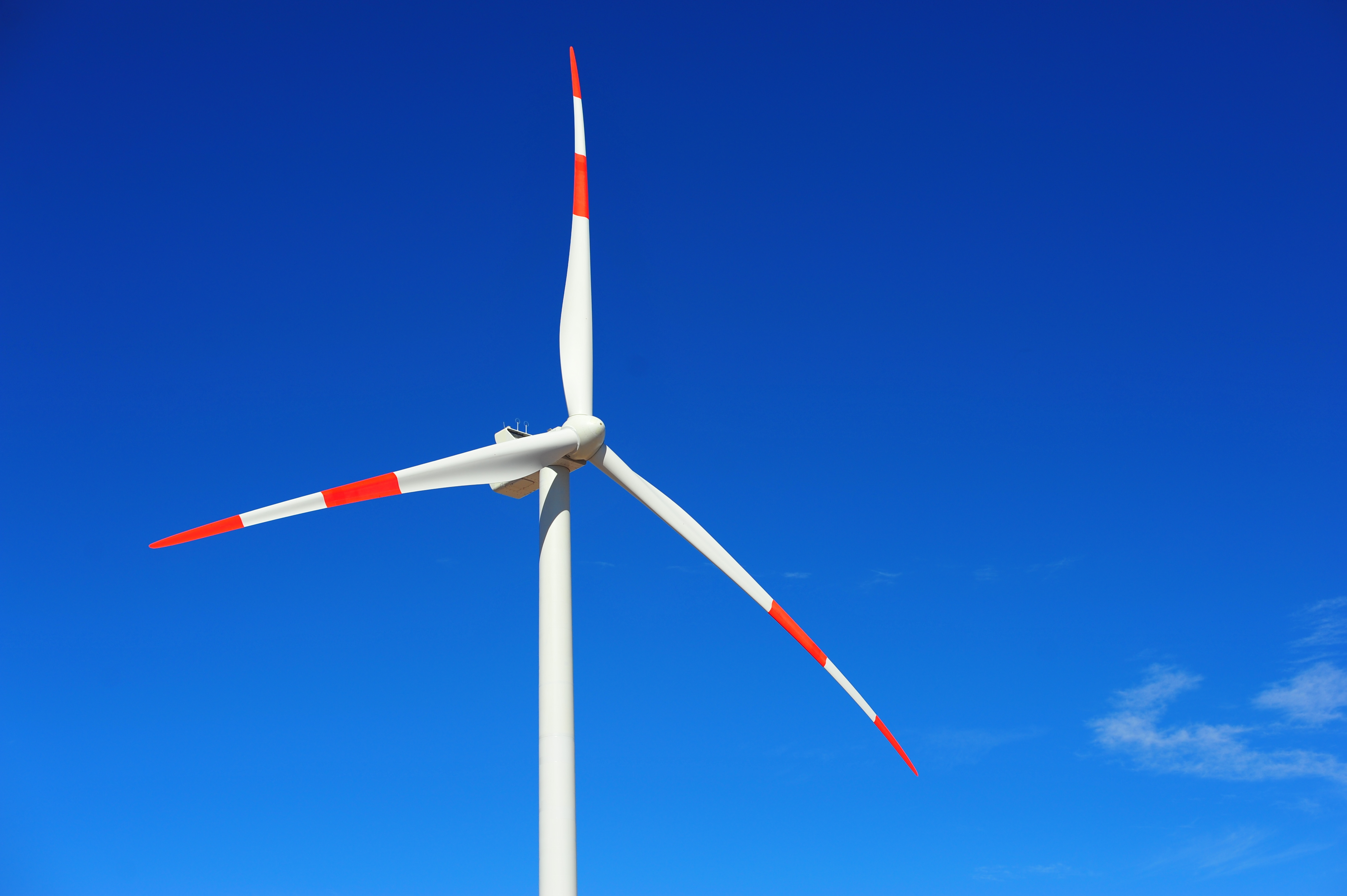
- Country: Chile
- Location: Near Taltal, Antofagasta
- Coordinates: 25.05°S 69.51°W
- Status: Under construction
- Commission date: 2014; 11 years ago
- Owner: Enel Green Power
- Operator: Enel Green Power Chile

Wind farm
- Type: Onshore

Power generation
- Make and model: Vestas V112
- Units under const.: 33
- Nameplate capacity: 99 MW
- Annual net output: 300 GWh

External links
- Commons: Related media on Commons

The Taltal wind farm is a wind energy project in northern Chile. The farm is named after the commune of Taltal, where the project is located, in the region of Antofagasta, 1,550 km (960 mi) north of Santiago. The plant's connection to the Chilean electricity grid was reported on 5 December 2014. The name "Taltal" came from the indigenous word Thalthal, which means "night bird".

== Details ==
The Taltal wind has 33 V112 wind turbines of 3 MW each, for a total installed capacity of 99 MW, 9 MW more than the Talinay wind farm in the region of Coquimbo, also in the north of Chile. The total investment for the construction of the new wind farm is approximately $190 million US dollars.

The project is supported by a 20-year power purchase agreement (PPA). The energy generated by the wind farm is delivered to the Chilean central region transmission network / SIC (Sistema Interconectado Central), through the Paposo substation, 50 km away from the plant. The plant has the capacity to generate 300 GWh a year, preventing 200,000 tons of CO_{2} emissions annually and providing enough electricity to meet the power needs of 170,000 Chilean households.

== Purpose ==
Projects like the Taltal wind farm and others of this kind, jointly organized by the Ministry of National Assets and the Ministry of Energy, aim to diversify the Chilean energy matrix, promoting the development of renewable energy to reduce carbon emissions and energy dependency from abroad, as well as enhancing power supply to support the country’s development and economic growth.

== See also ==
- Antofagasta
- Atacama Desert
- Talinay wind farm
- Taltal
