= Franke mine =

Copper mine in Antofagasta Region, Chile

Franke
- Location within Antofagasta Region Location within Chile
- Location: Taltal, Antofagasta Region, Chile; 25°49′22.45″S 69°52′3.39″W
- Products: Copper
- Company: Grupo Minero Las Cenizas

Franke (Spanish: Faena Franke) is an open-pit copper mine located in the Atacama Desert of northern Chile. More precisely it lies about 75 km southeast of the port of Taltal at an altitude of about 1,730 meters above sea level in southernmost Antofagasta Region. It is owned and operated by Grupo Minero Las Cenizas, a medium-scale Chilean mining company, since 2022 when KGHM Polska Miedź sold it. Grupo Minero Las Cenizas claims to process a monthly average of 334,000 tons of ore with average grades of 0.65% copper at Franke mine.

In the 20th century, and prior to the establishment of the modern mine, the mine site was exploited by artisan miners known as pirquineros.
