= Talinay Wind Farm =

Wind farm in Chile

- Country: Chile
- Location: Near Ovalle, Coquimbo
- Coordinates: 30°50′15″S 71°35′36″W
- Status: Operational
- Commission date: June 2013; 13 years ago
- Owner: Enel Green Power

Wind farm
- Type: Onshore

Power generation
- Units operational: 45 x 2 MW
- Make and model: Vestas
- Nameplate capacity: 90 MW
- Annual net output: 200 GWh

Talinay Wind Farm, also known by its official name of Parque Eolico Talinay, is a wind farm in northern Chile, located in the region of Coquimbo near the city of Ovalle. It has an installed capacity of 90 MW and is capable of generating about 200 GWh annually, which is set to be expanded to 500 MW in the future, with a second wind park Parque Eolico Talinay II adding a further 500 MW.

== Details ==
Located in the province of Limarí, in the region of Coquimbo, Chile, the plant was designed and developed by Vestas, and bought and managed by ENEL Green Power. It features 45 wind turbines, a mix of V90 and V100 2 MW turbines, with an installed capacity of 90 MW. It is capable of generating about 200 million kWh a year.

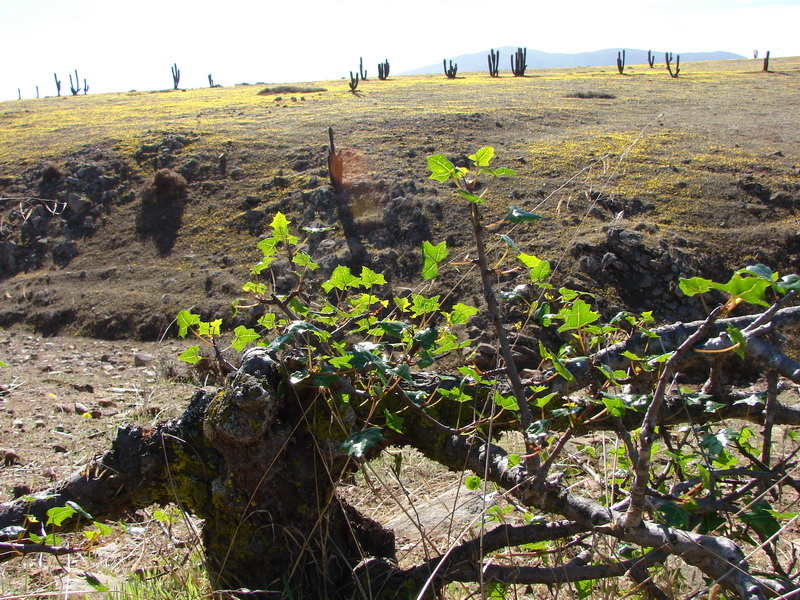
Talinay area landscape

It was constructed in a short time frame of 6 months with almost 400 people working on site during the busiest period, and set speed of construction records. The farm was connected to the grid in March 2013. The energy generated will be delivered to the Chilean central region transmission network / SIC (Sistema Interconectado Central). Talinay wind farm is the first stage in a project that plans to generate 500 MW of power provided by 167 wind turbines. Environmental Impact Studies are being held by the authorities for the second stage of the project, called Talinay II.

== Purpose ==
Projects like the Talinay wind farm, jointly organized by the Ministry of National Assets and the Ministry of Energy, aim to diversify the Chilean energy matrix, promoting the development of renewable energy to reduce carbon emissions and energy dependency from abroad, as well as enhancing power supply to support the country’s development and economic growth.

It is expected that Chilean electricity consumption will increase by 6%-7% by 2020 and this project also forms part of Chile’s 2012-2030 National Energy Strategy to increase energy production.

== See also ==
- Coquimbo
- Limarí Province
- Ovalle
- Taltal wind farm
