= Totoral Wind Farm =

Wind farm in Chile

Coordinates: 31.323°S 71.594°W

Totoral Wind Farm is a 46 MW wind farm in Chile. SN Power opened its first wind farm Totoral Wind Farm in the Coquimbo Region, 300 km (190 mi) north of Santiago de Chile on 20 January 2010 (15 years ago). The wind farm consist of 23 Vestas V90-2MW (120 m (390 ft) tower) wind turbines and is expected to deliver 100–110 GWh per year. The construction cost was 140 million US$ and revenue is expected to be about 1/10 of construction costs, but is uncertain as production and power prices is variable and it is still uncertain whether the project will be CDM-approved.

The president of Chile Michelle Bachelet and the Norwegian state secretary Sigrid Hjørnegård from the Norwegian Ministry of Petroleum and Energy opened the wind farm. At the time of opening it was the largest wind farm in Chile.
