= Socompa Pass =

Andean mountain pass

- Interactive map of Socompa Pass
- Elevation: 3,876 metres (12,717 ft)

Third Approach
- Location: Argentina–Chile border
- Range: Andes
- Coordinates: 24°27′S 68°18′W

Socompa Pass (Spanish: Paso Socompa) is an Andean mountain pass that connects the Antofagasta Region of Chile with the Argentine province of Salta, in the Los Andes Department for freight traffic by rail.

Socompa Pass, at 3,876 meters above sea level, is located at the foot of the Socompa volcano (6,031 meters). It gives way to the branch of the General Manuel Belgrano Railway on the Argentine side that connects Salta with the port of Antofagasta on the Pacific Ocean. Socomba Pass also allows passage to the Argentine side from a road in poor condition that joins Provincial Route 27 and for which only off-road vehicles are recommended. On the Chilean side, by road, the distance from the pass to Antofagasta is 306 km (190 mi).
