= Taltal =

- City and Commune
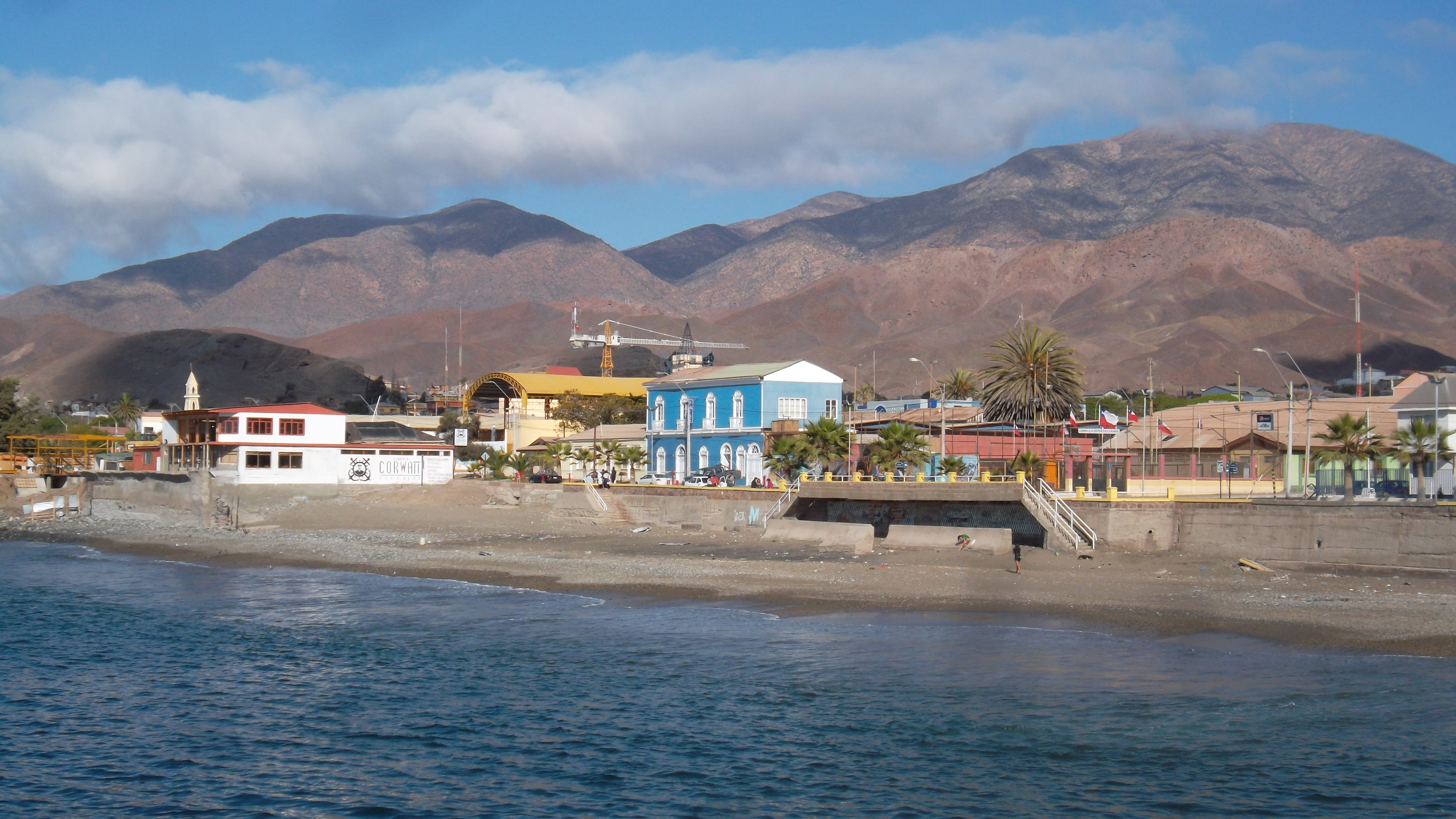

- Coat of arms Map of Taltal commune in Antofagasta Region Location in Chile
- Coordinates: 25°24′S 70°29′W
- Country: Chile
- Region: Antofagasta
- Province: Antofagasta
- Established: 12 July 1858

Government
  - Type: Municipality
  - Alcalde: Sergio Belmor Orellana Montejo (PRSD)

Area
  - Total: 20,405.1 km^{2} (7,878.5 sq mi)
- Elevation: 2,098 m (6,883 ft)

Population (2012 Census)
  - Total: 11,132
  - Density: 0.54555/km^{2} (1.4130/sq mi)
  - Urban: 9,564
  - Rural: 1,536

Sex
  - Men: 6,182
  - Women: 4,918
- Time zone: UTC−4 (CLT)
  - Summer (DST): UTC−3 (CLST)
- Area code: 56 + 55
- Website: Municipality of Taltal

Taltal is a Chilean commune and city in Antofagasta Province, Antofagasta Region. According to the 2012 census, the commune has a population of 11,132 and has an area of 20,405.1 km^{2} (7,878 sq mi). The commune is home to Paranal Observatory and includes the northern portion of Pan de Azúcar National Park.

The commune of Taltal hosts multiple copper mines including Franke, Altamira and Las Luces; all operated and owned by Grupo Minero Las Cenizas.

== Etymology ==
It has been claimed the etymological origin of the name is the Mapuche word Thalthal, which means “night bird.” This would make it one of the northernmost Mapuche toponyms in Chile.

== History ==
The Atacama border dispute between Bolivia and Chile (1825-1879)

The history of Taltal begins with the opening of the copper mine "El Cobre" by José Antonio Moreno in 1850 about 20 kilometers north of Taltal. This brought miners and prospectors to the area. In 1855 Moreno expanded his operations to include Taltal. The discovery of copper in 1858 on nearby Mount Cachiyuyal increased pressure on the port, which had to utilize customs officials from Copiapo. So Moreno requested official recognition of the port which was granted by decree on 12 July 1858.

However, the real boom began in 1876 with the opening of nitrate mines, in particular potassium nitrate. In 1879, the first nitrates were shipped from the area. In 1882 a railway was completed from Cachinal de la Sierra and other nitrate mining sites. It was built by the "Taltal Railway Company", a British company, sold to private investors in 1954, and dismantled in 1970 due to the end of nitrate mining. At the peak of production in the 1930s, Taltal had a population of over 30,000 and was the third largest nitrate port in Chile.

On 18 June 1991, following an unusual rainfall event, a series of mudflows devastated part of the city.

== Demographics ==
According to the 2002 census of the National Statistics Institute, Taltal had 11,000 inhabitants (6,182 men and 4,918 women). Of these, 9,564 (86%) lived in urban areas and 1,536 (14%) in rural areas. The population grew by 2.3% (11,148 persons) between the 1992 and 2002 censuses.

According to data from the 2024 Census, 18.7% of Taltal's population self-identifies as belonging to the Chango indigenous people (2,262 people). This makes Taltal the municipality with the largest Chango population in the country.

== Administration ==
As a commune, Taltal is a third-level administrative division of Chile administered by a municipal council, headed by an alcalde who is directly elected every four years. The 2008-2012 alcalde is Guillermo Hidalgo Ocampo.

Within the electoral divisions of Chile, Taltal is represented in the Chamber of Deputies by Pedro Araya (PRI) and Manuel Rojas (UDI) as part of the 4th electoral district, together with Antofagasta, Mejillones and Sierra Gorda. The commune is represented in the Senate by Jorge Soria (Ind., 2018–2026) and Luz Ebensperger (UDI, 2018–2022) as part of the 2nd senatorial constituency (Antofagasta Region).

== Tourism ==
- Llullaillaco National Park is an area of 268,670 ha protected by the National Forestry Corporation (CONAF). It lies in the Andes at an altitude of between 3,000 and 6,700 meters, and includes the Llullaillaco Volcano (6,739 meters), Cerro de la Pena Mountain (5260 m) and Cerro Aguas Calientes Mountain (5,060 m). The park is home to vicuñas and guanacos, with the highest population density of these species in the region. The park is part of the protected area of the Montano Desert that lies in the Cordillera Domeyko the desert steppe and the Andean salt flats.
- Cifuncho bay, located 30 km south of Taltal. With an extensive and beautiful beach of white sand and turquoise water, it is considered one of the five most beautiful beaches in Chile.
- El Medano canyon, located 90 kilometres north of Taltal, is one of the most important sites to observe cave paintings in the northern coast of Chile. This paintings are the remains of an extinct culture called the Chango people, who drew their experiences of hunting guanacos, sea lions and whales. It is believed that the paintings are between 500 and 1,000 years old.
- Caleta Paposo is 54 km north of Taltal. It was once a mining centre and was inhabited by the pre-Hispanic Chango people. Surrounded by pastures irrigated by moisture coming off the sea, the area has a very rich flora and fauna and was once a border between Chile and Bolivia in the nineteenth century.

== Notable sites ==
- Paranal Observatory, located on Cerro Paranal in the Atacama Desert, 110 km north of the city and administered by the European Southern Observatory. Soon the commune will also be home to the E-ELT (European Extremely Large Telescope) to be located on Cerro Armazones, 20 kilometers east of Cerro Paranal. This site is not generally open to tourists; visitors are received by appointment only. However, as of 2025, weekly guided tours are given; registration in advance is required.
  - The ESO Hotel at Paranal, featured in the 2008 Bond film Quantum of Solace. This facility is used by ESO scientists and engineers. It is not a commercial hotel, and the public cannot book rooms.

== Architectural heritage ==
The city of Taltal contains many houses that are registered in the Inventory of Cultural Heritage Properties in Chile. Highlights include the Alhambra Theatre (1921), the Augusto Capdeville Museum (1885), the railroad houses (1886), the Plaza Hotel (1898), houses in the downtown area, the Catholic church (which was completely devastated by a fire in January 2007 but is now rebuilt) and the Protestant church (1896).

=== Taltal wind farm ===
The company Enel Green Power has begun the construction of the new Taltal Wind Farm, which will be located in the commune of Taltal, Chile, approximately 1,500 kilometers north of Santiago, the Chilean capital. The project will require a total investment of $190 million US dollars and will produce a total of 99 megawatts (MW). It will have 33 windmills, making it the biggest wind farm in Chile.

== Climate ==
Climate data for Refresco, elevation 1,850 m (6,070 ft)
Month	Jan	Feb	Mar	Apr	May	Jun	Jul	Aug	Sep	Oct	Nov	Dec	Year
Mean daily maximum °C (°F)	27.4 (81.3)	27.5 (81.5)	27.7 (81.9)	27.2 (81.0)	25.1 (77.2)	23.3 (73.9)	23.7 (74.7)	24.8 (76.6)	26.8 (80.2)	26.9 (80.4)	27.6 (81.7)	27.5 (81.5)	26.3 (79.3)
Daily mean °C (°F)	17.5 (63.5)	17.2 (63.0)	16.3 (61.3)	14.7 (58.5)	12.9 (55.2)	10.8 (51.4)	11.1 (52.0)	12.0 (53.6)	13.4 (56.1)	14.6 (58.3)	16.2 (61.2)	16.0 (60.8)	14.4 (57.9)
Mean daily minimum °C (°F)	7.3 (45.1)	7.1 (44.8)	7.3 (45.1)	7.0 (44.6)	5.4 (41.7)	4.1 (39.4)	4.3 (39.7)	4.7 (40.5)	5.3 (41.5)	6.0 (42.8)	6.5 (43.7)	7.0 (44.6)	6.0 (42.8)
Average precipitation mm (inches)	0.0 (0.0)	0.3 (0.01)	0.2 (0.01)	0.0 (0.0)	1.7 (0.07)	1.7 (0.07)	4.4 (0.17)	0.2 (0.01)	0.0 (0.0)	0.7 (0.03)	0.0 (0.0)	0.0 (0.0)	9.2 (0.37)
Average relative humidity (%)	54	55	53	50	48	48	46	48	45	44	44	45	48
Source: Bioclimatografia de Chile

== See also ==
- Taltal wind farm
- Paranal Observatory
- European Extremely Large Telescope
- Atacama Desert
- Cordillera Domeyko
- Antofagasta
