= Llullaillaco National Park =

National park of Chile

- IUCN category II (national park)
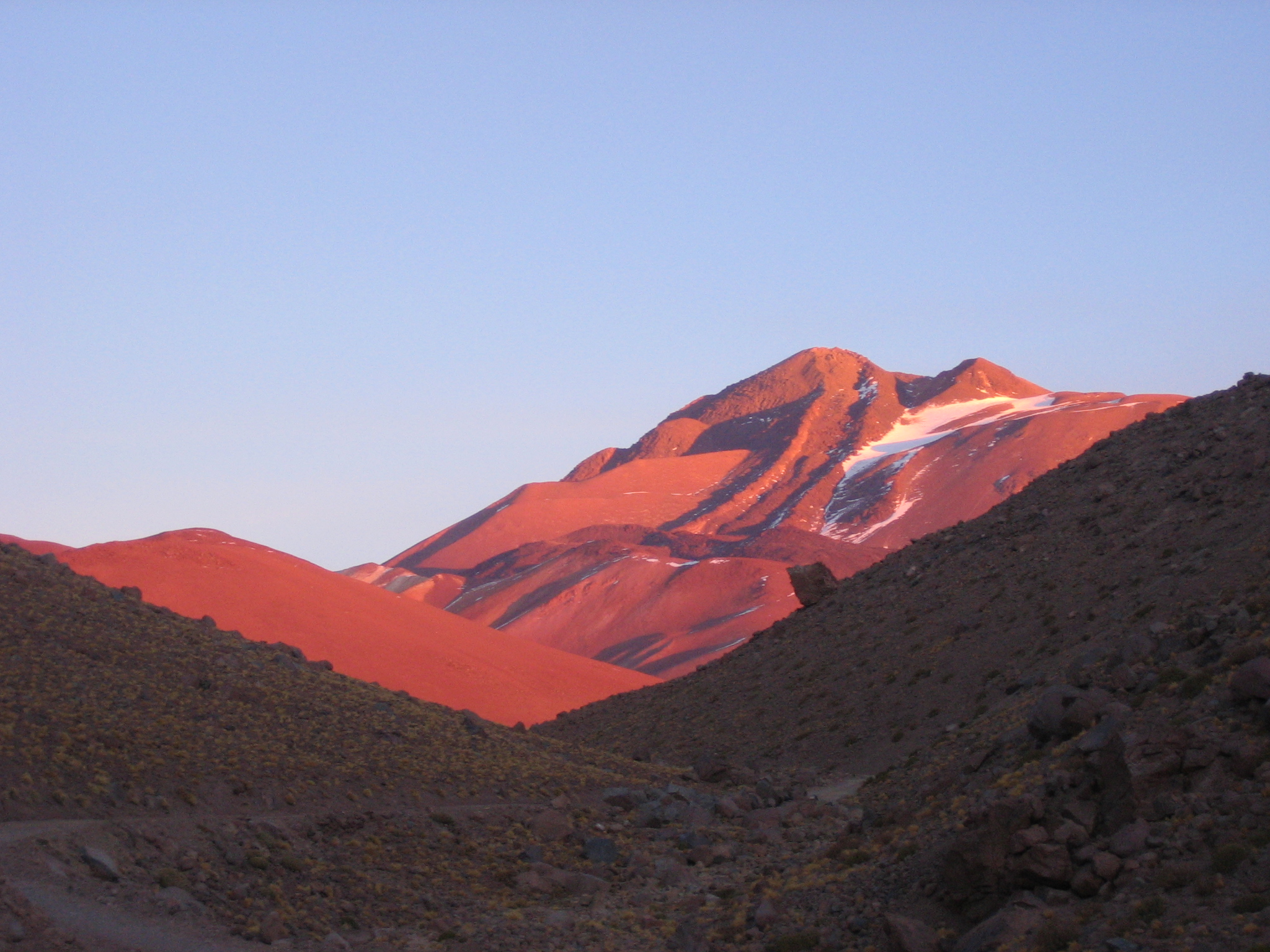
- Llullaillaco
- Interactive map of Llullaillaco National Park
- Location: Antofagasta Region, Chile
- Nearest city: Antofagasta
- Coordinates: 24°43′0″S 68°37′0″W
- Area: 2,687 km^{2} (1,037 sq mi)
- Governing body: Corporación Nacional Forestal

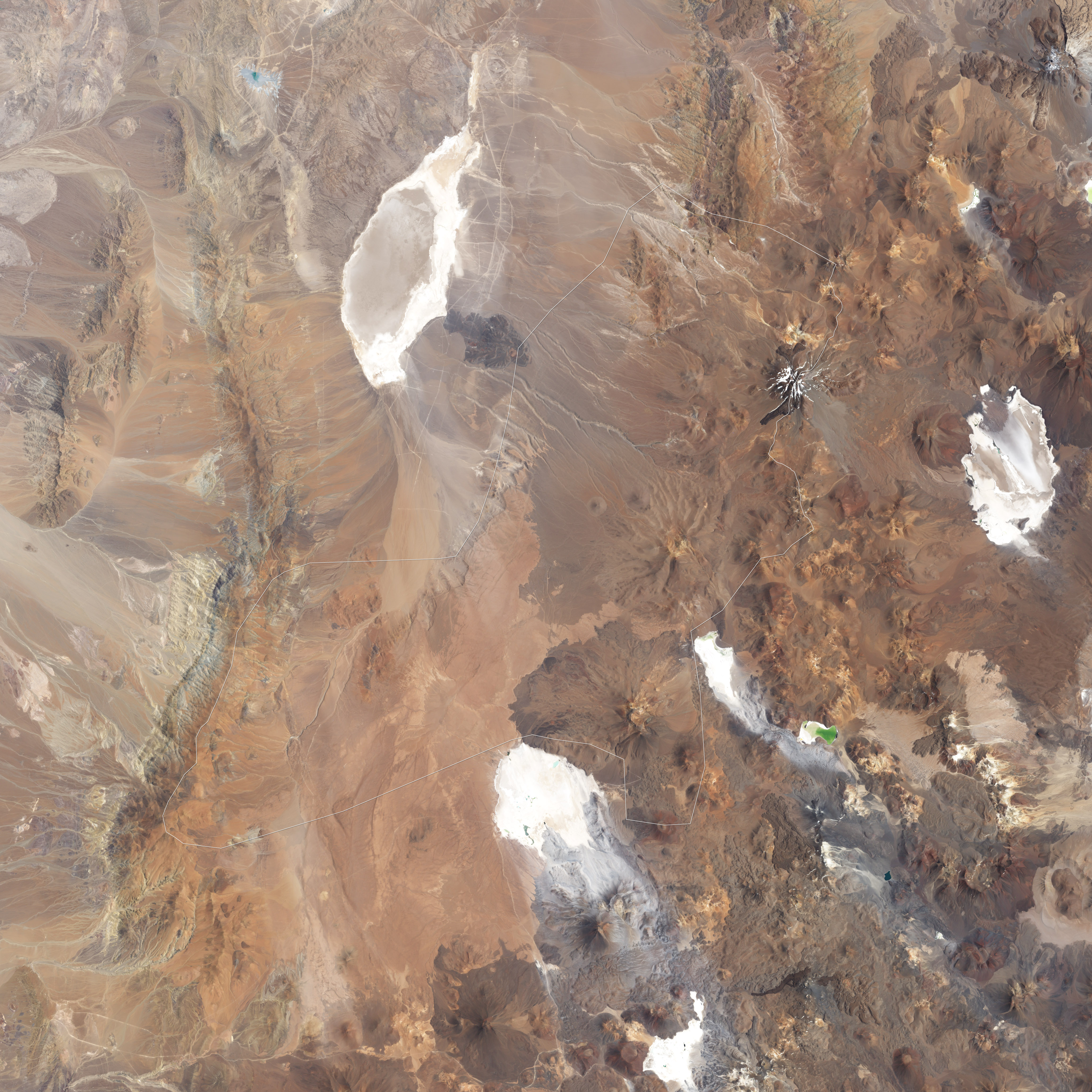
Satellite image of Parque Nacional Llullaillaco

Llullaillaco National Park is a national park of Chile, 275 km southeast of Antofagasta in the Andes. It lies between the eastern slopes of the Cordillera Domeyko and the international border with Argentina. In the park there are several important mountains that culminate at the summit of Llullaillaco volcano. The park also is characterized by extensive semi-desert plains interspersed by quebradas (ravines with running water). A part of the Inca road system is found in Río Frío area.

== Vegetation ==
The park lies within the Central Andean dry puna ecoregion. In the park have been recorded 126 flora species, 21 of which are endemic to the area.

== Access ==
To access this area, the travel must be programmed and have official permission from the CONAF (National Forest Corporation of Chile) in Antofagasta City.

Herds of vicuñas wander through the park.

== See also ==
- Llullaillaco National Park travel guide from Wikivoyage
- Media related to Llullaillaco National Park at Wikimedia Commons
