= Antofagasta Province =

Antofagasta Province Provincia de Antofagasta
- Province
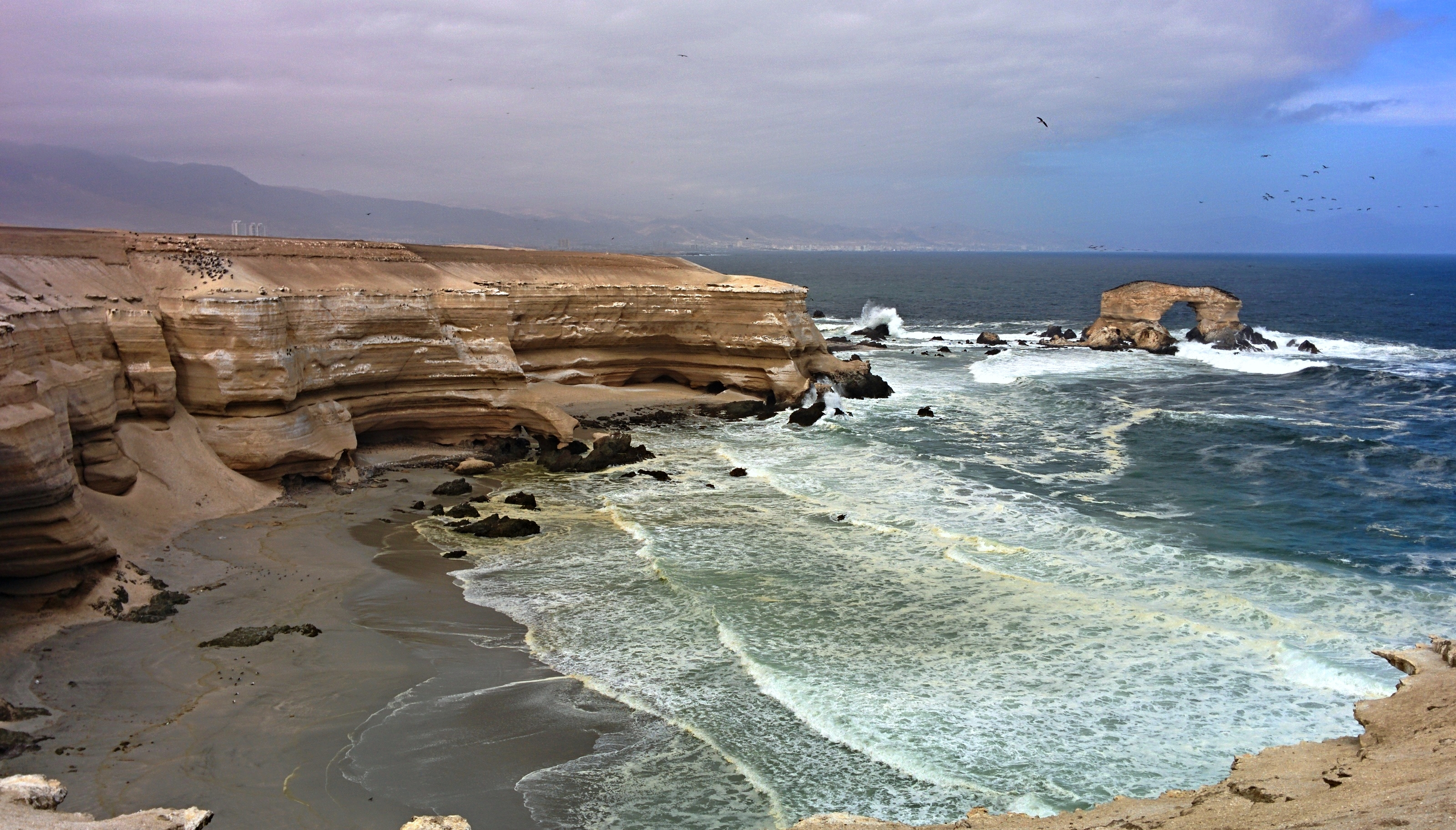
- La Portada

- Seal Location in the Antofagasta Region Location in Chile
- Coordinates: 24°37′S 69°32′W
- Country: Chile
- Region: Antofagasta
- Capital: Antofagasta
- Communes: List of 4: Antofagasta; Mejillones; Sierra Gorda; Taltal

Government
  - Type: Provincial
  - Presidential Provincial Delegate: None

Area
  - Province: 67,813.5 km^{2} (26,182.9 sq mi)

Population (2012 Census)
  - Province: 359,353
  - Rank: 1
  - Density: 5.29914/km^{2} (13.7247/sq mi)
  - Urban: 313,244
  - Rural: 5,535

Sex
  - Men: 165,847
  - Women: 152,932
- Time zone: UTC-4 (CLT)
  - Summer (DST): UTC-3 (CLST)
- Area code: 56 + 55
- Website: Government of Antofagasta

Antofagasta Province (Spanish: Provincia de Antofagasta) is one of three provinces in the northern Chilean region of Antofagasta (II). The capital is the port city of Antofagasta. Located within the Atacama Desert, it borders the El Loa and Tocopilla provinces to the north, the Pacific Ocean to the West and the Atacama Region to the south.

== History ==
Before 1866, this region was disputed and claimed by Chile and Bolivia. After the Boundary Treaty of 1866 between the two nations the province was part Bolivia, and was known as the Atacama Department, or the Litoral. The Secret Treaty of 1873 between Peru and Bolivia was followed by the Boundary Treaty of 1874 between Bolivia and Chile. Afterwards Chile defeated both Peru and Bolivia in the War of the Pacific of 1879–84. The Antofagasta region was occupied by Chile during the War and administered as the Antofagasta Territory (which was neither a province or department) until 1888, when the Antofagasta Department was created. It was officially ceded to Chile by Bolivia in 1904. Bolivia still argues that this was a forced takeover of part of a country by a stronger nation.

== Geography ==
The province spans an area of 67,813.5 km^{2} (26,183 sq mi) in the Atacama Desert. It is the second largest province in the country, second only to Antártica Chilena Province (1,265,853.7 km^{2}), which is not internationally recognized.

Its area is rich in saline and other mineral deposits with the important Caracoles silver mines about 90 miles (140 km) north-east of the Antofagasta. Like the other provinces of this region, Antofagasta produces for export copper, silver, silver ores, lead, nitrate of soda, borax and salt. Iron and manganese ores are also found here.

== Demography ==
According to the 2002 census by the National Statistics Institute, the province had a 2012 population of 359,353, and a population density of 4.7/km^{2} (12/sq mi). Of this population, 313,244 (98.3%) lived in urban areas and 5,535 (1.7%) in rural areas. Between the 1992 and 2002 censuses, the population grew by 29.1% (71,779 persons).

Besides Antofagasta, the principal towns are Taltal and Mejillones.

== Administration ==
As a province, Antofagasta is a second-level administrative division of Chile, which is further subdivided into four communes (comunas). The province is administered by a presidentially appointed regional delegate. Government headquarters, before the suppression of provincial governments, were located at Arturo Prat N° 384, Piso 6, Antofagasta.

| Commune | Area (km^{2}) | 2002 Population | Density (km^{2}) | Government website |
|---|---|---|---|---|
| Taltal | 20,405.1 | 11,100 | 0.5 | link |
| Sierra Gorda | 12,866.4 | 2,356 | 0.2 | link |
| Mejillones | 3,803.9 | 8,418 | 2.2 | link |
| Antofagasta (Capital) | 30,718.1 | 296,905 | 9.7 | link |
| Province | 67,793.5 | 318,779 | 4.7 | link |
