= Energy in Chile =

Chile energy mix

Chile's total primary energy supply (TPES) was 36.10 Mtoe in 2014. Energy in Chile is dominated by fossil fuels, with coal, oil and gas accounting for 73.4% of the total primary energy. Biofuels and waste account for another 20.5% of primary energy supply, with the rest sourced from hydro and other renewables.

Electricity consumption was 68.90 TWh in 2014. Main sources of electricity in Chile are hydroelectricity, gas, oil and coal. Renewable energy in the forms of wind and solar energy are also coming into use, encouraged by collaboration since 2009 with the United States Department of Energy. The electricity industry is privatized with ENDESA as the largest company in the field.

== Electricity ==
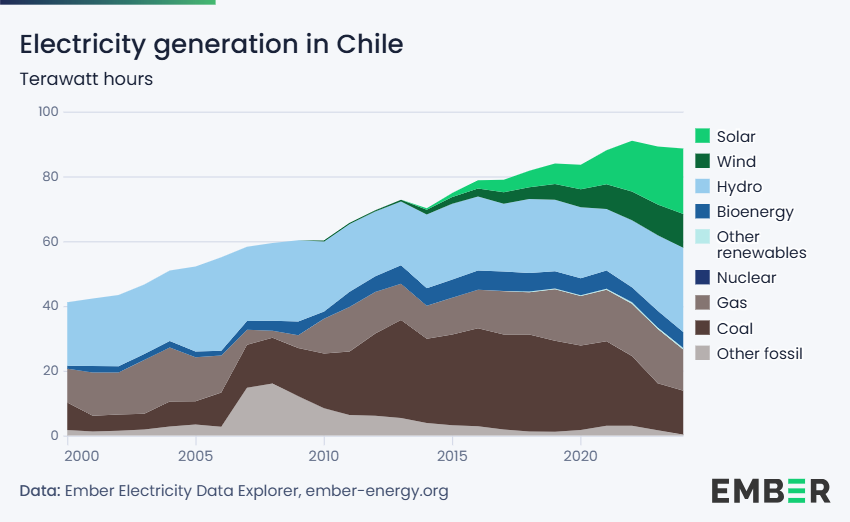
Electricity generation in Chile by source in terawatt hours

The electricity sector in Chile relies mainly on hydro-electric power generation (33% of installed capacity as of May, 2012), oil (13%), gas (30%) and coal (20%). Wind has a small but growing presence with 198 MW. Faced with natural gas shortages that have the potential to jeopardize electricity supply, Chile is currently building its first LNG terminal to secure a supply for its existing and upcoming gas-fired thermal plants. In addition, it has engaged in the construction of several new hydropower and coal-fired thermal plants.

Chile's successful electricity sector reform, which served as a model for other countries, was carried out in the first half of the 1980s. Vertical and horizontal unbundling of generation, transmission and distribution and large-scale privatization led to soaring private investment. However, in recent years, there has been a substantial modification of the 1982 Electricity Act, to bring it line with developments of the last 20 years in the sector. This was the result of a pressing need to change.

The main companies involved, in terms of installed capacity, are the following:

- Enel Generación Chile (formerly ENDESA; 35%, 6085 MW)
- AES Andes (18%, 3157 MW)
- Colbún S.A. (15%, 2621 MW)
- Suez Energy Andino (12%, 2176 MW)
- E.E. Guacolda (3%, 610 MW)
- Pacific Hydro (3%, 551 MW)

A number of other companies account for the remaining 14% (2418 MW)

=== Projects ===
Since the introduction of the so-called "short law II", investments in generation have risen greatly. Currently, there are generation projects amounting to over 26,000 MW, in different stages of development. In 2013, Total S.A. announced the world's largest unsubsidised solar farm would be installed with assistance from SunPower Corp into Chile's Atacama Desert.

== Renewable energy and energy efficiency ==
USDOE announced on June 23, 2009 that U.S. Energy Secretary Chu has signed a Memorandum of Cooperation with Minister Marcelo Tokman of the Chilean National Energy Commission to further collaboration between the two nations. The memorandum establishes an institutional framework between Chile and the United States, allowing DOE to provide its technical expertise in support of a new Renewable Energy Center in Chile. The new center will work to identify developments and best practices in renewable energy technologies from around the world, disseminating its findings within Chile and throughout the region.

The two countries will also collaborate on other high-priority energy issues, including energy efficiency technologies and the establishment of two pilot solar power projects in northern Chile.
