= Mejillones =

- City and Commune
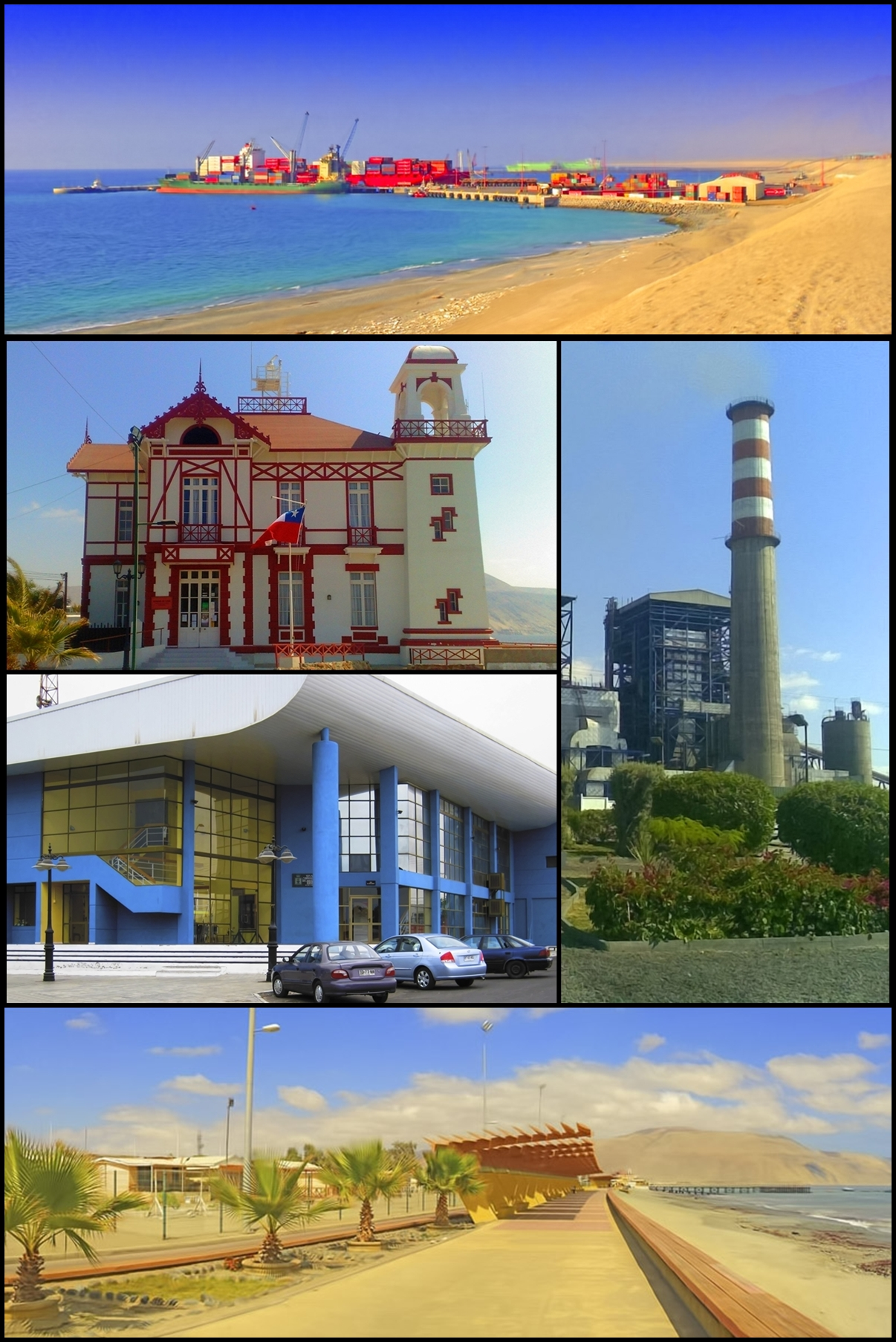

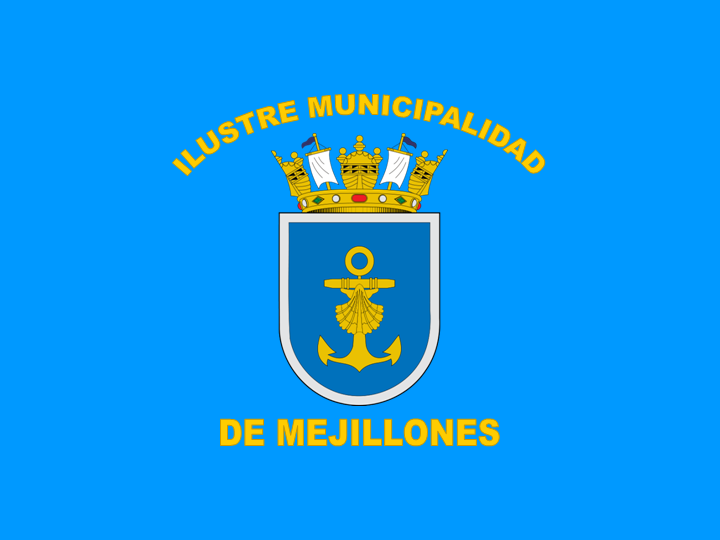
- Flag Coat of arms Map of Mejillones in Antofagasta Region Location in Chile
- Coordinates (city): 23°06′S 70°27′W
- Country: Chile
- Region: Antofagasta
- Province: Antofagasta
- Founded: 1842

Government
  - Type: Commune

Area
  - Total: 3,803.9 km^{2} (1,468.7 sq mi)
- Elevation: 5 m (16 ft)

Population (2024)
  - Total: 14,084
  - Density: 3.7025/km^{2} (9.5895/sq mi)
  - Urban: 13,629
  - Rural: 455
- Demonym: Mejillonino
- Time zone: UTC−4 (CLT)
  - Summer (DST): UTC−3 (CLST)
- Area code: 56 + 55
- Website: Municipality of Mejillones

Mejillones is a Chilean port city and commune in Antofagasta Province in the Antofagasta Region. It is situated in the northern side of the Mejillones Peninsula, 60 km north of the city of Antofagasta. It has 14,084 inhabitants.

To the west, in the northern part of peninsula, is Punta Angamos, the site of the naval combat of the same name, fought during the War of the Pacific (1879-1883).

Mejillones is surrounded by the waters of the Pacific Ocean to the west and by the most arid desert in the world to the east, the Atacama Desert. It also marks the country's widest point (362 km) along a parallel.

The port of Mejillones has eight terminals which together stand for 7.1% of the annual tonnage of Chile's external trade as of 2024.

== Etymology ==
Its name is the plural form of the Spanish mejillón meaning "mussel", referring to a particularly abundant species and preferred staple food of its indigenous inhabitants.

== History ==
The Atacama border dispute between Bolivia and Chile (1825-1879)

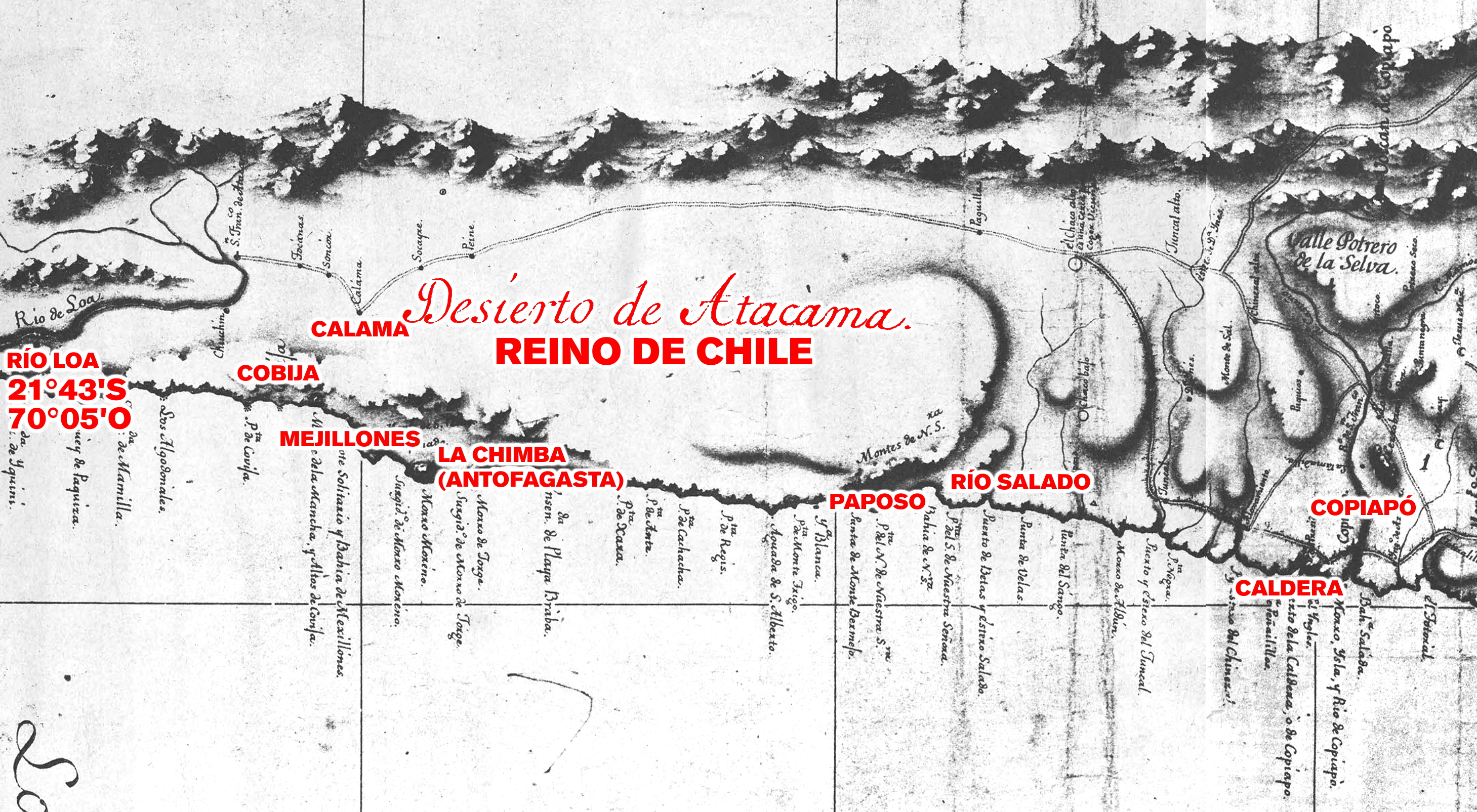
1793 Andrés Baleato's map showing the internal border of Chile and Peru in the Loa River during the Spanish Empire.

The settlement of Mejillones dates back to the first communities of Chango people who inhabited the coastal area from 1825.

Mejillones was included in maps of the Captaincy General of Chile in the 18th century, depending from the city of Copiapó.

Between 1838 and 1839, French businessmen known as Hermano Latrille ("Brothers Latrille"), contracted mining services of the Copiapino Juan López (miner known as Chango Lopez, considered the founder of Antofagasta), to mine guano deposits located south of Mejillones. In this manner, Luan López began mining around the vicinity of San Luciano hill in 1841. The concession for the mining of this raw material was obtained by Domingo Latrille at the hands of the Bolivian government, which would last until 1842. Between 1841 and 1842, they made the largest shipments of this product to Europe.

In 1845, President of Bolivia Manuel Isidoro Belzu had a small fort built on the south side of Mejillones, to become a minor port of Bolivia. Through project development, the Bolivian government proposed to establish a major port city in the large jurisdiction of Mejillones.

The territory was disputed between Chile and Bolivia until the signing of the Boundary Treaty of 1866. Bolivia and Chile mutually agreed to finance the construction of the Oficinas de Administración y Resguardo de Aduanas ("Offices of Administration and Security of Customs") in order to protect the interests of Chilean workers and to implement an export tax on minerals, primarily salt and guano. Subsequently, one of these buildings was transferred to the city of Antofagasta during the War of the Pacific; currently, this building is still in force and designated as the "Regional Museum".

On October 8, 1879, the Battle of Angamos was fought here in front of the peninsula of Angamos between the navies of Chile and Peru, which ended in the Chilean capture of the monitor Huáscar. Afterward, the increasingly prosperous nitrate industry showed a boom going through the port at Mejillones, where the mineral boarded on the Antofagasta railroad left for foreign ports abroad. During this time, strong waves wreaked havoc on the shipping facilities, which required the reestablishment of Mejillones, this time reborn under the Chilean flag.

Also after the War of the Pacific, administrative organization began, which in the case of Mejillones would involve the preparation of urban planning in agreement with the existing type of port. This work was commissioned to naval engineer Emilio de Vitds. The plan, which was perhaps more realistic than those proposed before, was based on 63 city blocks and was completed with the Foundation Act (Acta de Fundación), signed by president Germán Riesco and dated February 7, 1906.

In 1970, a majority vote approved the bill presented by Mayor Araya Cuadra to build a theater located across the rear of the Plaza Almirante Latorre. The work was carried out with the grant of a loan by the Ministry of Housing and Urban Development in the amount of $500,000. Such funding would not satisfy the completion of the project, and work stopped in 1972 pending the granting of a loan extension that failed to materialize by the time of the coup of the Armed Forces of September 11th of 1973.

Mejillones is within a sacrifice zone in the Atacama and has eight coal-fired power stations as of 2024. Pollution of the seabed has resulted in a decline in fishing in the area.

== Administration ==
As a commune, Mejillones is a third-level administrative division of Chile administered by a municipal council, headed by an alcalde who is directly elected every four years.

Within the electoral divisions of Chile, Mejillones is represented in the Chamber of Deputies by Pedro Araya (PRI) and Manuel Rojas (UDI) as part of the 4th electoral district, together with Antofagasta, Sierra Gorda, and Taltal. The commune is represented in the Senate by Carlos Cantero Ojeda (Ind.) and José Antonio Gómez Urrutia (PRSD) as part of the 2nd senatorial constituency (Antofagasta Region).

== Demographics ==
Historical population
Year	Pop.	±% p.a.
1907	4,096	—
1920	6,940	+4.14%
1930	4,141	−5.03%
1940	2,820	−3.77%
1952	3,599	+2.05%
1970	3,255	−0.56%
1982	4,417	+2.58%
1992	6,315	+3.64%
2002	8,418	+2.92%
2017	13,467	+3.18%
2024	14,084	+0.64%
Source: INE, Memoria Chilena

As of the 2024 census, the commune has a population of 14,084, of which 49.9% are male and 50.1% are female. People under 15 years old make up 23.8% of the population, and people over 65 years old make up 7.9%. 96.8% of the population is urban and 3.2% is rural.

=== Immigration ===
As of the 2024 census, immigrants make up 29.8% of the population - 29.5% are from South America, 0.1% from North America, 0.1% from Europe, 0.1% from Asia, and 0.04% from Africa.
