= Climate of Venezuela =

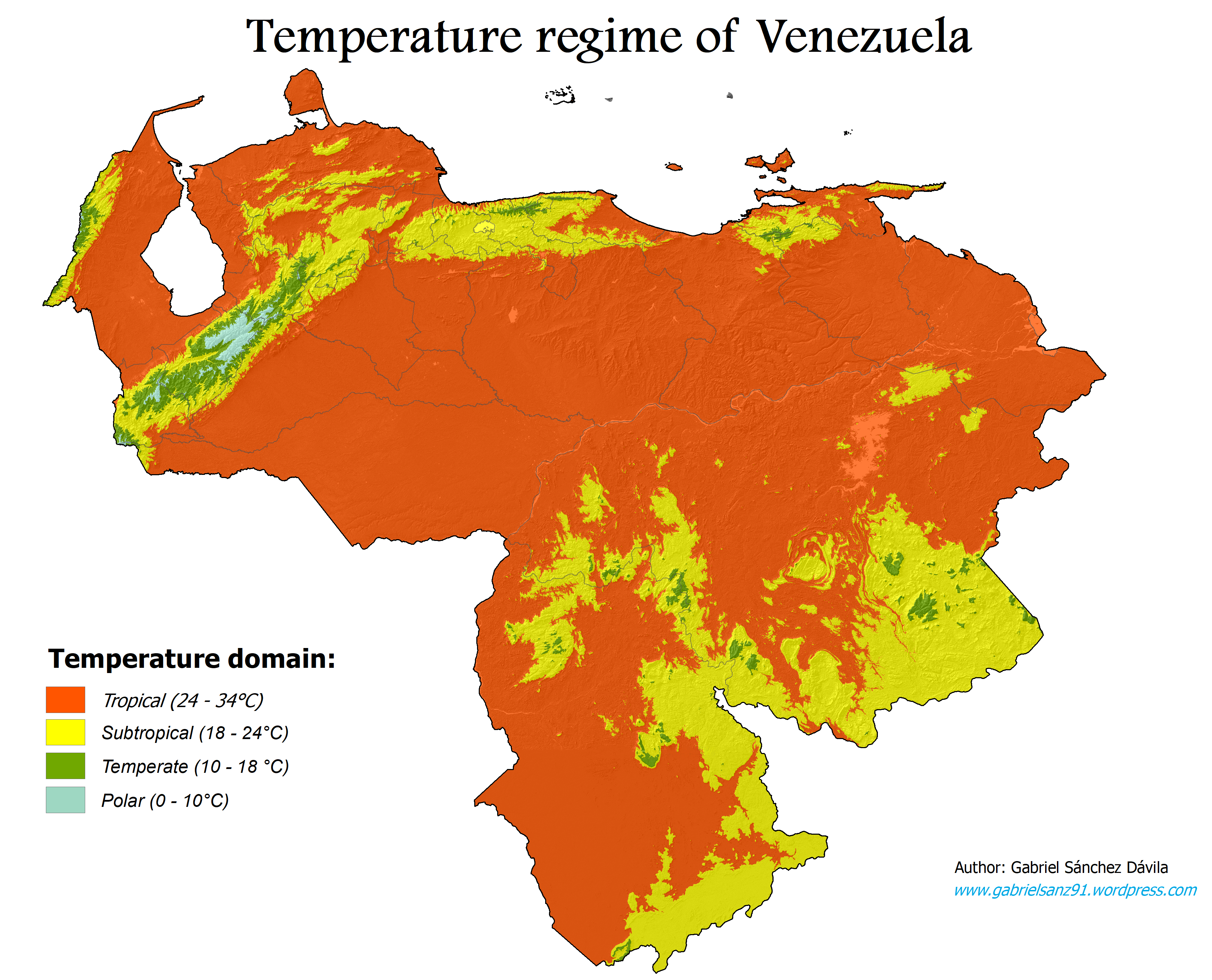
Temperature regimes of Venezuela

The Climate of Venezuela is characterized for being tropical and megathermal as a result of its geographical location near the Equator, but because of the topography and the dominant wind direction, several climatic types occur which can be the same as found in temperate latitudes, and even polar regions. Latitude exerts little influence on the Venezuelan climate. While the coastal cities of Maracaibo, Barcelona, Porlamar and Maiquetia can get extremely hot, cities in valleys such as Mérida, Caracas, Los Teques and San Cristobal have cooler climates, and the highest towns of Mucuchies and Apartaderos have cold (tundra) climates.

The hottest part of Venezuela is the northwest (Paraguana Peninsula and Guajira Peninsula), where temperatures of more than 38 °C (100 °F) are frequently recorded. The coldest part in the country are located in the highest areas of the Cordillera de Mérida, where temperatures lower than −2 °C (28 °F) are recorded. The Venezuelan Coastal Range and Guiana Highlands have average temperatures from 25 °C (77 °F) to 11 °C (52 °F), while the Llanos average temperature is over 23 °C (73 °F).

The highest temperature recorded was 42 °C (108 °F) in Machiques, and the lowest temperature recorded was −11 °C (12 °F), it has been reported from an uninhabited high altitude at Páramo de Piedras Blancas (Mérida state), even though no official reports exist, lower temperatures in the mountains of the Sierra Nevada de Mérida are known.

== Climate zones according to Köppen ==
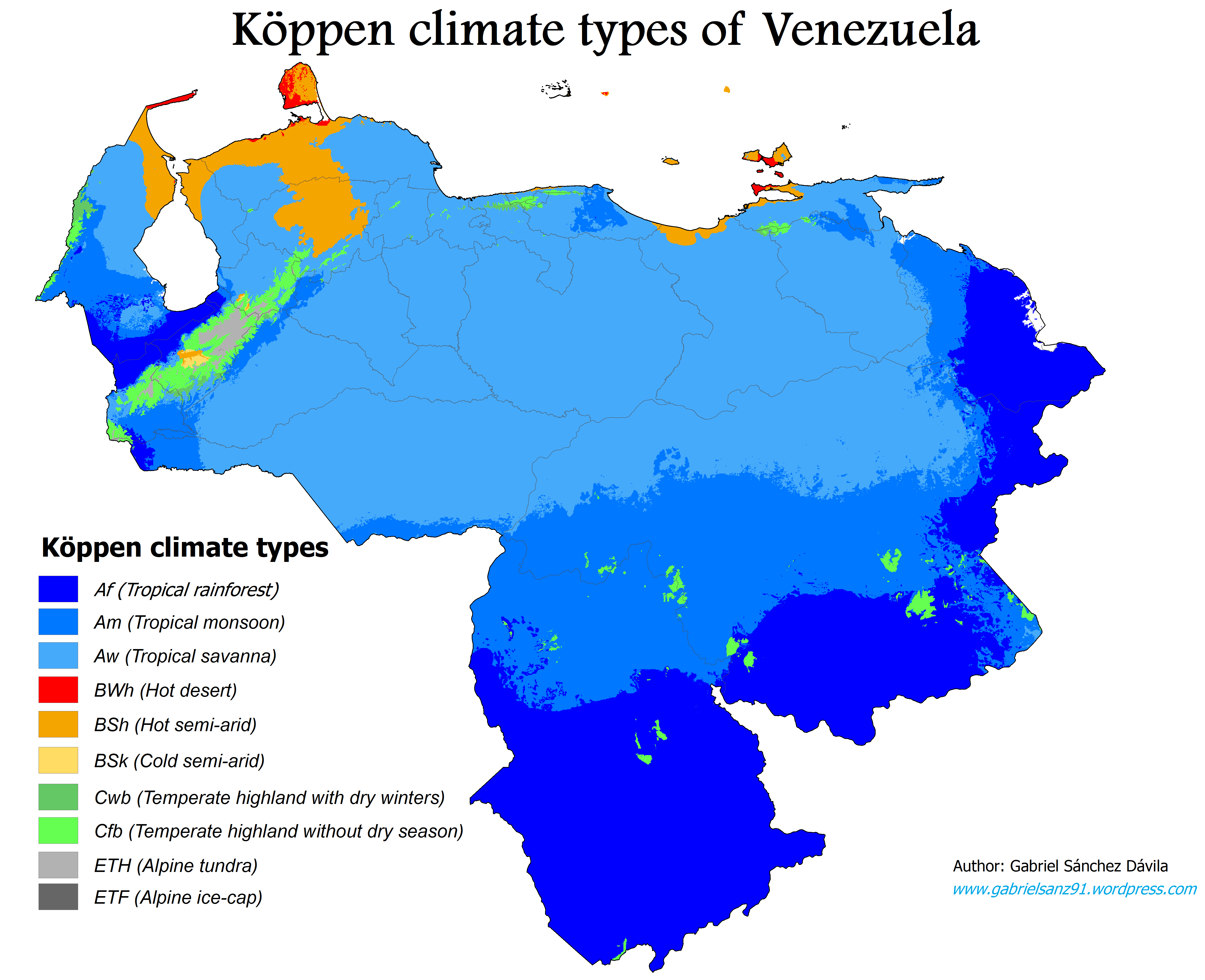
Köppen climate classification map of Venezuela.

According to the Köppen climate classification, Venezuela's climate types are:

=== Group A: Tropical climates ===
It's the most prevalent and characteristic climate of the country. Maintaining temperatures above 18 °C (64 °F) and rainfall in most of the year:

- Tropical savanna climate (Aw)

It can be found throughout the country, dominating the Llanos and northern Guayana Region, as well as other parts of the country. It is dry between December and March with annual rainfall between 600 and 1,500 mm.

- Tropical monsoon climate (Am)

It is located in the Guayana Region, Orinoco Delta, west of Zulia, Andean and Coastal range foothills, Paria Peninsula and Barlovento region; with rainfall between 1,600 and 2,500 mm per year and a drought of just 45 days.

- Tropical rainforest climate (Af)

It's located south of Venezuela, Orinoco Delta, El Tamá area in west of Venezuela, and south of Maracaibo Lake. Rainfall exceeds 2,500 mm, not tending dry season.

Tropical climates of Venezuela

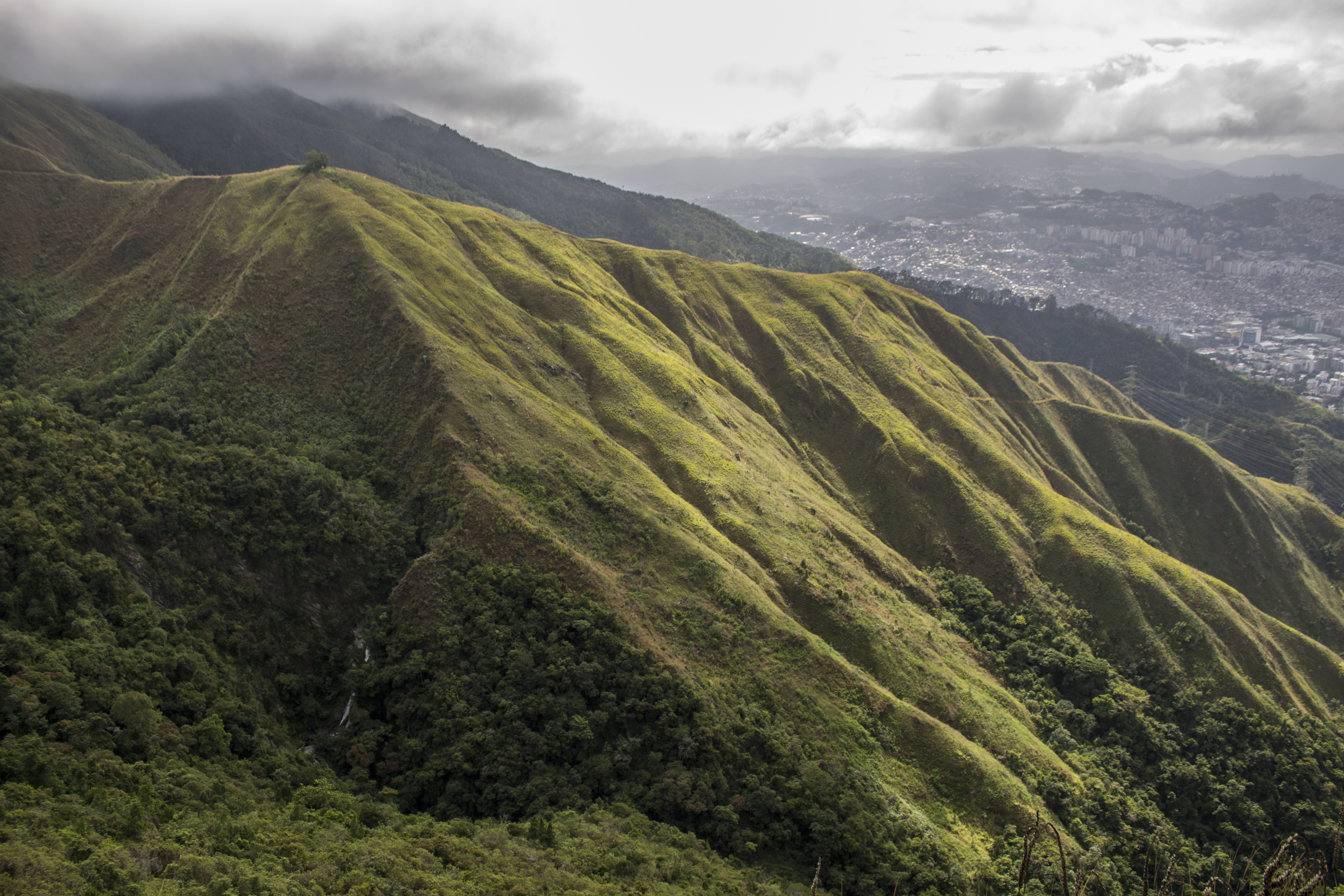
Tropical savanna climate, influenced by a temperate highland climate in Caracas Valley

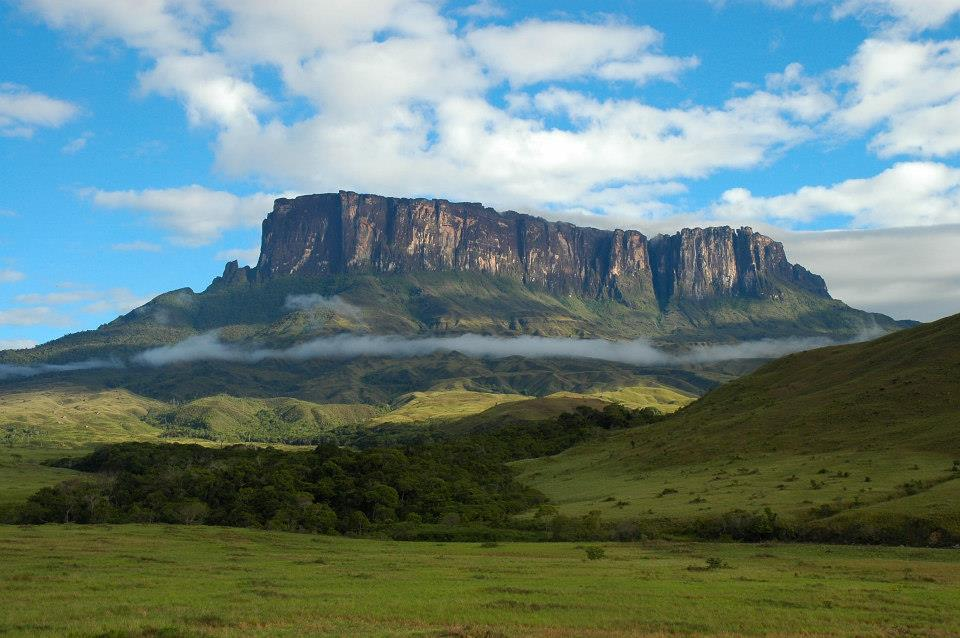
Tropical savanna climate in the Gran Sabana

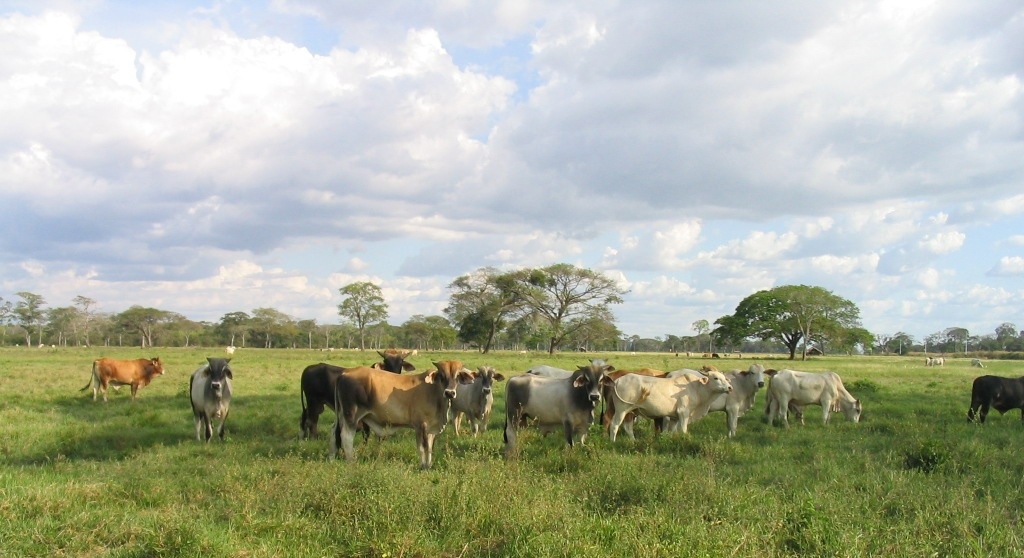
Tropical savanna climate in the Llanos

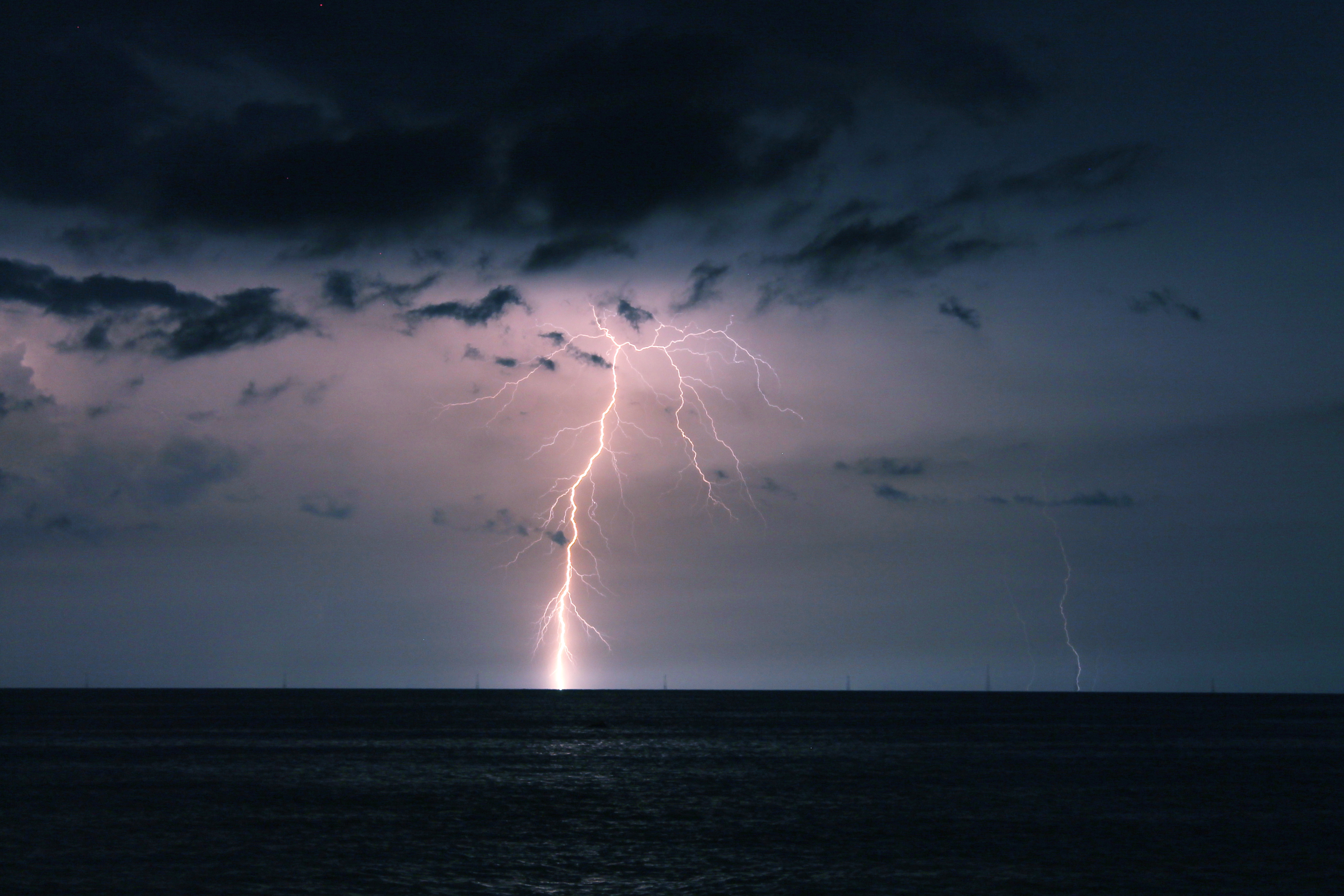
Tropical monsoon climate in Sur del Lago

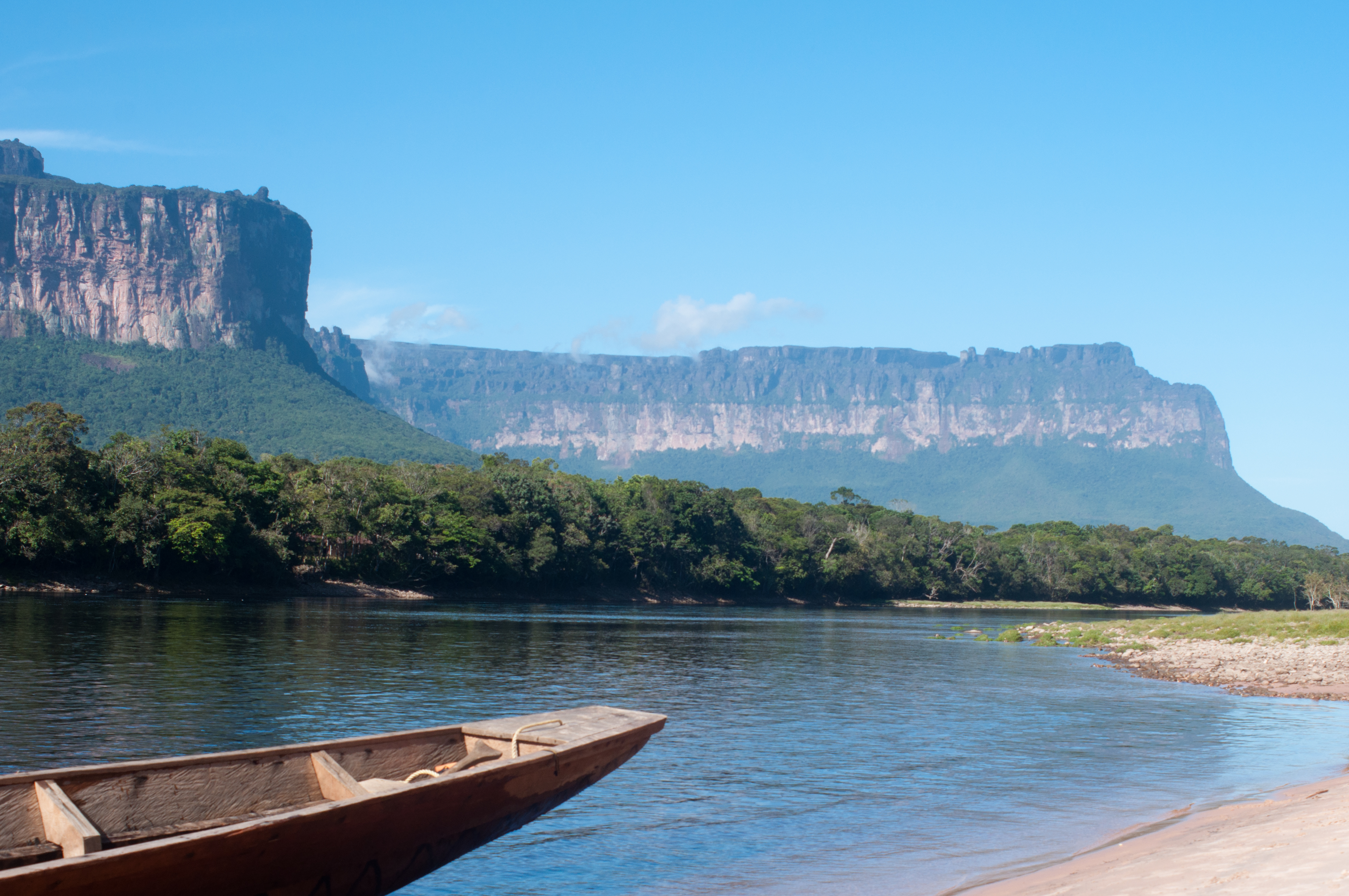
Tropical monsoon climate in Canaima

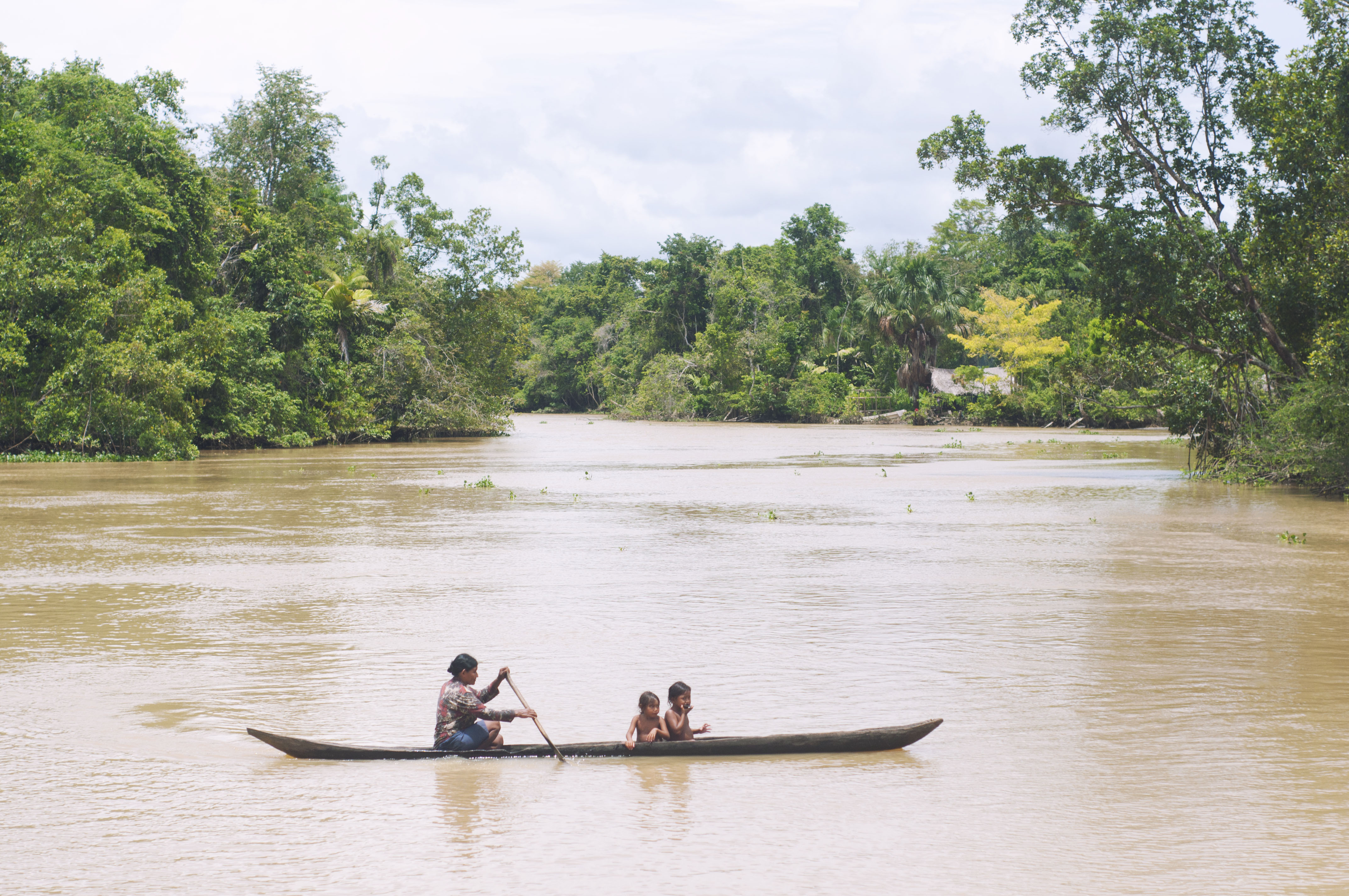
Tropical rainforest climate in Orinoco Delta

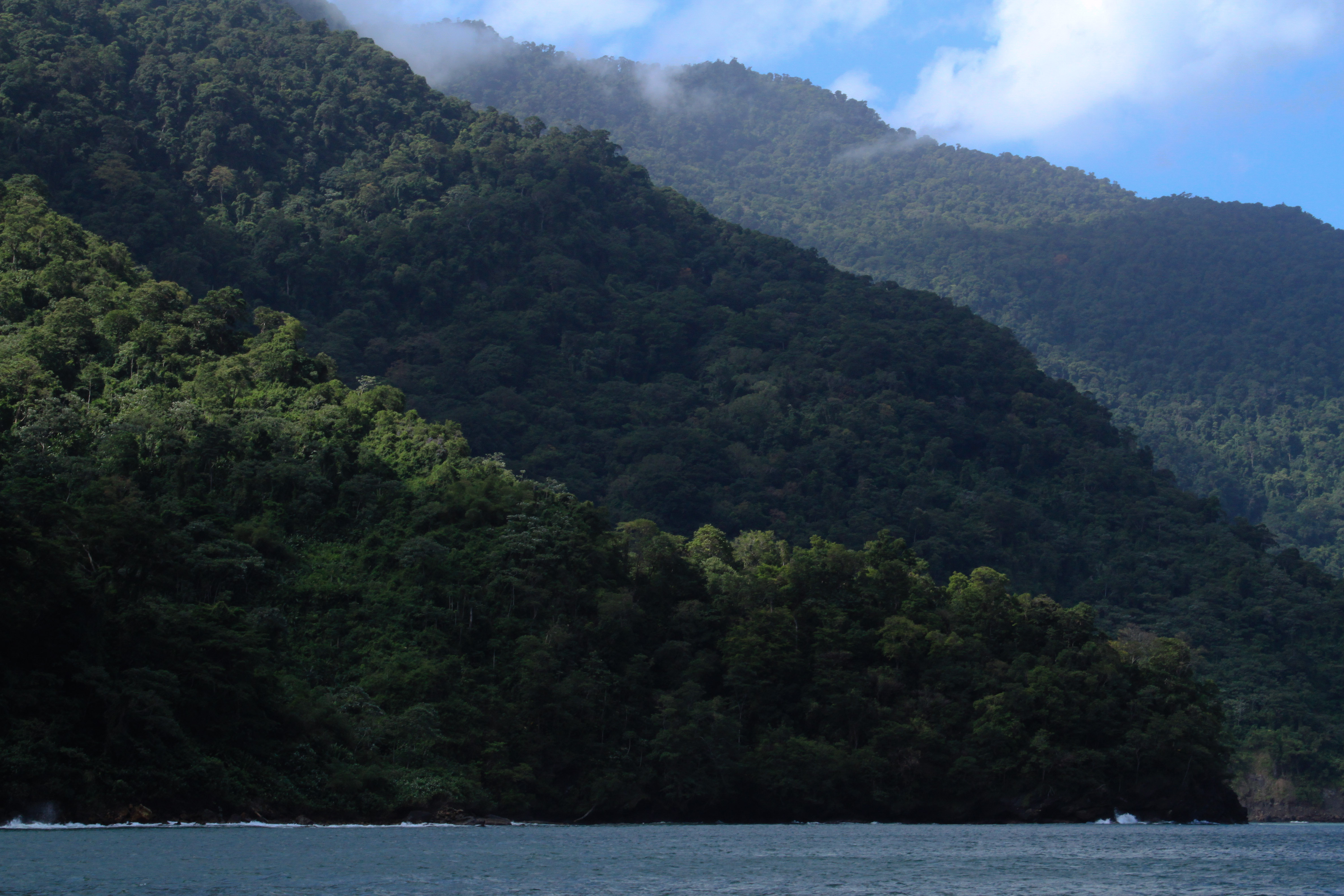
Tropical rainforest climate in Paria Peninsula

=== Group B: Dry climates ===
This type of climate the evaporation exceeds precipitation. In Venezuela is typical of desert and arid coastal areas and with annual temperatures above 18 °C. The cold semiarid type can be found at elevated portions of the Andes, where annual average are below 18 °C, resulting in cooler air.

- Hot desert climate (BWh)

It can be found in Guajira Peninsula, Paraguana Peninsula, Araya Peninsula and most of the Insular region.

- Hot semi-arid climate (BSh)

It is located in the northern part of Zulia state, most of the area of Lara state and Falcón state, the coastal area, Insular region and some semi-arid areas in Venezuelan Andes.

- Cold semi-arid (BSk)

It can be found locked at the temperate zones of high Andean valleys of Cordillera de Mérida. This climate type occurs because, at these elevations, the air is cooler, which reduces humidity and results in lower precipitation. Combined with higher rates of evaporation relative to precipitation, these areas experience a semi-arid steppe-like environment.

Dry climates of Venezuela

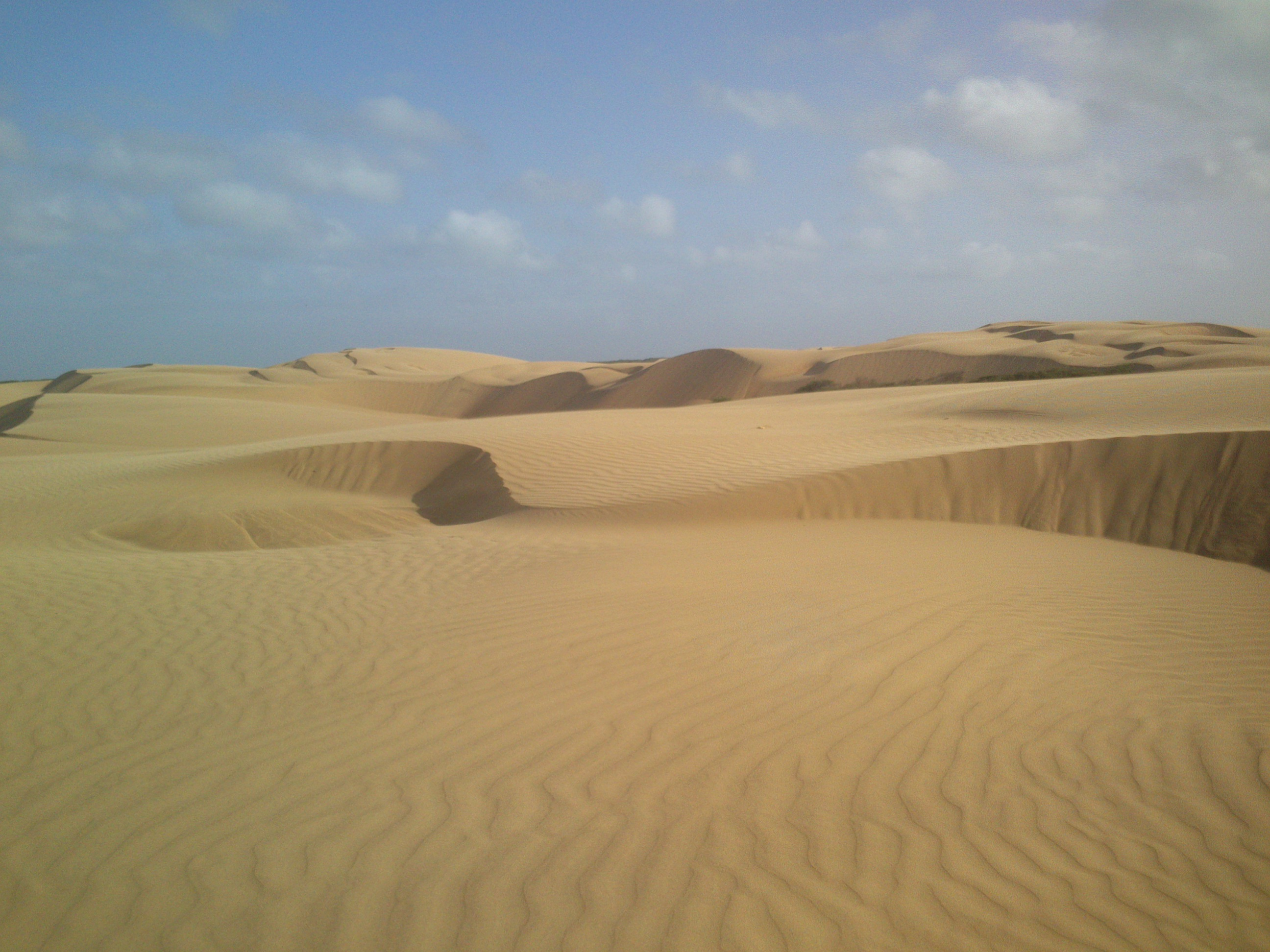
Hot desert climate in Medanos de Coro National Park

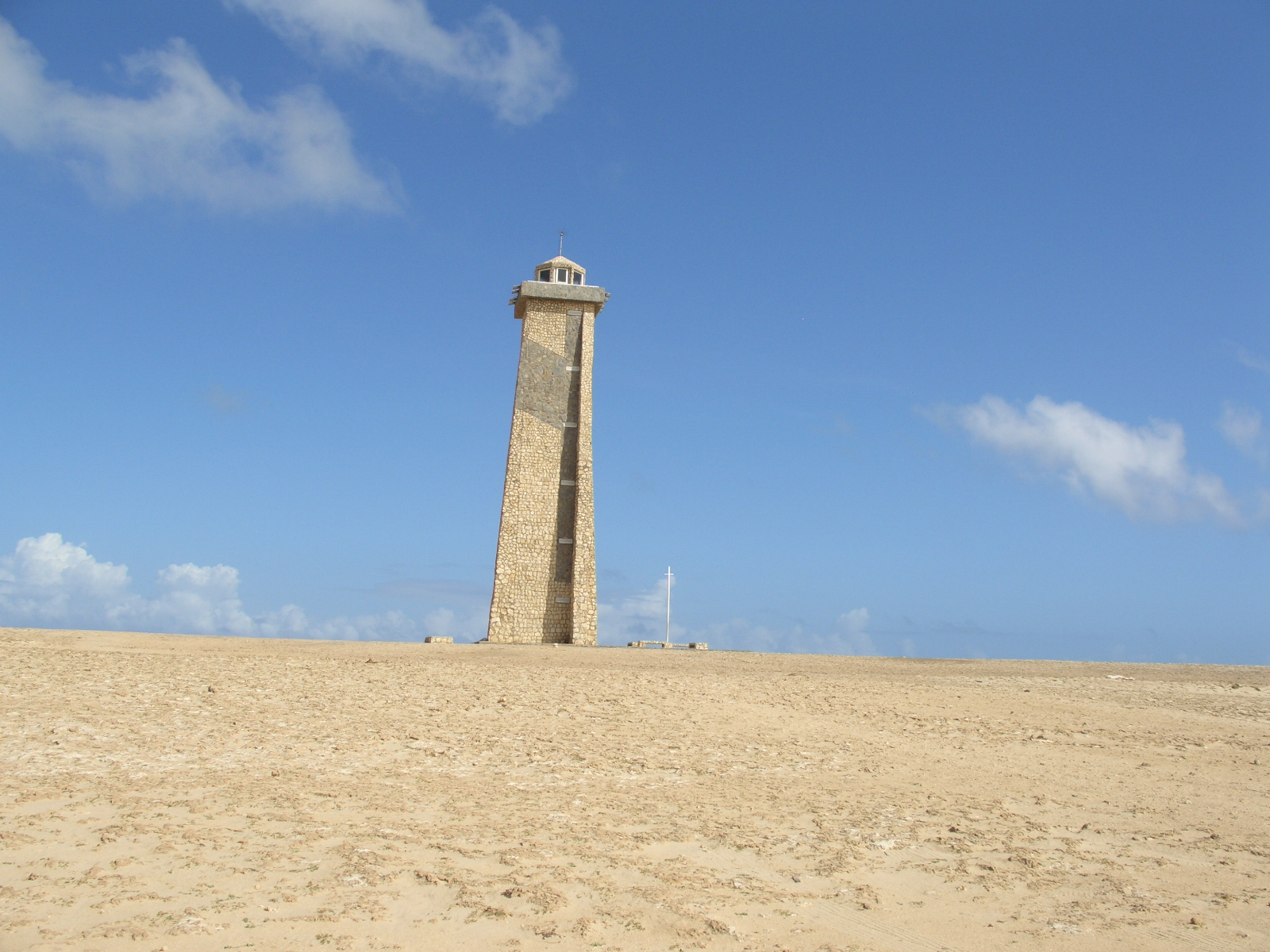
Hot desert climate in Cabo San Roman

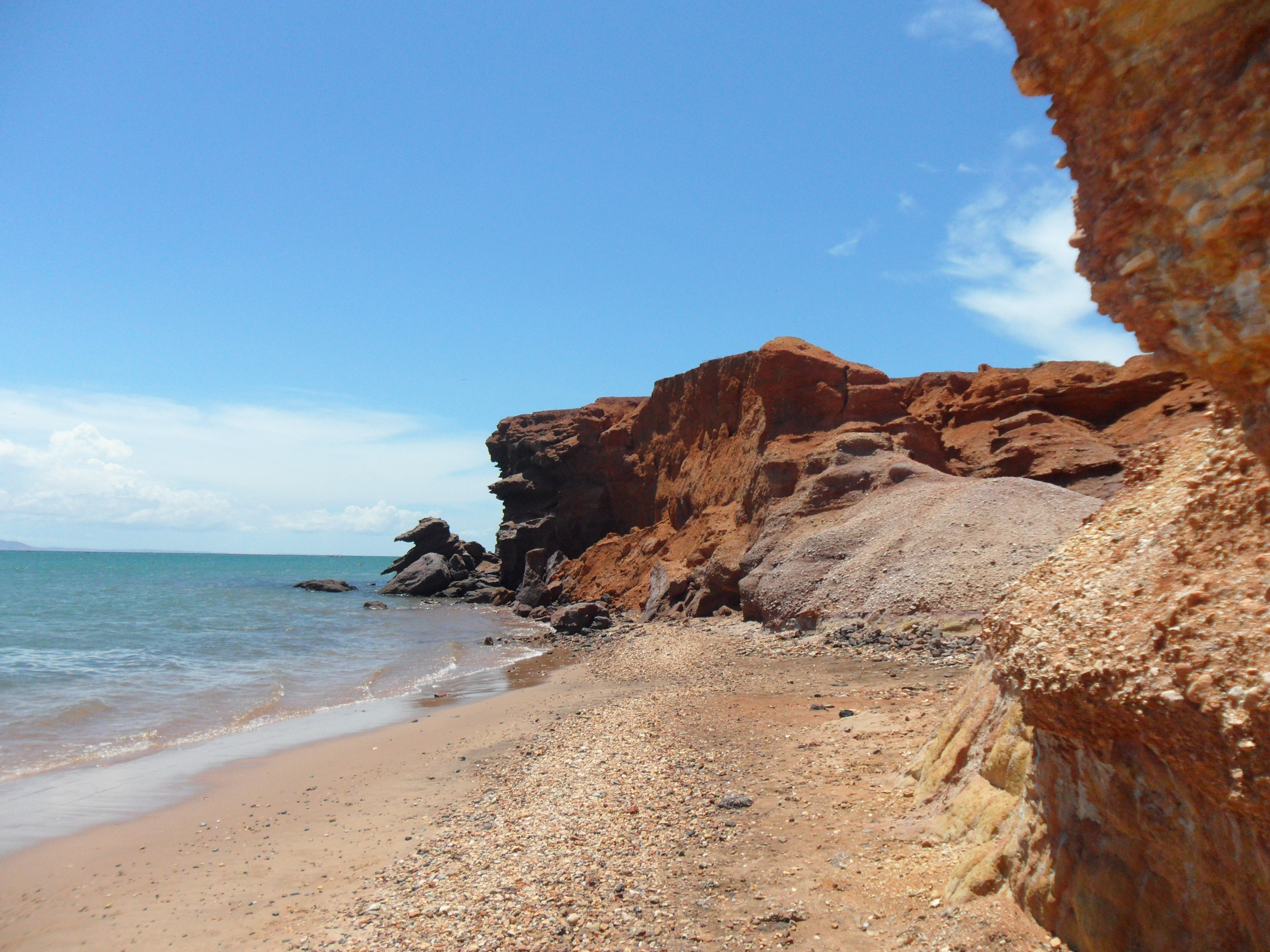
Hot desert climate in Coche Island

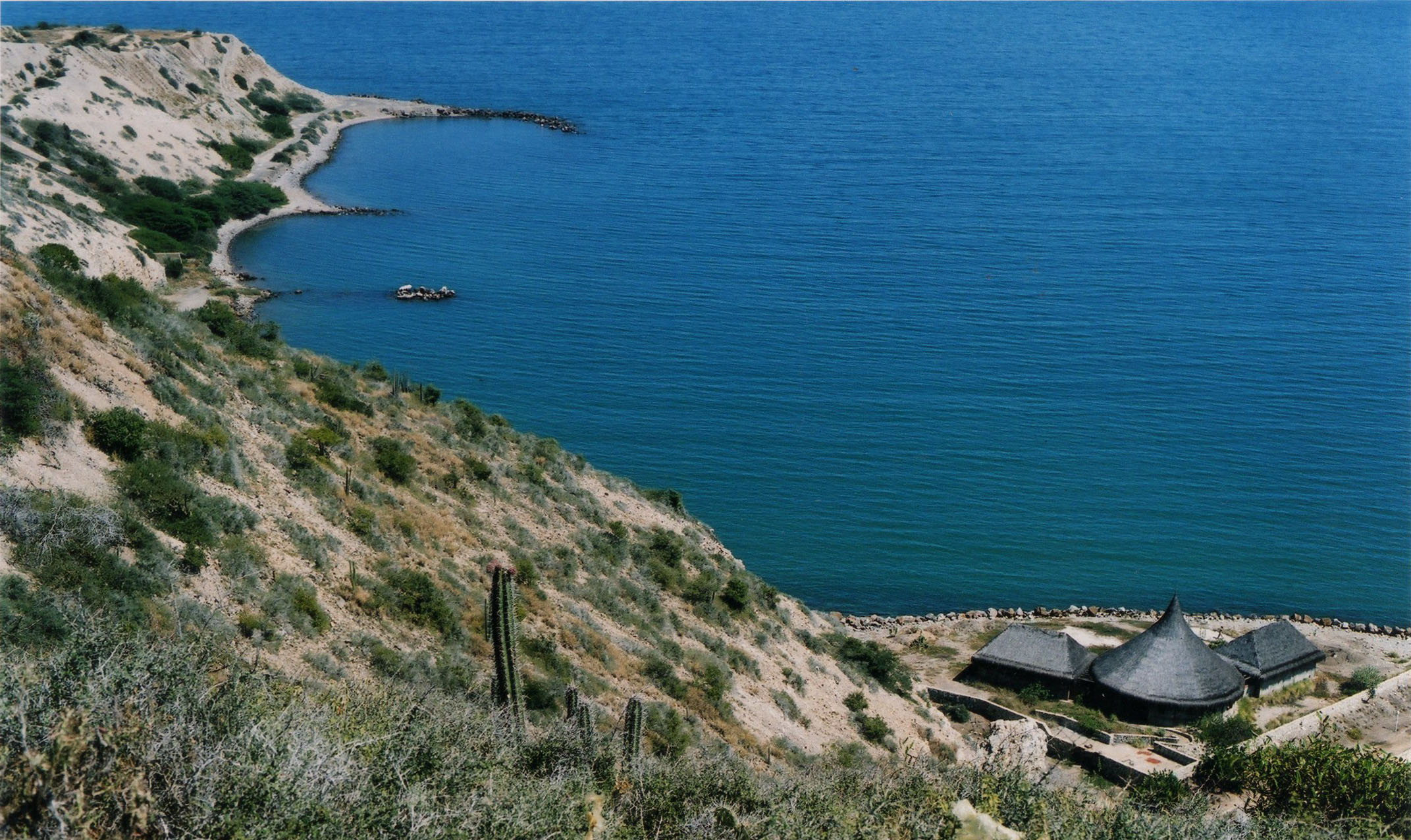
Hot semi-arid climate in Puerto La Cruz

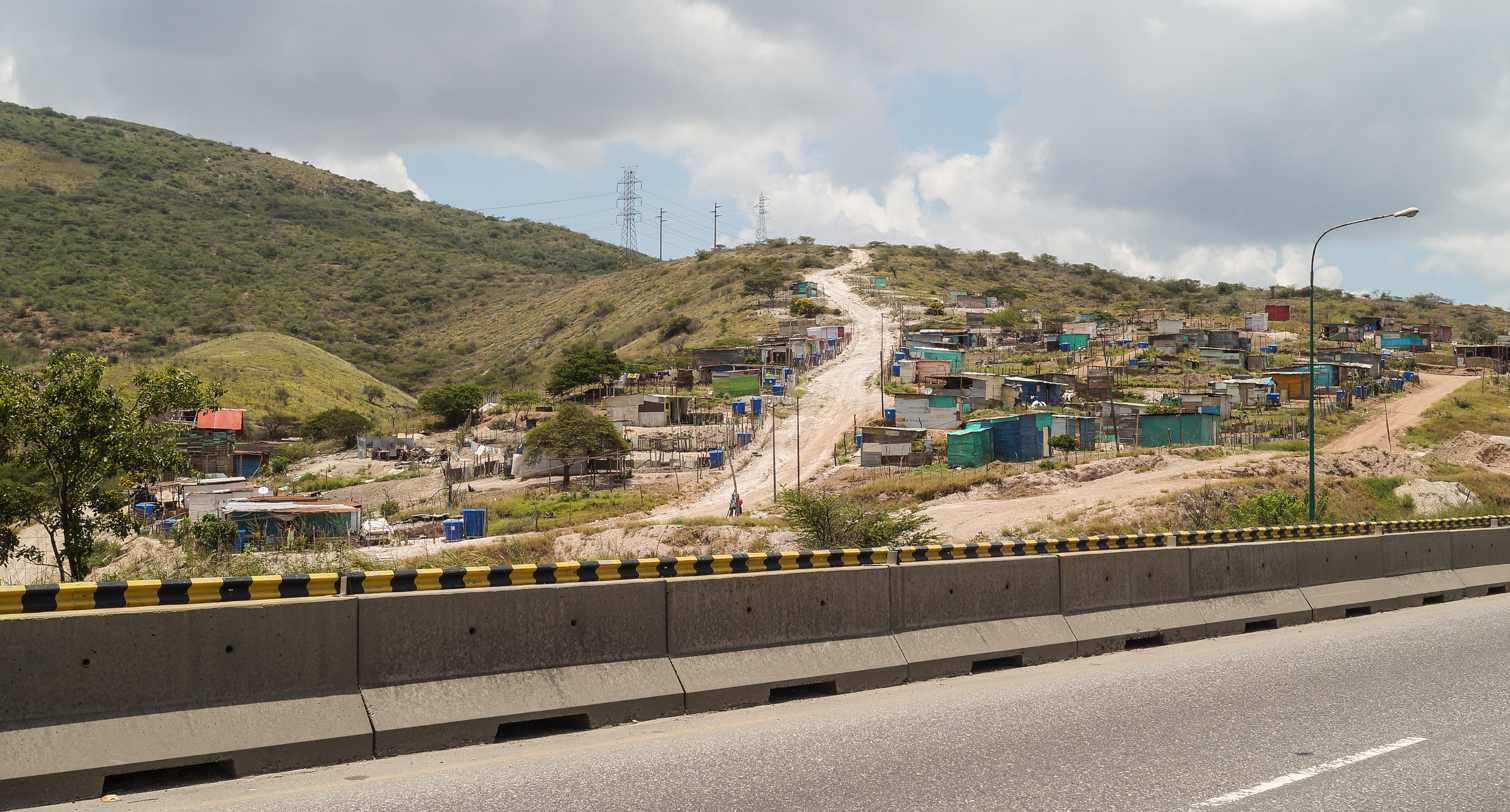
Hot semi-arid climate in Barquisimeto

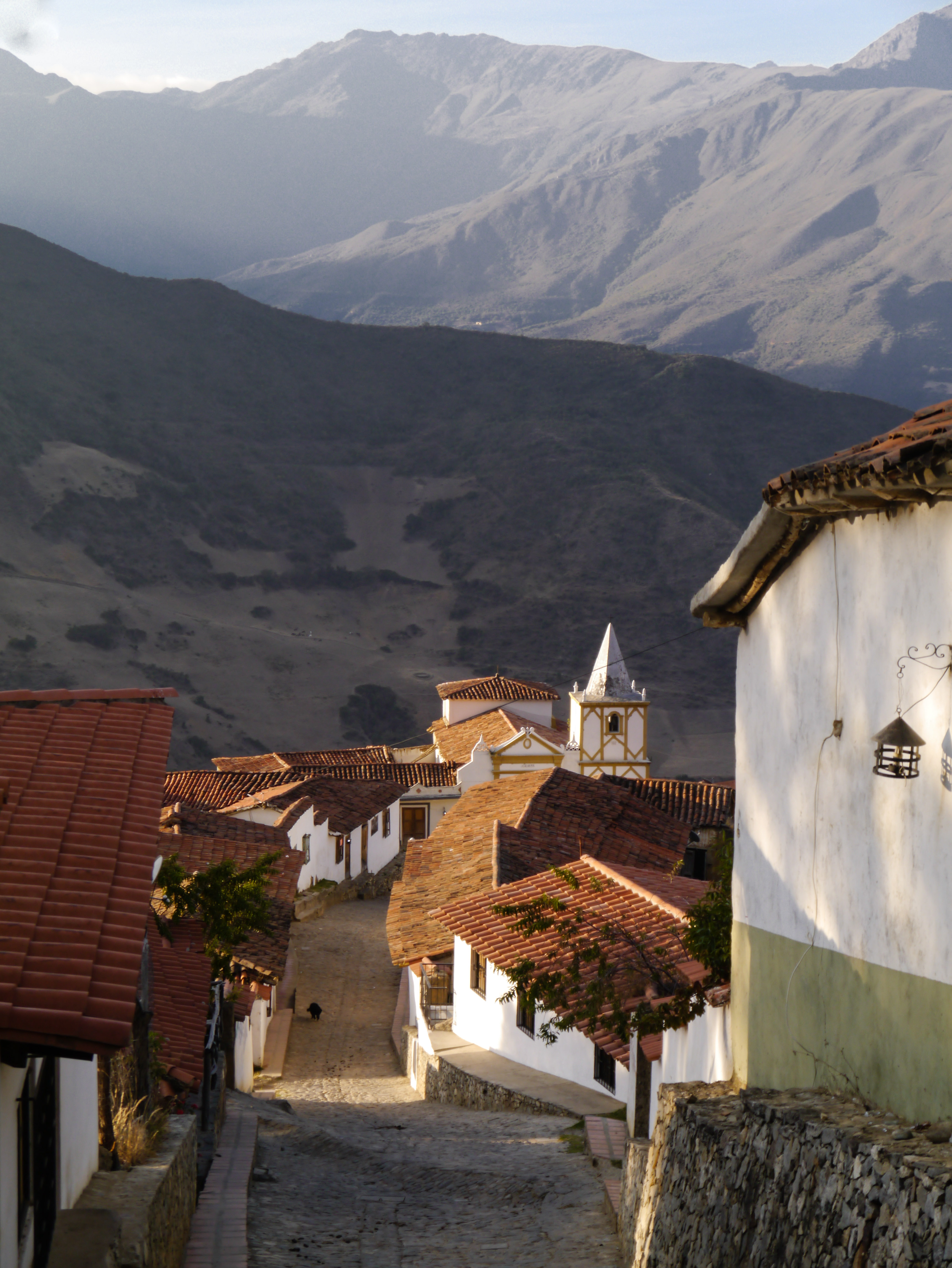
Cold semi-arid climate in Los Nevados

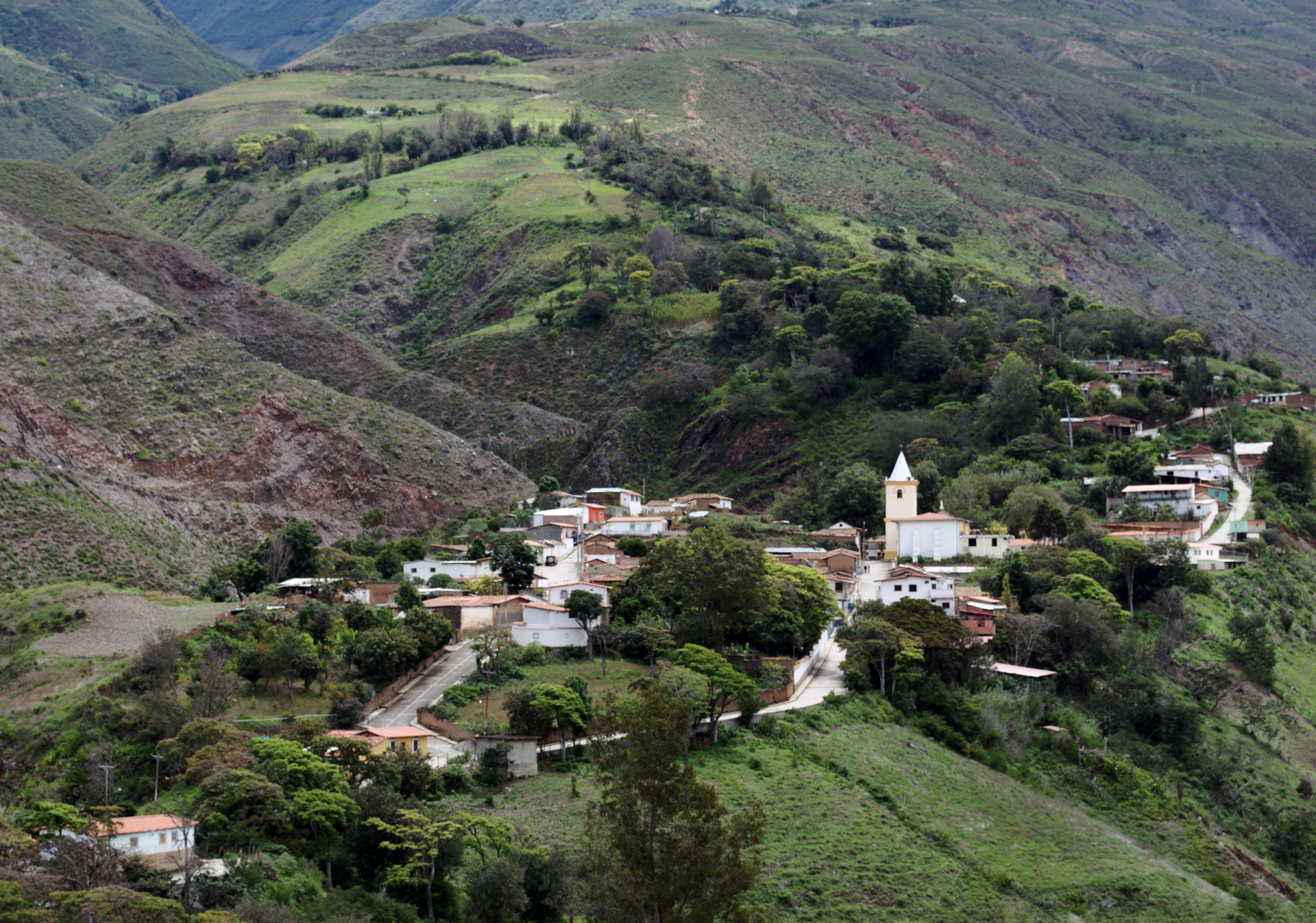
Cold semi-arid climate in the Southern foothills of the Sierra Nevada de Mérida

=== Group C: Temperate climates ===
The monthly averages temperatures are below 22 °C (72 °F) but above 0 °C (32 °F). At least one month's average temperature is below 18 °C (64 °F). This cooler climate occur primarily in high-altitude regions of the country, because of their elevation, which moderates the tropical temperature found at lower altitud. The main types found in Venezuela are:

- Temperate highland climates with dry winters (Cwb)

It tends to experience noticeably drier weather during the lower-sun "winter" season. It's located in the medium areas of the southern-east slope of Cordillera de Mérida and Sierra de Perija, the highest areas of south-western Venezuelan coastal range.

- Temperate highland climates without dry season (Cfb)

This climate doesn't tend to has a dry season. It's located in the medium areas of the Cordillera de Mérida and Sierra de Perija, the highest areas of Venezuelan coastal range, and the top of the highest Guiana Highlands Tepuis.

Temperate climates of Venezuela

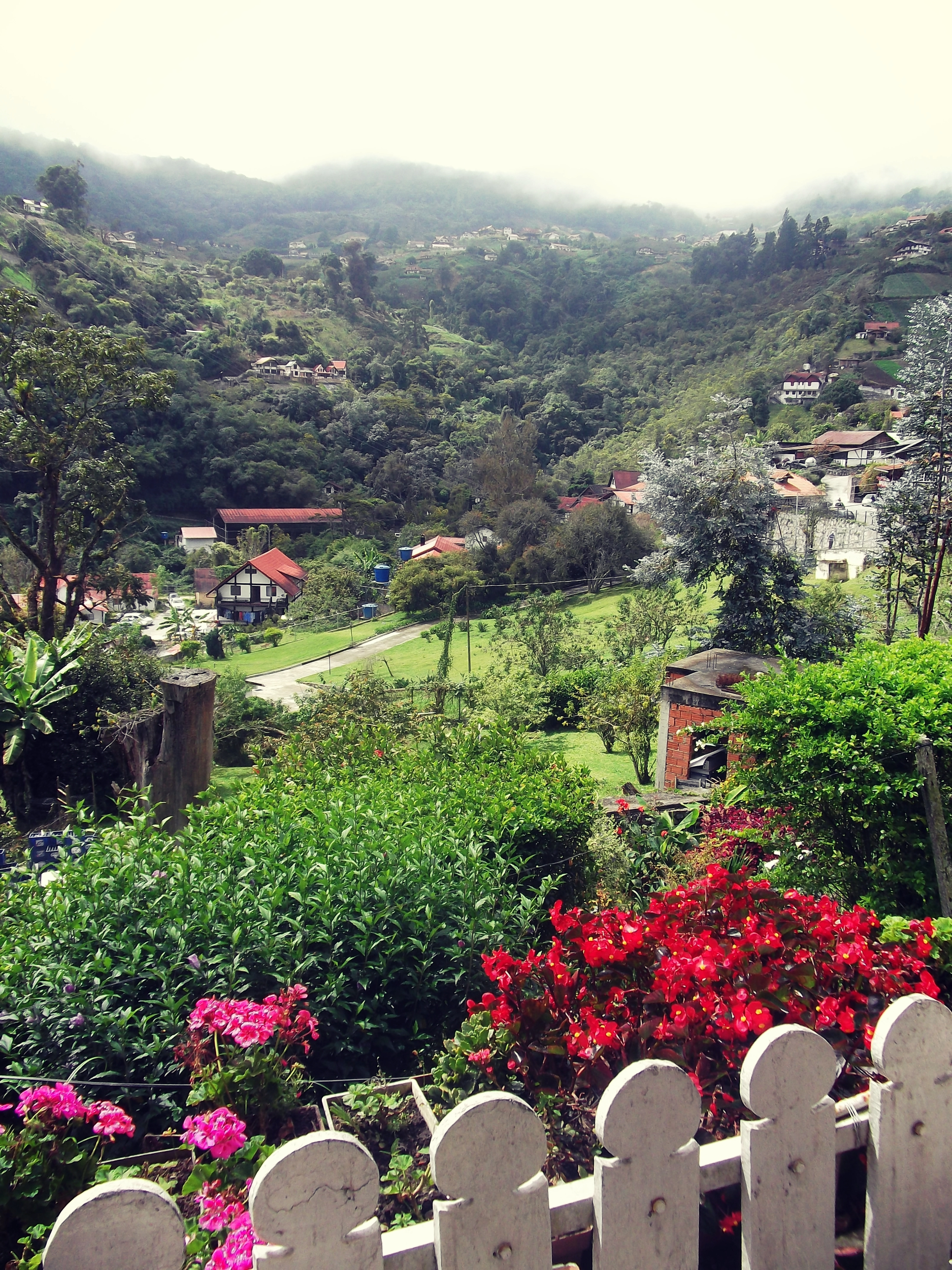
Temperate highland climate in Colonia Tovar

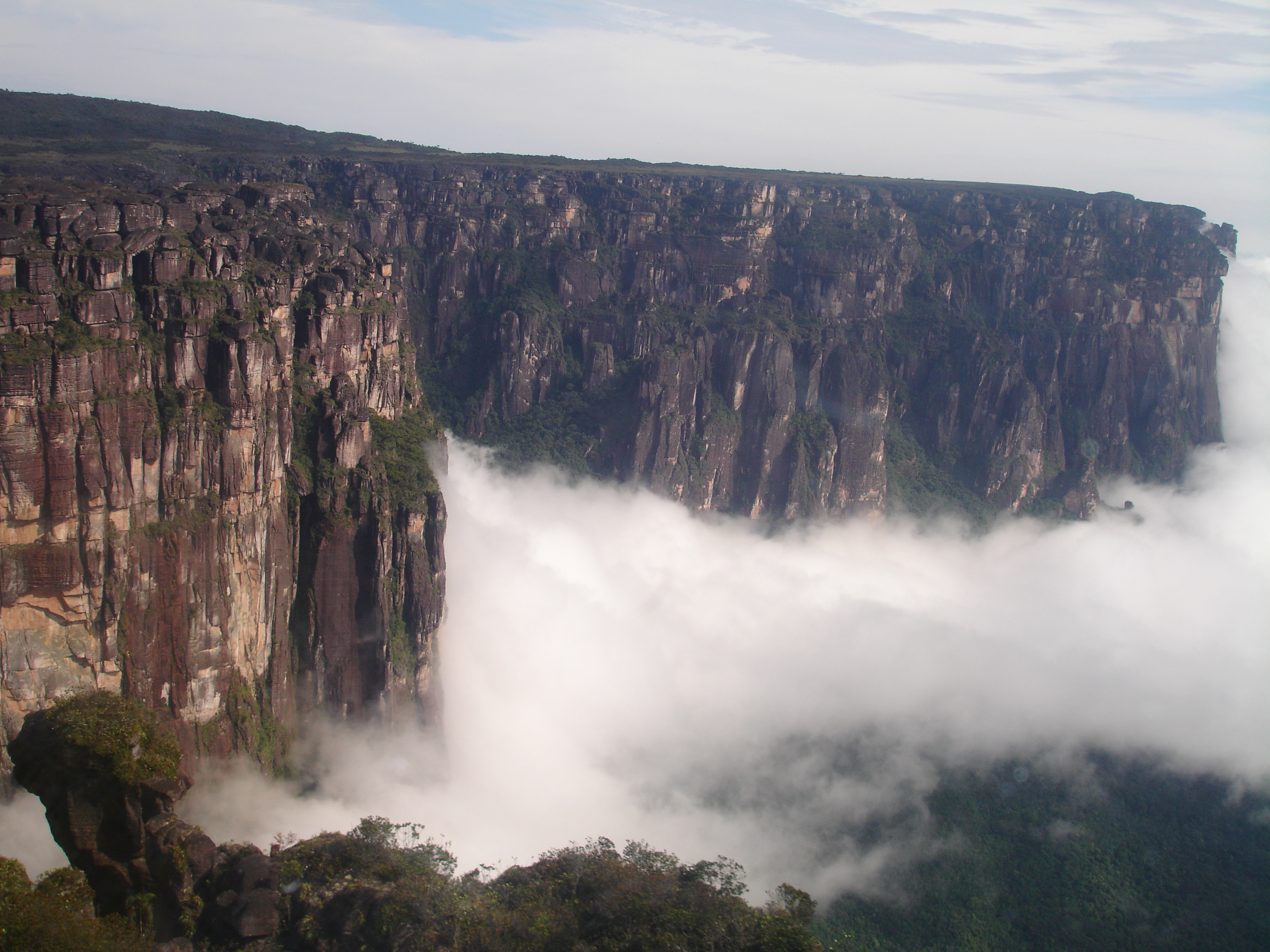
Temperate highland climate in Auyantepui

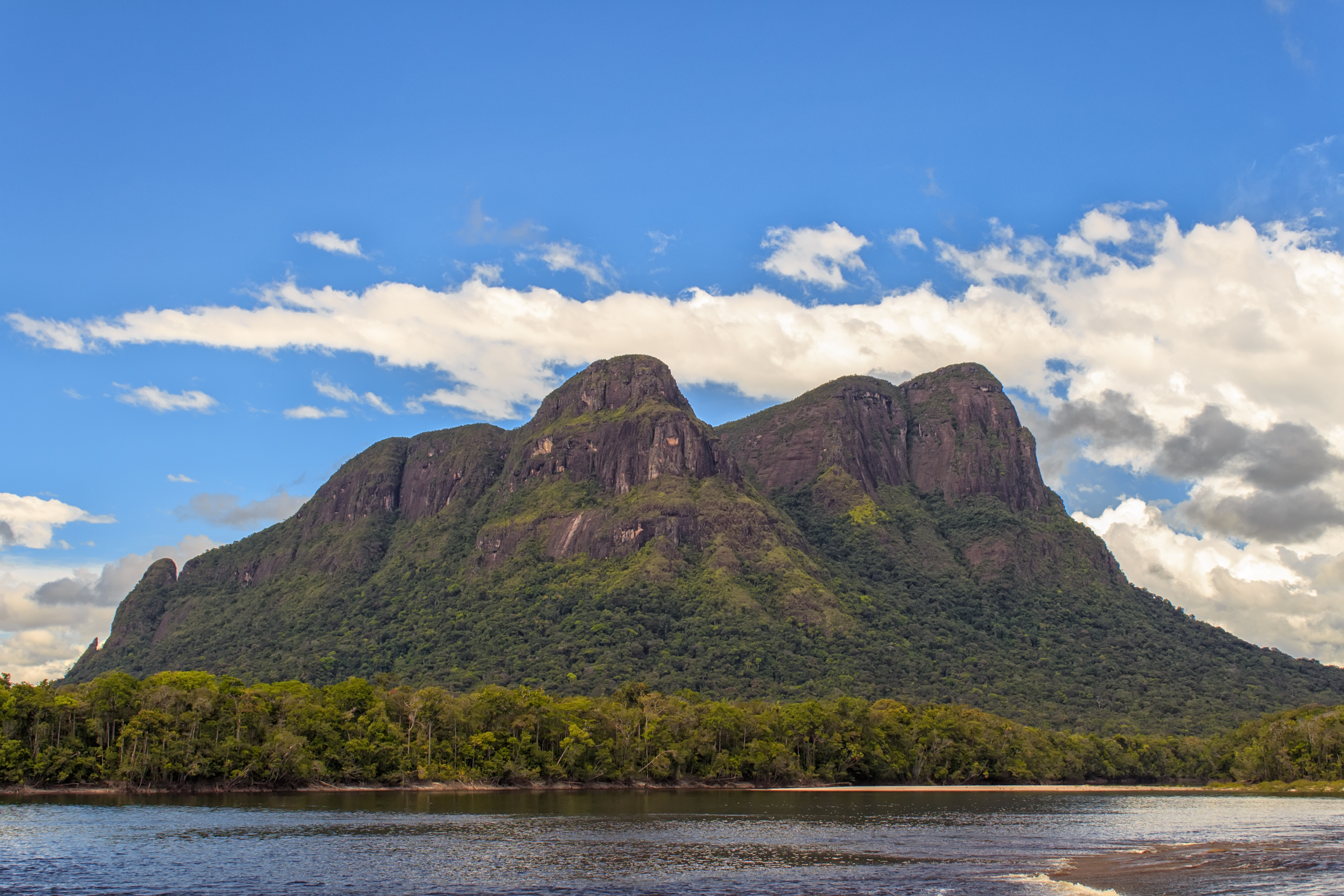
Temperate highland climate in Amazonas

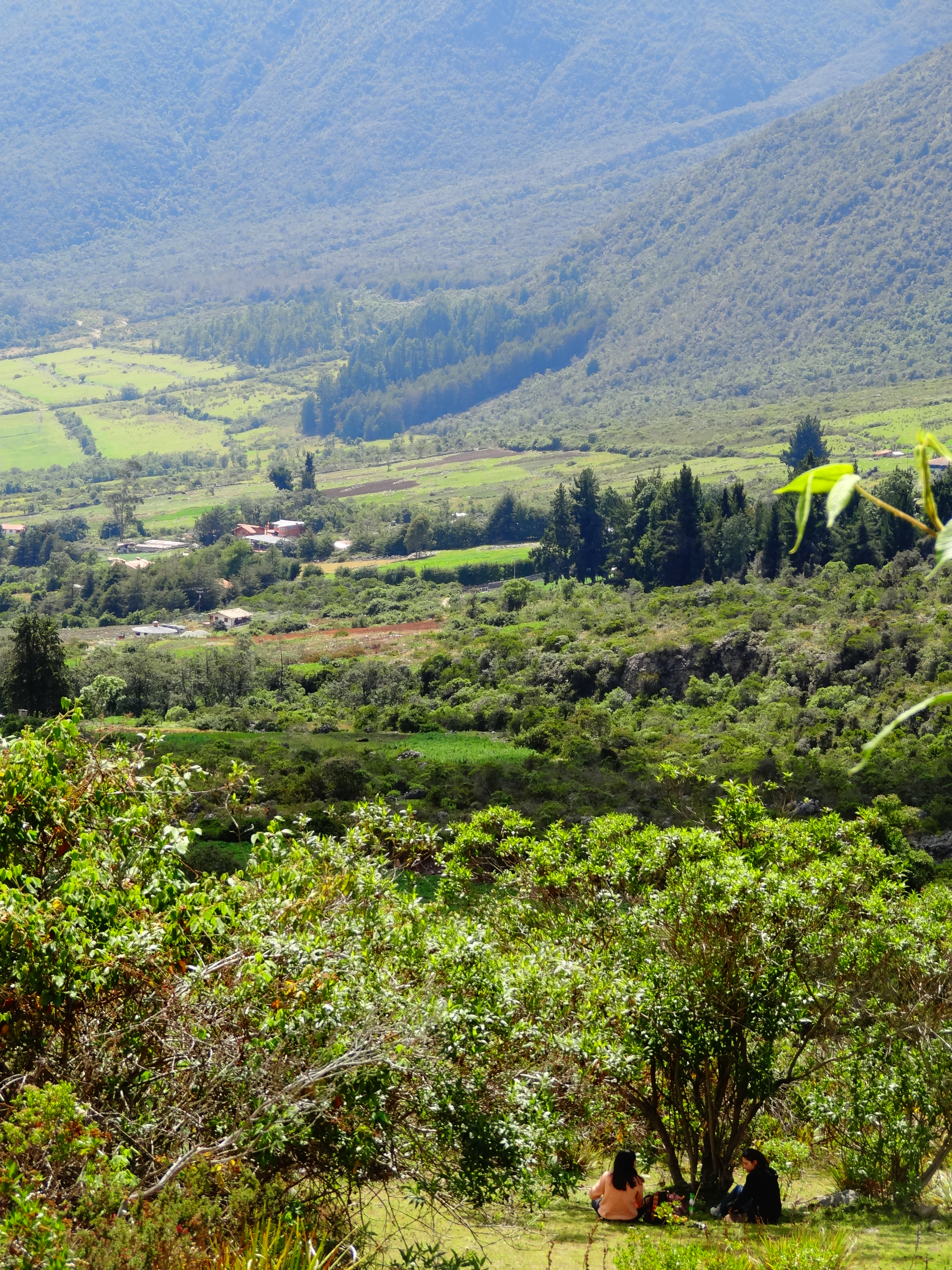
Temperate highland climate in Sierra La Culata

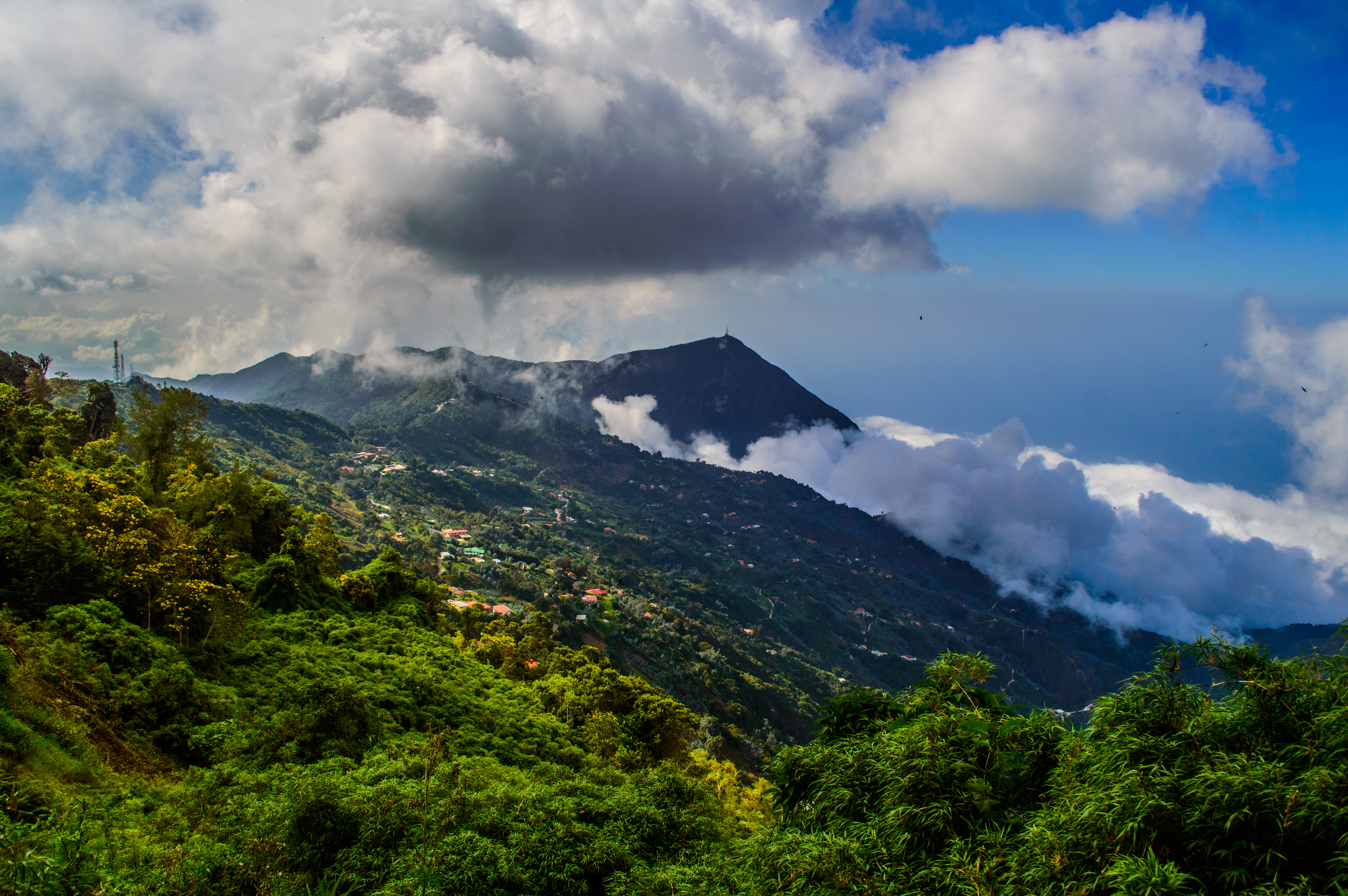
Temperate highland climate in El Avila National Park

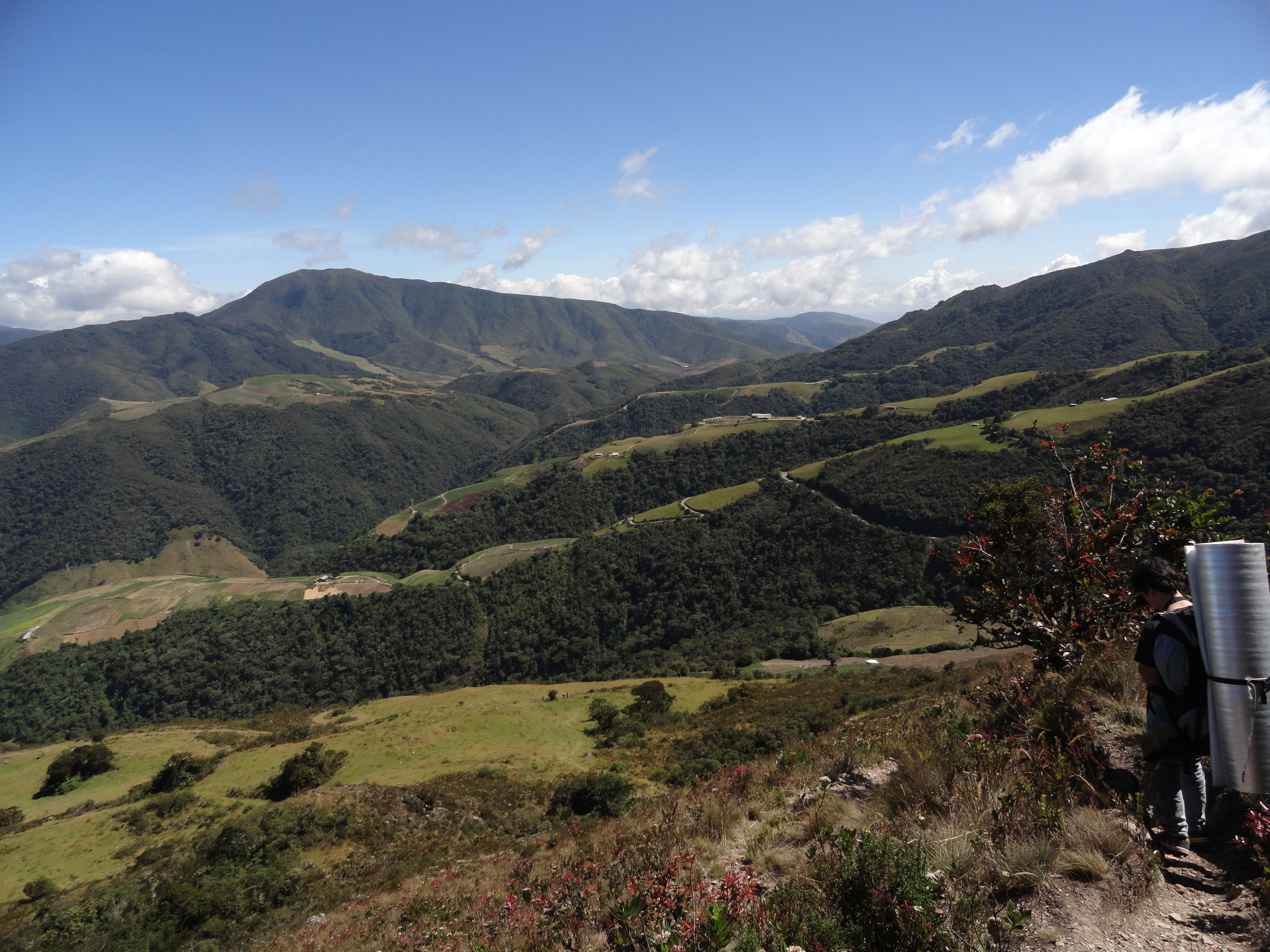
Temperate highland climate in Táchira

=== Group E: Alpine climates ===
It's characterized by average temperatures below 10 °C in all 12 months of the year:

- Alpine tundra (ETH)

Also known as páramo climate, this climate often undergo a sudden and drastic change in daily-weather in which they fluctuate between temperatures from below freezing to as high as 20 °C. Mean annual temperatures range from 2 °C (36 °F) to 10 °C (50 °F). It is located above the 3,000 m in the Sierra de Perija and Cordillera de Mérida. Snowfall is possible above 3,800 meters but becomes more noticeable around 4,200 meters, especially during the rainy season from late May to early October. This coincides with the peak activity of the Intertropical Convergence Zone, bringing humid air from the southeast of the Mérida Cordillera, originating from the Venezuelan Llanos, and from the south of Lake Maracaibo Lowlands, which contribute moisture to the region. The most popular village with this climate in the country is the town of Apartaderos

- Alpine glacier (EFH)

This climate is reserved to the highest peaks of the Venezuelan Andes, such as Pico Bolívar, Pico Humboldt, Pico Bonpland, among others, where exposed rocky surfaces and patches of glaciers remain from the last Pleistocene glaciation, known locally as Mérida glaciation. Snowfall typically occurs during the rainy season, from late May to early October, further accentuating the frigid conditions of these high altitudes.

Alpine climates of Venezuela

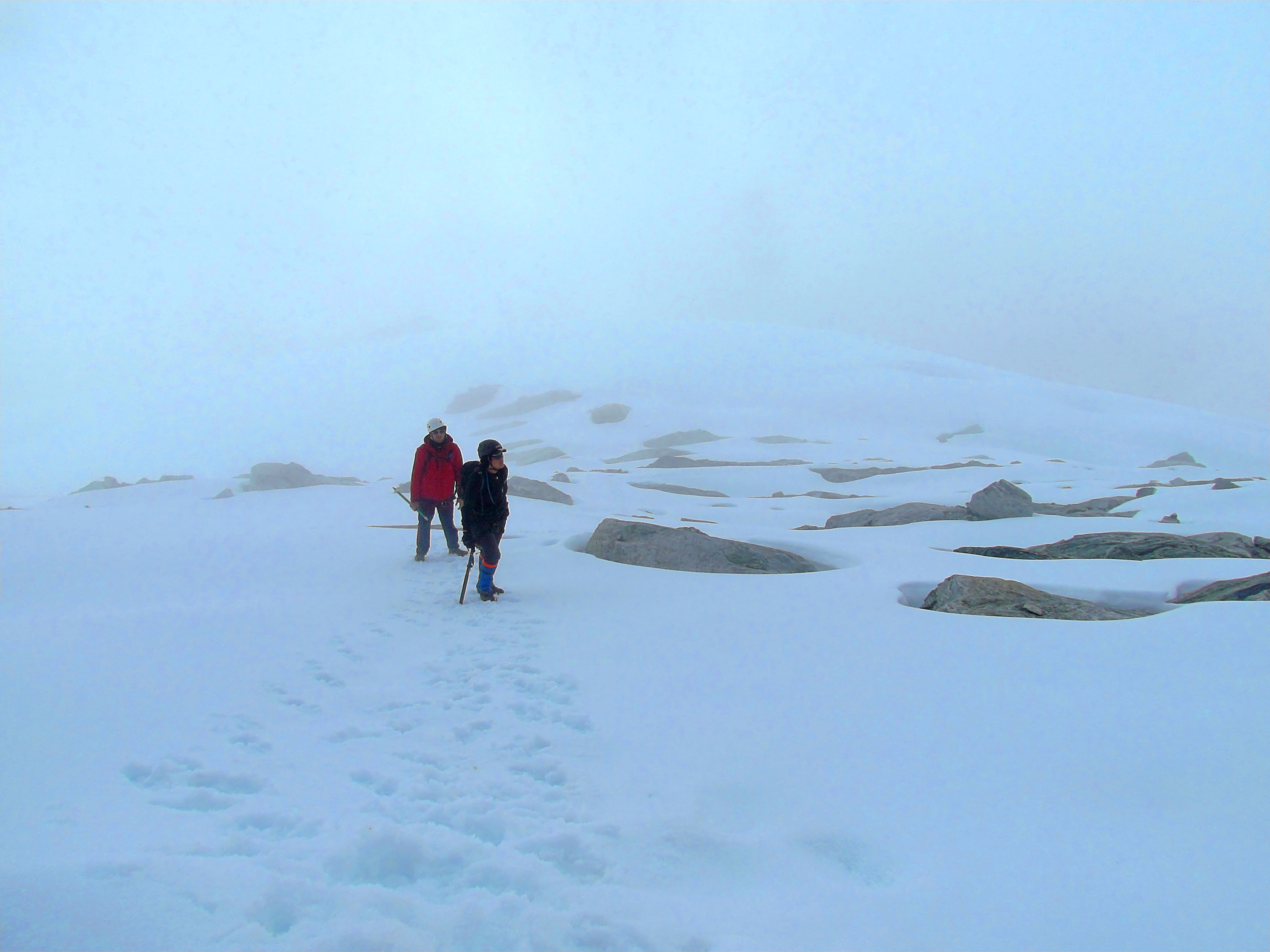
Alpine glacier in the Pico Humboldt

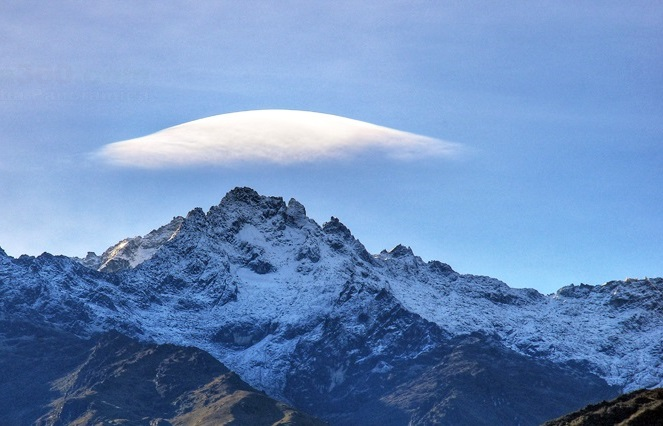
Alpine glacier in the Pico Bolívar

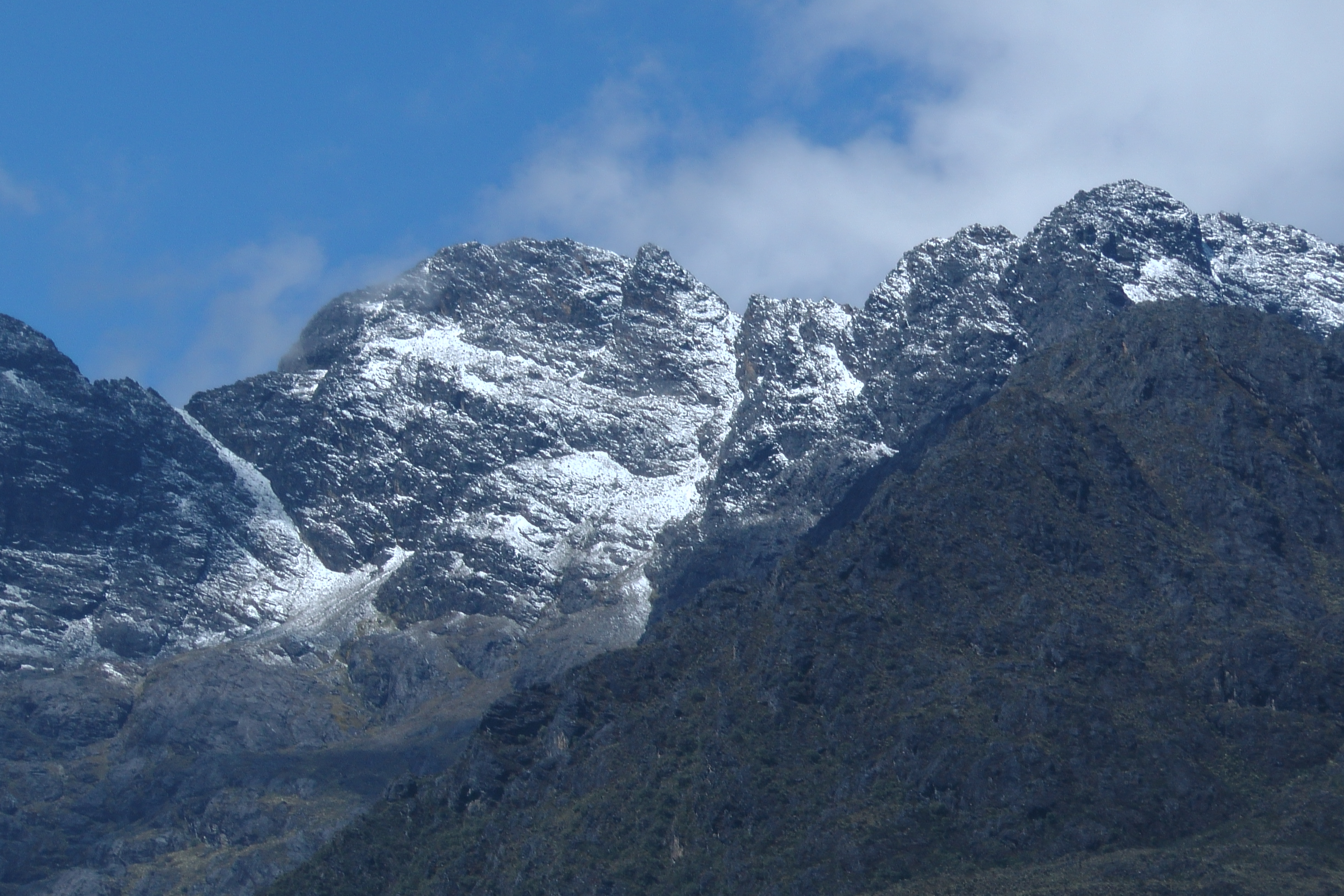
Alpine glacier climate in Pico La Concha

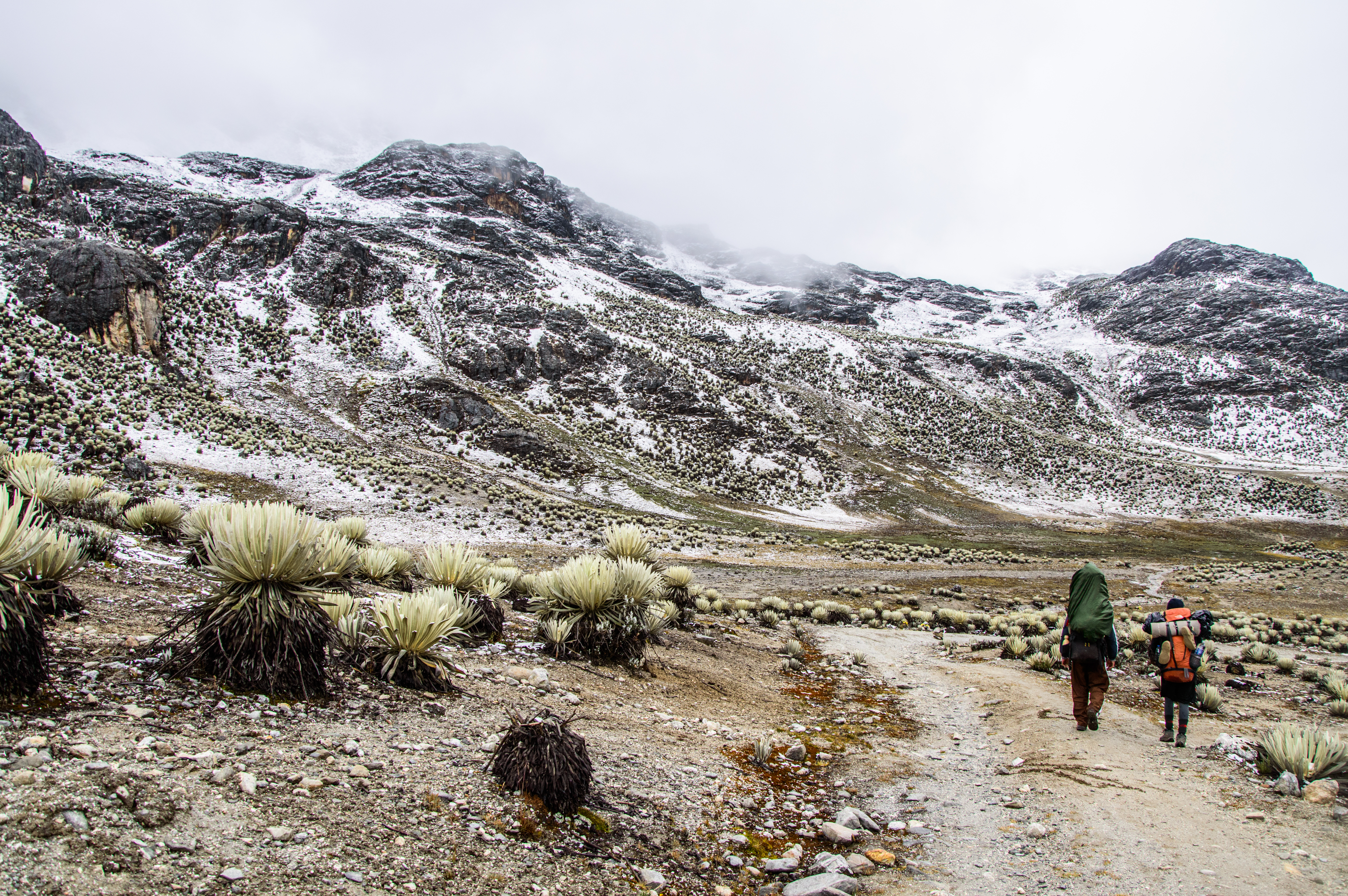
Alpine tundra climate in Sierra de La Culata

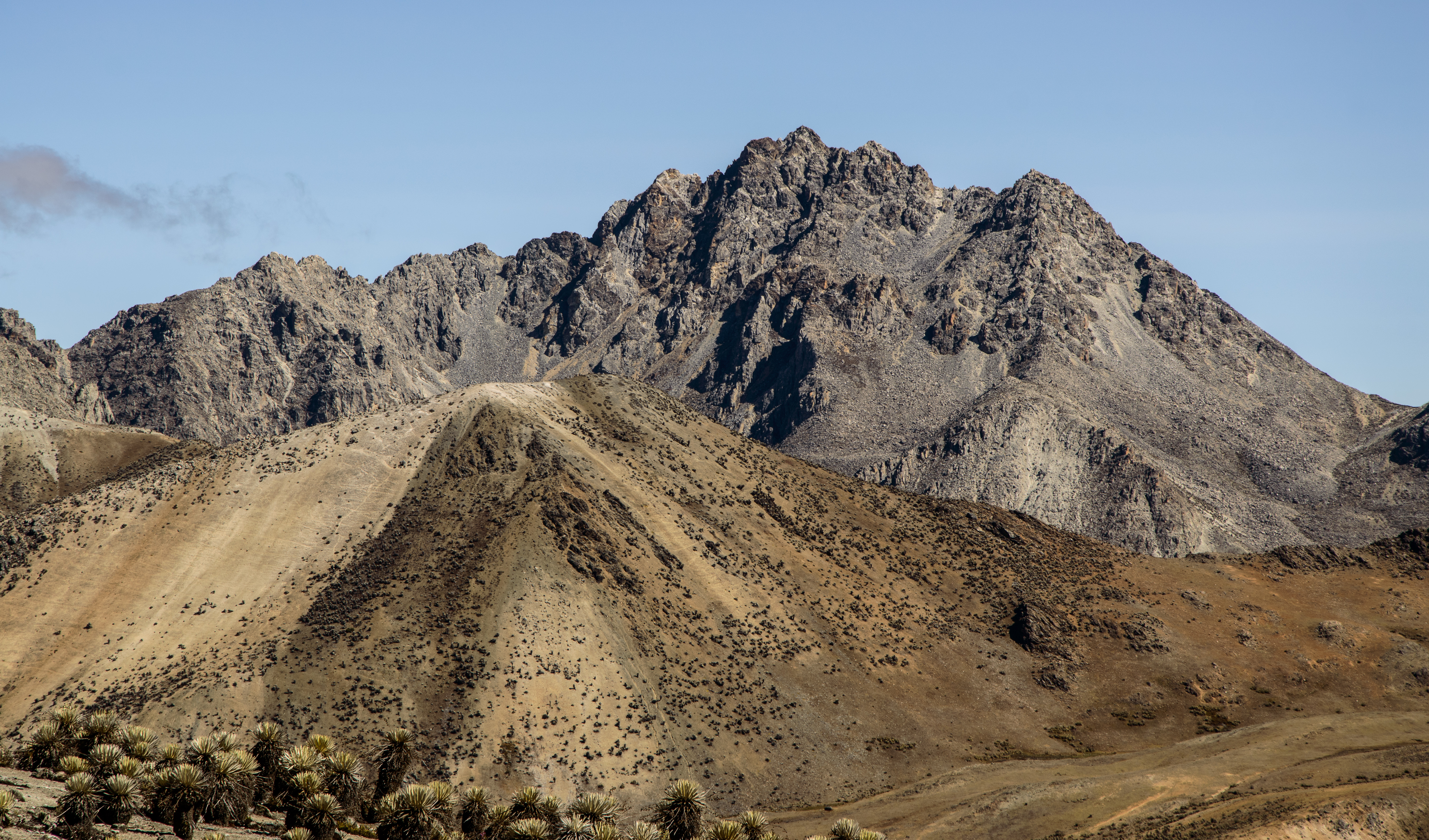
Alpine tundra climate in Pico Piedras Blancas

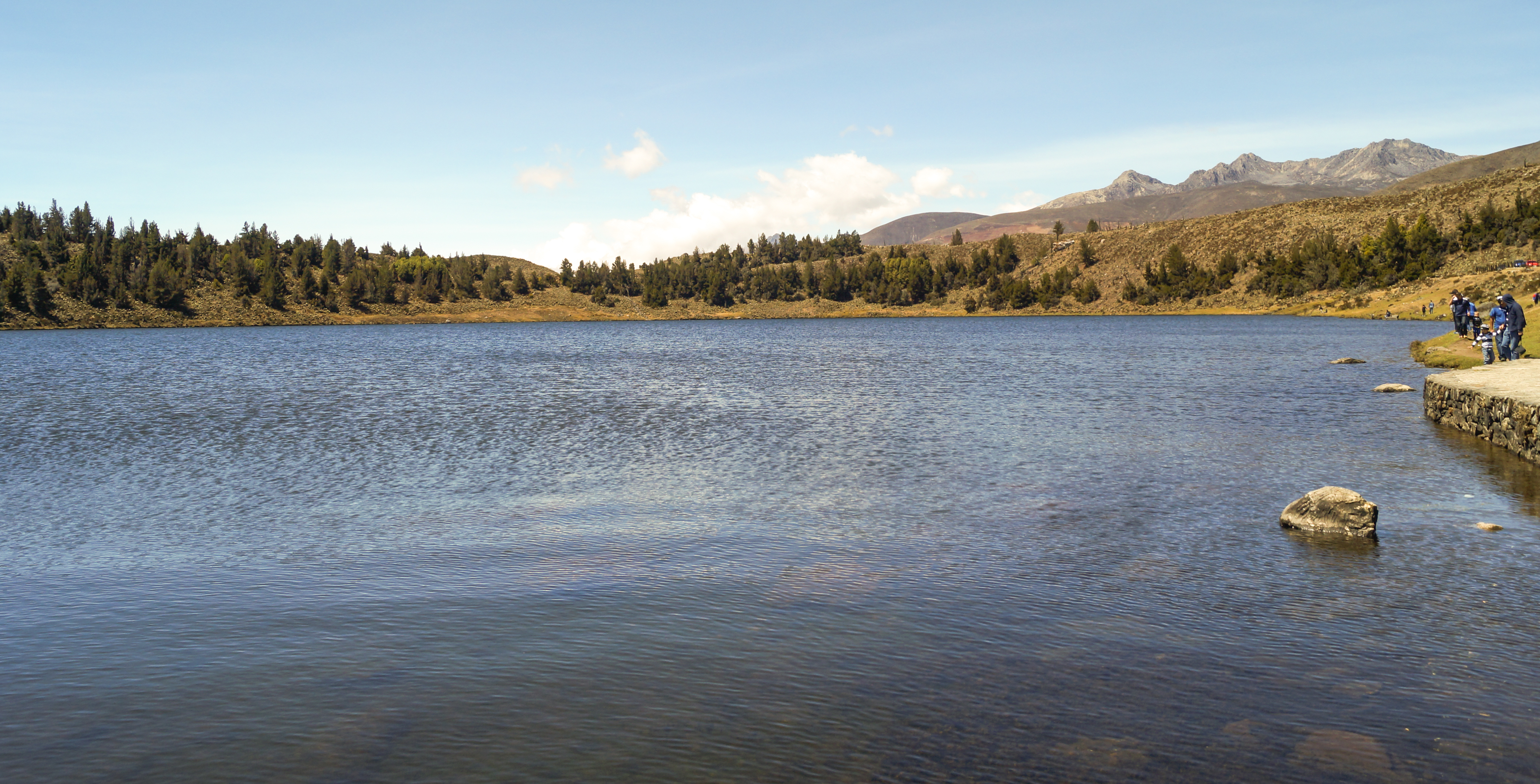
Alpina tundra at Laguna de Mucubají

Alpine tundra at Laguna Coromoto

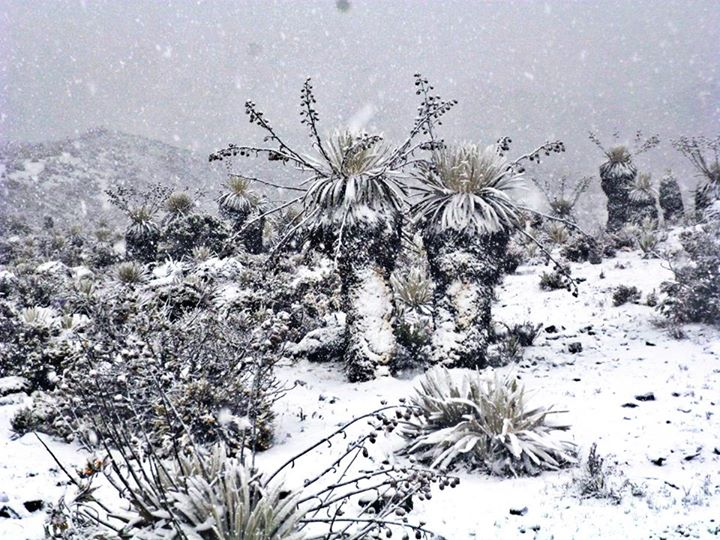
Snow in Mérida

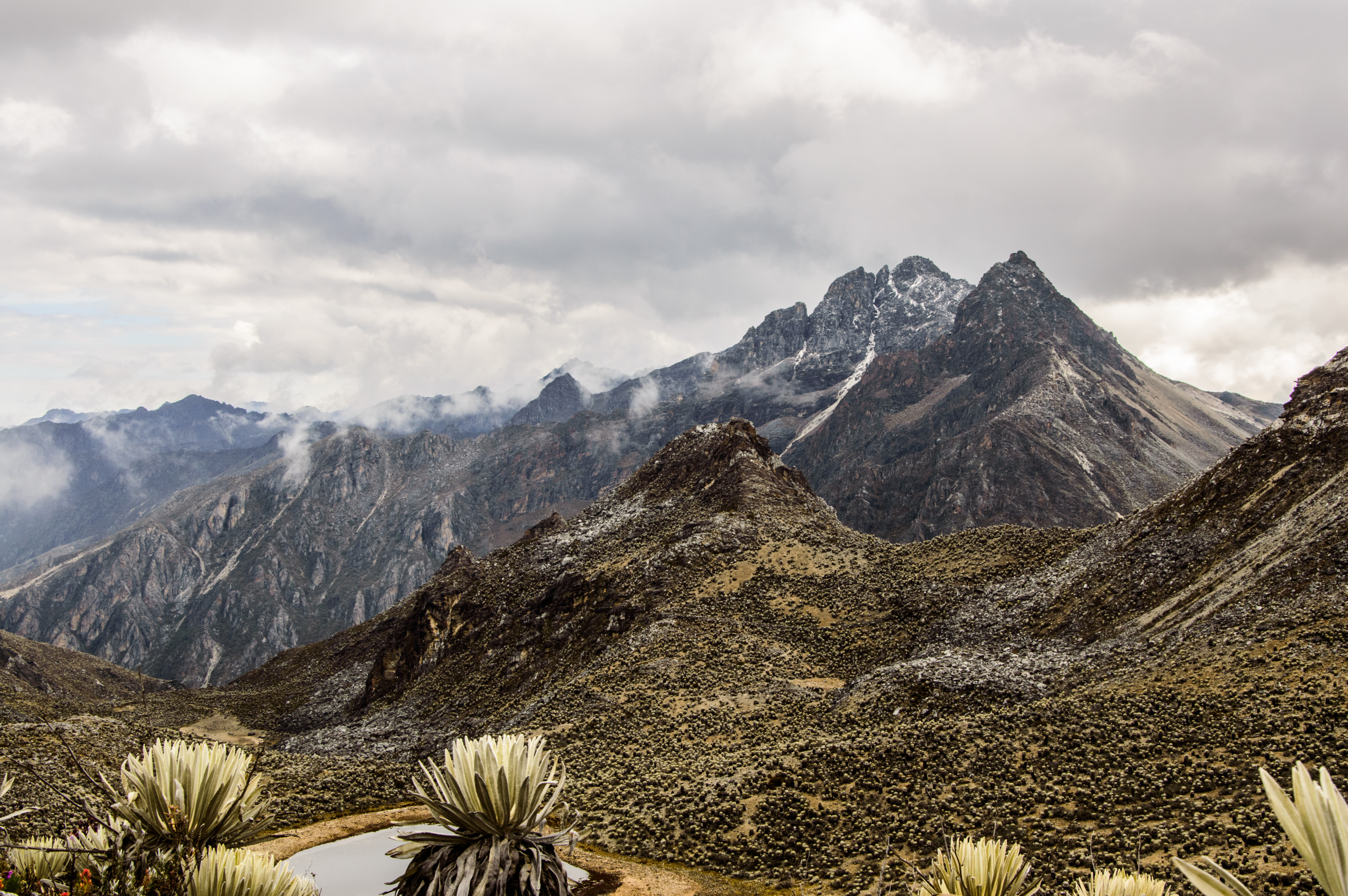
Alpina tundra at Mifafí Valley

== Climate zones according to altitude ==
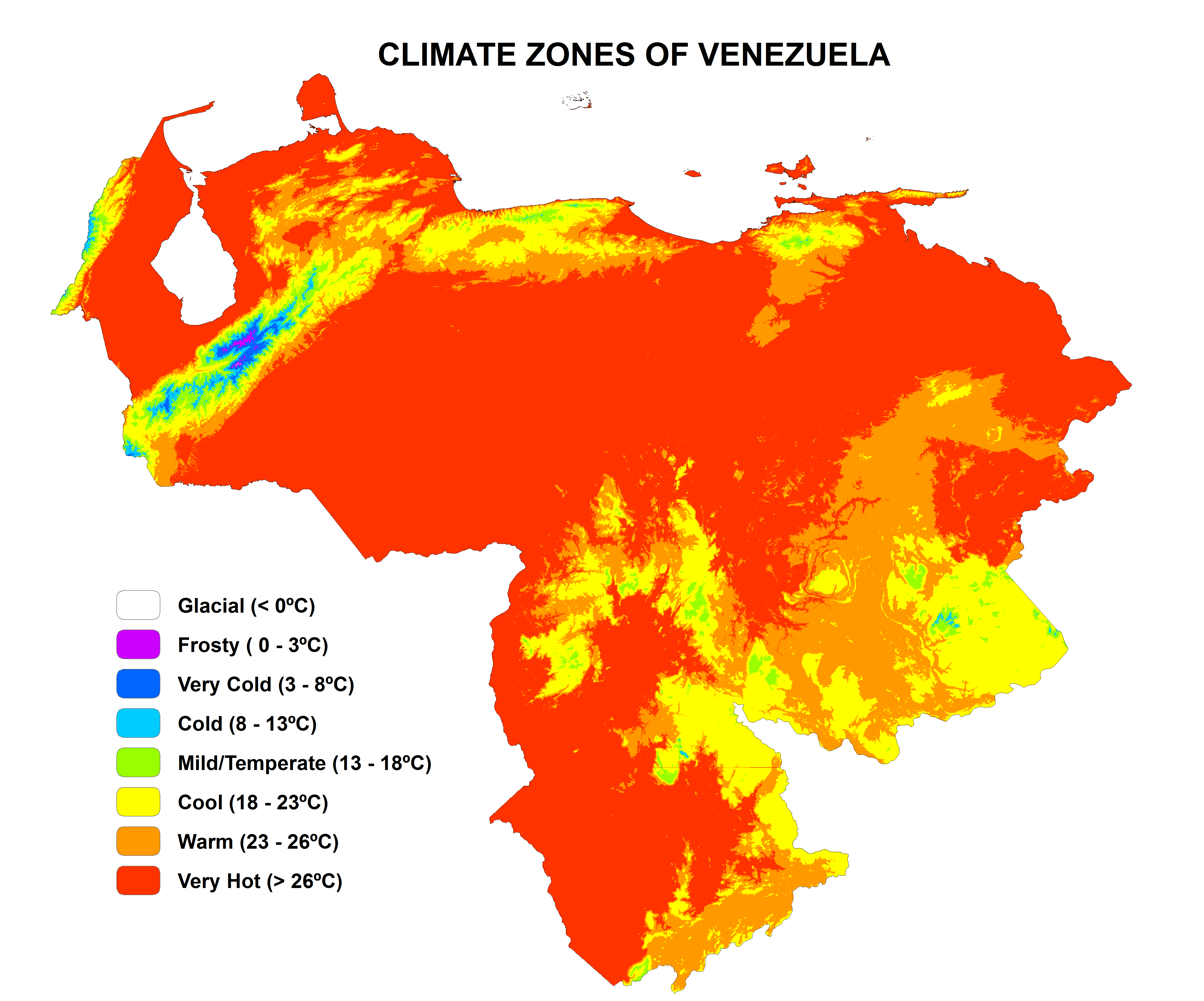
Venezuelan climatic types, according to their thermal floors.

Venezuelan climates are structured in "thermal floors", as mentioned next:

=== Very Hot ===
This climate is characterized by very hot temperatures above 26 °C (79 °F), with precipitations that ranges from dry (less than 300 mm) to pluvial (more than 3300 mm) conditions. This climate can be found in areas below 300 m in sedimentary basins and lowlands such as the Llanos, Orinoco Delta, Maracaibo Basin, Orinoco Basin, and coastal plains and islands; it comprises almost all the country. This climate zone is present in cities like Maracaibo, Punto Fijo, Ciudad Guayana, Porlamar, Puerto La Cruz, Barinas, Tucupita, Cumaná, Maturin, Anaco, Ciudad Bolívar, Cabimas, El Vigía and others.

Climate data for Maracaibo (1991–2020, extremes 1961–2020)
Month	Jan	Feb	Mar	Apr	May	Jun	Jul	Aug	Sep	Oct	Nov	Dec	Year
Record high °C (°F)	36.7 (98.1)	39.4 (102.9)	39.0 (102.2)	40.0 (104.0)	39.8 (103.6)	39.6 (103.3)	39.4 (102.9)	42.2 (108.0)	39.0 (102.2)	39.9 (103.8)	37.0 (98.6)	39.5 (103.1)	42.2 (108.0)
Mean daily maximum °C (°F)	33.1 (91.6)	33.3 (91.9)	33.7 (92.7)	34.0 (93.2)	34.2 (93.6)	34.5 (94.1)	34.8 (94.6)	35.1 (95.2)	34.2 (93.6)	33.1 (91.6)	32.7 (90.9)	32.9 (91.2)	33.8 (92.8)
Daily mean °C (°F)	27.0 (80.6)	27.3 (81.1)	27.9 (82.2)	28.7 (83.7)	28.7 (83.7)	29.4 (84.9)	29.4 (84.9)	29.8 (85.6)	28.9 (84.0)	27.9 (82.2)	27.0 (80.6)	27.3 (81.1)	28.3 (82.9)
Mean daily minimum °C (°F)	23.1 (73.6)	23.4 (74.1)	24.1 (75.4)	25.2 (77.4)	25.7 (78.3)	25.7 (78.3)	25.6 (78.1)	25.9 (78.6)	25.5 (77.9)	24.9 (76.8)	24.6 (76.3)	23.8 (74.8)	24.8 (76.6)
Record low °C (°F)	19.2 (66.6)	18.8 (65.8)	20.3 (68.5)	20.7 (69.3)	20.5 (68.9)	20.2 (68.4)	21.0 (69.8)	20.2 (68.4)	20.2 (68.4)	19.8 (67.6)	20.1 (68.2)	18.9 (66.0)	18.8 (65.8)
Average rainfall mm (inches)	5.8 (0.23)	3.6 (0.14)	11.4 (0.45)	41.1 (1.62)	85.5 (3.37)	48.6 (1.91)	31.3 (1.23)	70.1 (2.76)	114.9 (4.52)	122.9 (4.84)	82.3 (3.24)	31.8 (1.25)	649.3 (25.56)
Average rainy days (≥ 1.0 mm)	1.1	1.0	1.5	4.4	7.2	5.4	4.1	6.8	10.5	11.1	7.0	2.9	63.0
Average relative humidity (%)	69.0	68.5	68.0	71.5	73.5	71.0	69.0	69.5	72.0	75.0	73.0	72.0	71.0
Mean monthly sunshine hours	266.6	240.8	244.9	183.0	179.8	201.0	244.9	232.5	192.0	182.9	204.0	238.7	2,611.1
Mean daily sunshine hours	8.6	8.6	7.9	6.1	5.8	6.7	7.9	7.5	6.4	5.9	6.8	7.7	7.2
Source 1: NOAA (sun 1961–1990)
Source 2: Instituto Nacional de Meteorología e Hidrología (humidity 1970–1998)

=== Warm ===
Warm climate can be found between 300 and 650 m. It's characterized by temperatures from 23 °C (73 °F) to 26 °C (79 °F) and precipitations that ranges from scarcely rainy (300 – 700 mm) to pluvial (more than 3300 mm) conditions. This climate can be found in lower foothills and plateaus in the Guiana Highlands, Venezuelan Coastal Range, Coro region and Venezuelan Andes. Cities which have this climate zone are Barquisimeto, Maracay, Valencia, Guarenas-Guatire, San Juan de Los Morros, Charallave, Valera, Barinitas, San Antonio del Táchira, Quibor and others.

Climate data for Barquisimeto, Venezuela (1991–2020 normals, extremes 1971–2020)
Month	Jan	Feb	Mar	Apr	May	Jun	Jul	Aug	Sep	Oct	Nov	Dec	Year
Record high °C (°F)	38.0 (100.4)	36.6 (97.9)	39.4 (102.9)	35.9 (96.6)	35.6 (96.1)	35.9 (96.6)	35.9 (96.6)	39.6 (103.3)	36.3 (97.3)	34.8 (94.6)	35.2 (95.4)	33.9 (93.0)	39.6 (103.3)
Mean daily maximum °C (°F)	30.9 (87.6)	31.8 (89.2)	32.3 (90.1)	31.8 (89.2)	31.3 (88.3)	30.6 (87.1)	30.4 (86.7)	31.1 (88.0)	31.5 (88.7)	30.9 (87.6)	30.7 (87.3)	30.5 (86.9)	31.1 (88.0)
Daily mean °C (°F)	23.5 (74.3)	24.0 (75.2)	24.7 (76.5)	25.1 (77.2)	25.0 (77.0)	24.3 (75.7)	24.0 (75.2)	24.3 (75.7)	24.7 (76.5)	24.5 (76.1)	24.3 (75.7)	23.8 (74.8)	24.4 (75.9)
Mean daily minimum °C (°F)	19.1 (66.4)	19.4 (66.9)	20.3 (68.5)	21.4 (70.5)	21.6 (70.9)	21.2 (70.2)	20.9 (69.6)	21.0 (69.8)	21.2 (70.2)	21.2 (70.2)	21.0 (69.8)	20.0 (68.0)	20.7 (69.3)
Record low °C (°F)	13.4 (56.1)	13.2 (55.8)	12.6 (54.7)	15.2 (59.4)	16.5 (61.7)	16.1 (61.0)	16.4 (61.5)	15.4 (59.7)	15.4 (59.7)	11.1 (52.0)	15.0 (59.0)	13.8 (56.8)	11.1 (52.0)
Average rainfall mm (inches)	12.1 (0.48)	9.7 (0.38)	18.6 (0.73)	52.1 (2.05)	59.2 (2.33)	75.5 (2.97)	61.6 (2.43)	56.3 (2.22)	50.7 (2.00)	72.1 (2.84)	58.1 (2.29)	39.8 (1.57)	565.8 (22.28)
Average rainy days (≥ 1.0 mm)	2.4	1.5	2.3	6.2	7.6	11.6	10.4	8.9	7.0	8.8	6.2	5.4	78.3
Average relative humidity (%)	68.5	66.5	65.5	70.0	74.0	75.0	74.5	73.0	72.5	73.0	73.0	72.0	71.5
Mean monthly sunshine hours	260.4	235.2	241.8	183.0	192.2	201.0	232.5	241.8	228.0	226.3	222.0	248.0	2,712.2
Mean daily sunshine hours	8.4	8.4	7.8	6.1	6.2	6.7	7.5	7.8	7.6	7.3	7.4	8.0	7.4
Source 1: NOAA (sun 1971–1990)
Source 2: Instituto Nacional de Meteorología e Hidrología (humidity 1970–1998)

=== Cool ===
This climate features temperatures between 18 °C (64 °F) to 23 °C (73 °F) and precipitations that ranges from scarcely rainy (300 – 700 mm) to pluvial (more than 3300 mm) conditions. It can be found in the country's mountainous areas between 650 and 1,350-1,600 m This climate zone is present in cities like Mérida, San Cristóbal, Caracas, Sanare, Villa de Cura, Ejido, Trujillo, Escuque, Rubio, Tovar, Boconó, Duaca, Bejuma, Los Teques, Nirgua, Santa Elena de Uairen, among others.

Climate data for Mérida 1,599 m (5,246 ft) 1991–2020 normals, extremes 1961–2020
Month	Jan	Feb	Mar	Apr	May	Jun	Jul	Aug	Sep	Oct	Nov	Dec	Year
Record high °C (°F)	30.1 (86.2)	34.1 (93.4)	31.3 (88.3)	31.7 (89.1)	30.8 (87.4)	31.0 (87.8)	33.8 (92.8)	31.7 (89.1)	32.0 (89.6)	32.0 (89.6)	30.6 (87.1)	28.9 (84.0)	34.1 (93.4)
Mean daily maximum °C (°F)	26.1 (79.0)	26.8 (80.2)	26.7 (80.1)	26.5 (79.7)	26.7 (80.1)	26.3 (79.3)	26.4 (79.5)	27.1 (80.8)	27.1 (80.8)	26.4 (79.5)	25.9 (78.6)	25.9 (78.6)	26.5 (79.7)
Daily mean °C (°F)	19.1 (66.4)	19.6 (67.3)	20.1 (68.2)	20.3 (68.5)	20.5 (68.9)	20.2 (68.4)	20.0 (68.0)	20.4 (68.7)	20.3 (68.5)	19.9 (67.8)	19.6 (67.3)	19.3 (66.7)	19.9 (67.8)
Mean daily minimum °C (°F)	14.9 (58.8)	15.3 (59.5)	16.2 (61.2)	16.9 (62.4)	17.0 (62.6)	16.6 (61.9)	16.3 (61.3)	16.5 (61.7)	16.5 (61.7)	16.6 (61.9)	16.4 (61.5)	15.5 (59.9)	16.2 (61.2)
Record low °C (°F)	10.3 (50.5)	10.3 (50.5)	12.2 (54.0)	12.8 (55.0)	13.7 (56.7)	10.2 (50.4)	10.0 (50.0)	12.8 (55.0)	6.4 (43.5)	13.4 (56.1)	12.5 (54.5)	10.0 (50.0)	6.4 (43.5)
Average precipitation mm (inches)	31.8 (1.25)	37.3 (1.47)	78.3 (3.08)	169.3 (6.67)	192.3 (7.57)	155.3 (6.11)	121.1 (4.77)	129.2 (5.09)	188.8 (7.43)	204.9 (8.07)	156.4 (6.16)	70.8 (2.79)	1,535.5 (60.45)
Average precipitation days (≥ 1.0 mm)	5.6	5.3	9.1	14.9	16.8	16.3	15.6	15.0	16.3	17.1	14.0	8.1	154.1
Average relative humidity (%)	71.5	71.0	72.0	75.5	76.0	76.0	74.0	73.5	73.5	76.0	76.5	73.5	74.1
Mean monthly sunshine hours	257.3	224.0	226.3	177.0	192.2	180.0	213.9	213.9	201.0	192.2	198.0	235.6	2,511.4
Mean daily sunshine hours	8.3	8.0	7.3	5.9	6.2	6.0	6.9	6.9	6.7	6.2	6.6	7.6	6.9
Source 1: NOAA (sun 1961–1990)
Source 2: Instituto Nacional de Meteorología e Hidrología (humidity 1970–1998)

=== Mild/Temperate ===
Mild or Temperate climate can be found in the mountainous areas between 1,350-1,600 to 2,400 m. It features temperatures around 13 °C (55 °F) to 18 °C (64 °F) and precipitations that ranges from scarcely rainy (300 – 700 mm) to pluvial (more than 3300 mm) conditions. This climate zone is present in cities like Mérida (higher part), Colonia Tovar, San Antonio de Los Altos, El Jarillo, El Junquito, Galipan, Timotes, La Grita, Tabay, La Mucuy and others; most of the top of the tepuis also present this climate.

Climate data for Colonia Tovar, Venezuela (1991-2020)
Month	Jan	Feb	Mar	Apr	May	Jun	Jul	Aug	Sep	Oct	Nov	Dec	Year
Record high °C (°F)	29.5 (85.1)	25.6 (78.1)	26.7 (80.1)	27.3 (81.1)	29.0 (84.2)	25.8 (78.4)	25.5 (77.9)	26.2 (79.2)	26.7 (80.1)	26.2 (79.2)	24.7 (76.5)	25.8 (78.4)	29.5 (85.1)
Mean daily maximum °C (°F)	20.9 (69.6)	21.4 (70.5)	22.0 (71.6)	22.5 (72.5)	22.5 (72.5)	21.7 (71.1)	21.3 (70.3)	21.4 (70.5)	21.9 (71.4)	21.7 (71.1)	21.4 (70.5)	20.9 (69.6)	21.6 (70.9)
Daily mean °C (°F)	16.3 (61.3)	16.9 (62.4)	17.3 (63.1)	18.2 (64.8)	18.4 (65.1)	17.7 (63.9)	17.2 (63.0)	17.4 (63.3)	17.8 (64.0)	17.7 (63.9)	17.4 (63.3)	16.6 (61.9)	17.4 (63.3)
Mean daily minimum °C (°F)	10.9 (51.6)	11.1 (52.0)	11.8 (53.2)	13.4 (56.1)	14.6 (58.3)	14.1 (57.4)	13.6 (56.5)	13.9 (57.0)	14.4 (57.9)	14.1 (57.4)	13.6 (56.5)	12.1 (53.8)	13.1 (55.6)
Record low °C (°F)	6.8 (44.2)	6.7 (44.1)	4.2 (39.6)	8.9 (48.0)	9.2 (48.6)	10.9 (51.6)	7.1 (44.8)	8.2 (46.8)	9.8 (49.6)	9.4 (48.9)	9.1 (48.4)	6.5 (43.7)	4.2 (39.6)
Average precipitation mm (inches)	64.7 (2.55)	30.5 (1.20)	10.2 (0.40)	9.3 (0.37)	29.3 (1.15)	114.1 (4.49)	142.6 (5.61)	152.3 (6.00)	140.1 (5.52)	138.3 (5.44)	130.6 (5.14)	29.4 (1.16)	991.4 (39.03)
Average precipitation days (≥ 1 mm)	5.3	3.4	2.7	8.0	9.8	16.5	15.3	16.0	18.1	13.8	15.5	7.1	131.5
Source: NOAA

=== Cold ===
This climate is characterized by temperatures above 8 °C (46 °F) and below 13 °C (55 °F), with precipitations that ranges from scarcely rainy (300 – 700 mm) to pluvial (more than 3300 mm) conditions. This climate can be found in mountainous areas around 2,400 to 3,200 m specifically in Sierra de Perija, Cordillera de Mérida, higher elevations at Venezuelan Coastal Range and higher tepuis (Monte Roraima, Kukenan, Cerro Marahuaca, Chimantá Massif). This climate zone is present in towns like Mucuchíes, Chachopo and Los Nevados.

Climate data for Mucuchíes, Mérida, Venezuela
Month	Jan	Feb	Mar	Apr	May	Jun	Jul	Aug	Sep	Oct	Nov	Dec	Year
Mean daily maximum °C (°F)	18 (64)	18.5 (65.3)	18.1 (64.6)	17.5 (63.5)	17.3 (63.1)	16.7 (62.1)	16.6 (61.9)	17.1 (62.8)	17.4 (63.3)	17.2 (63.0)	17.3 (63.1)	18 (64)	17.5 (63.4)
Daily mean °C (°F)	10.7 (51.3)	11.4 (52.5)	11.6 (52.9)	11.8 (53.2)	12.1 (53.8)	11.9 (53.4)	11.6 (52.9)	11.8 (53.2)	11.9 (53.4)	11.8 (53.2)	11.4 (52.5)	11.1 (52.0)	11.6 (52.9)
Mean daily minimum °C (°F)	3.5 (38.3)	4.3 (39.7)	5.2 (41.4)	6.2 (43.2)	7 (45)	7.1 (44.8)	6.6 (43.9)	6.5 (43.7)	6.4 (43.5)	6.4 (43.5)	5.5 (41.9)	4.3 (39.7)	5.7 (42.4)
Average precipitation mm (inches)	14 (0.6)	13 (0.5)	24 (0.9)	103 (4.1)	117 (4.6)	98 (3.9)	89 (3.5)	92 (3.6)	88 (3.5)	103 (4.1)	64 (2.5)	18 (0.7)	823 (32.5)
Average rainy days	6	6	9	17	18	18	18	20	19	18	13	10	172
Mean daily sunshine hours	8	7	6	5	4	4	5	5	5	5	5	7	6
Source 1: Climate-Data.org (altitude: 2899m)
Source 2: Weather2Travel (rainy days, sun)

=== Very Cold ===
This climate can be found in the Venezuelan Andes area, between 3,200 and 4,150 m. It's characterized by temperatures from 3 °C (37 °F) to 8 °C (46 °F) and precipitations that ranges from scarcely rainy (300 – 700 mm) to rainy (1800–2500 mm) conditions. This climate zone is present in towns like Apartaderos and Llano del Hato. The condition of this climate is also known as páramo.

=== Frosty ===
Frosty climate is found at the highest areas in Venezuelan Andes, between 4,150 and 4,700 m. where the temperatures are between 0 °C (32 °F) to 3 °C (37 °F). This climate zone is present exclusively at Sierra Nevada de Mérida, Sierra de La Culata and Sierra de Santo Domingo.

=== Glacial ===
This climate is characterized by average temperatures below 0 °C (32 °F) all year, it's located in the highest peaks of Venezuela in the Cordillera de Mérida such as Pico Bolívar, Pico Humboldt, Pico La Concha, Pico Bonpland, Pico Espejo, Pico Mucuñuque and Pico Piedras Blancas. Only Pico Bolivar and Pico Humboldt have their glaciers preserved, while the other peaks are exposed to nival zone conditions.

== Gallery of maps ==
=== Maps of climate zones according to Köppen ===
Koppen climate zones across Venezuela's natural regions

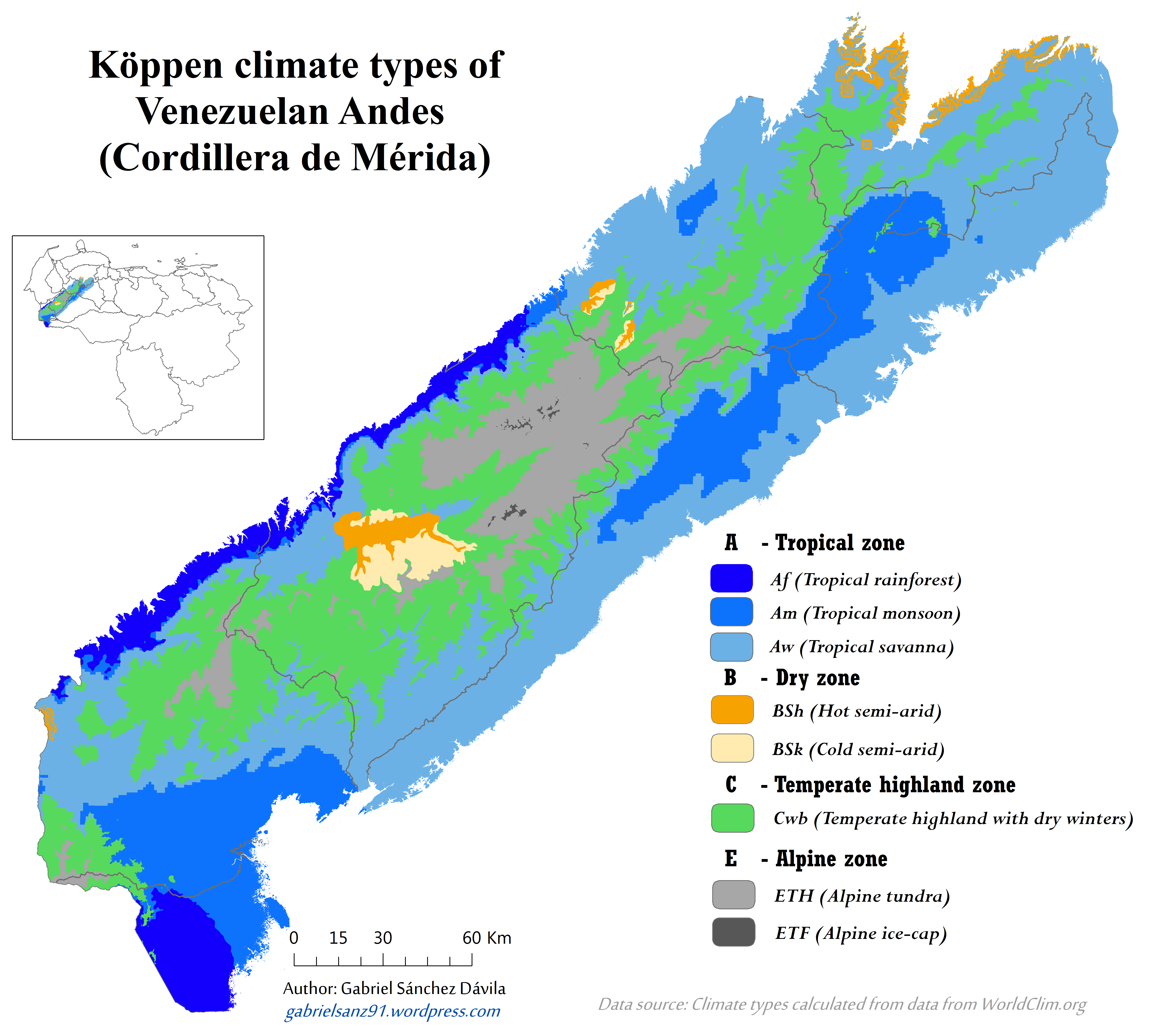
Venezuelan Andes (Mérida Cordillera)

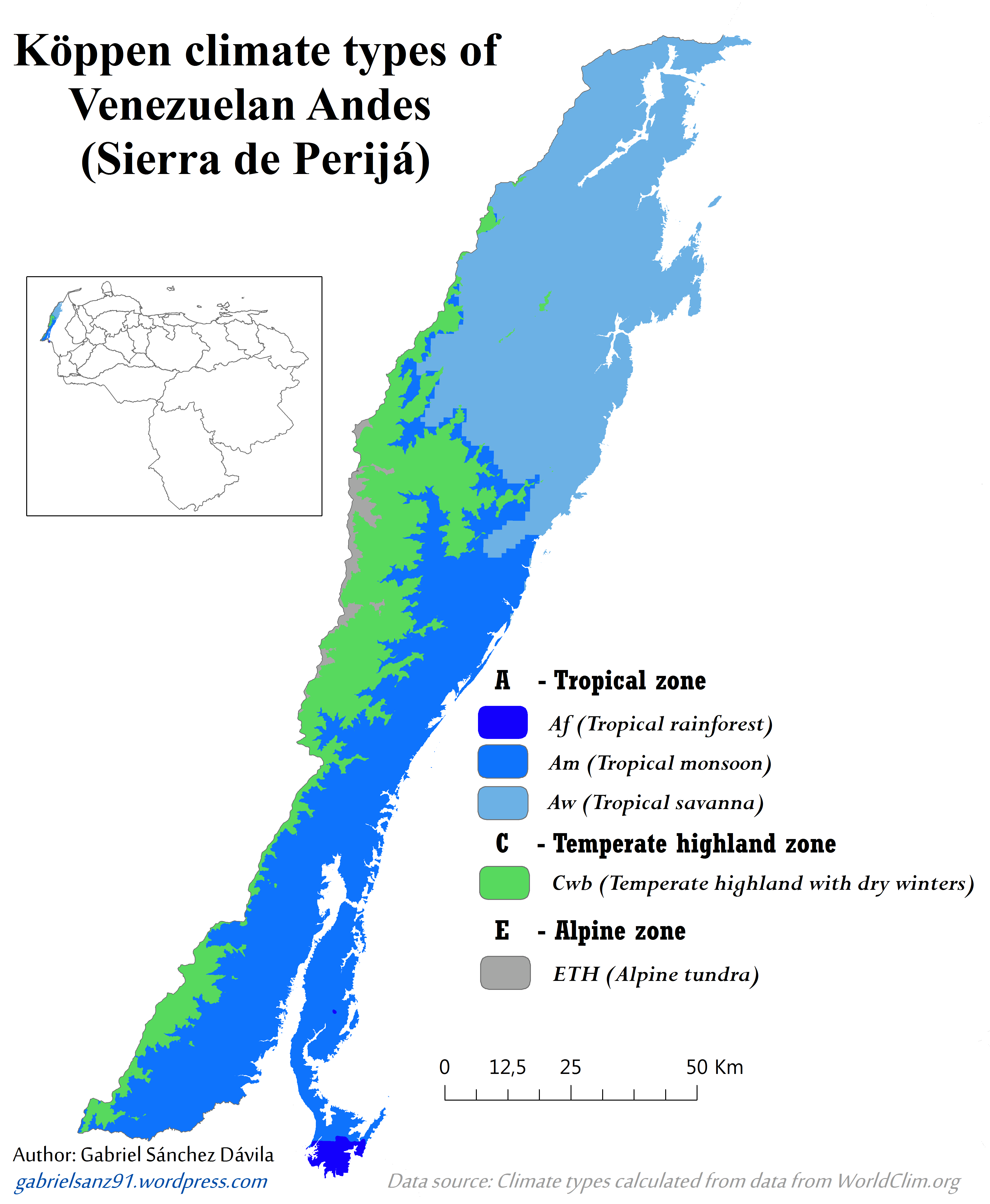
Venezuelan Andes (Sierra de Perijá)

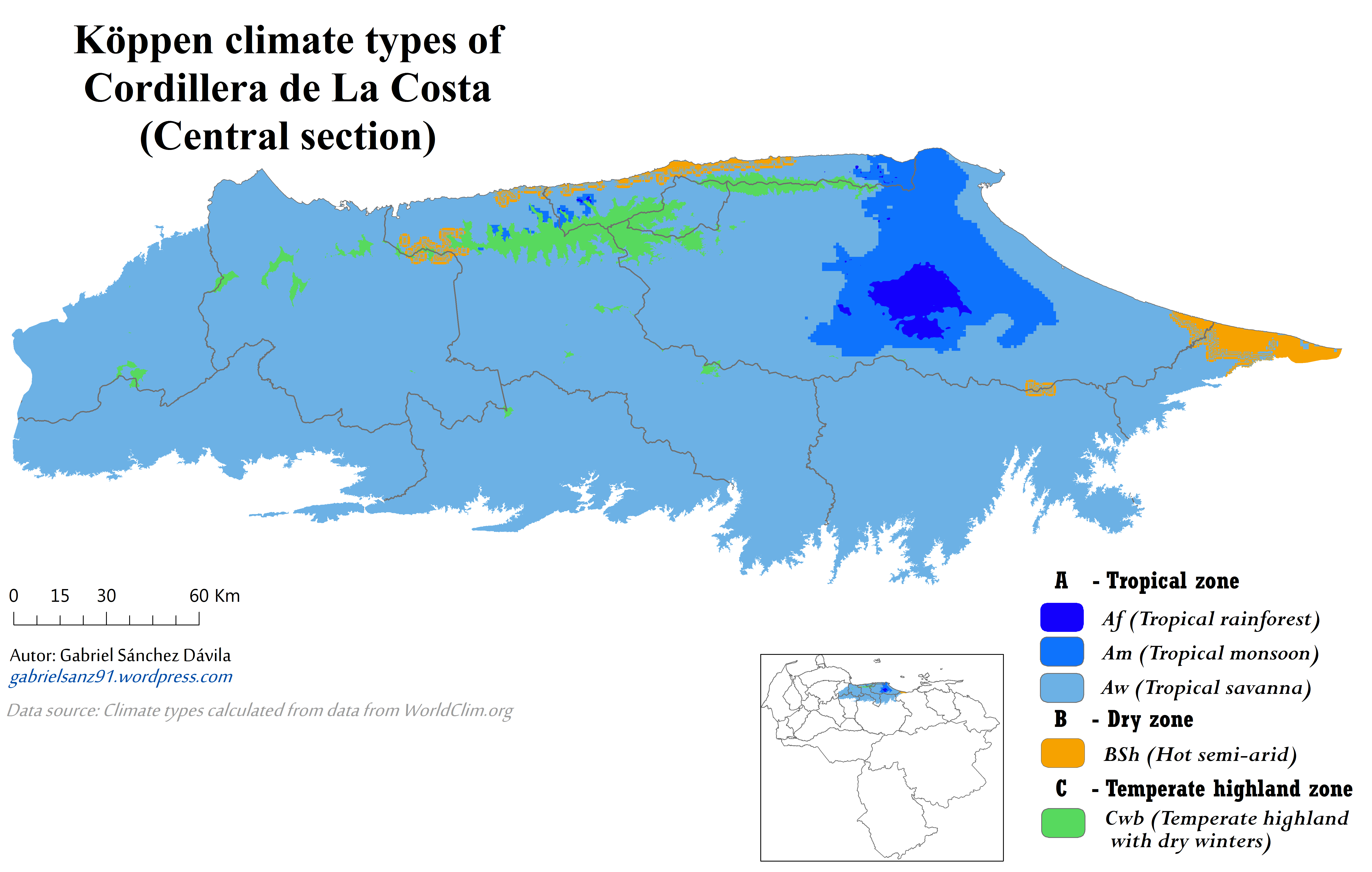
Central section (Venezuelan Coastal Range)

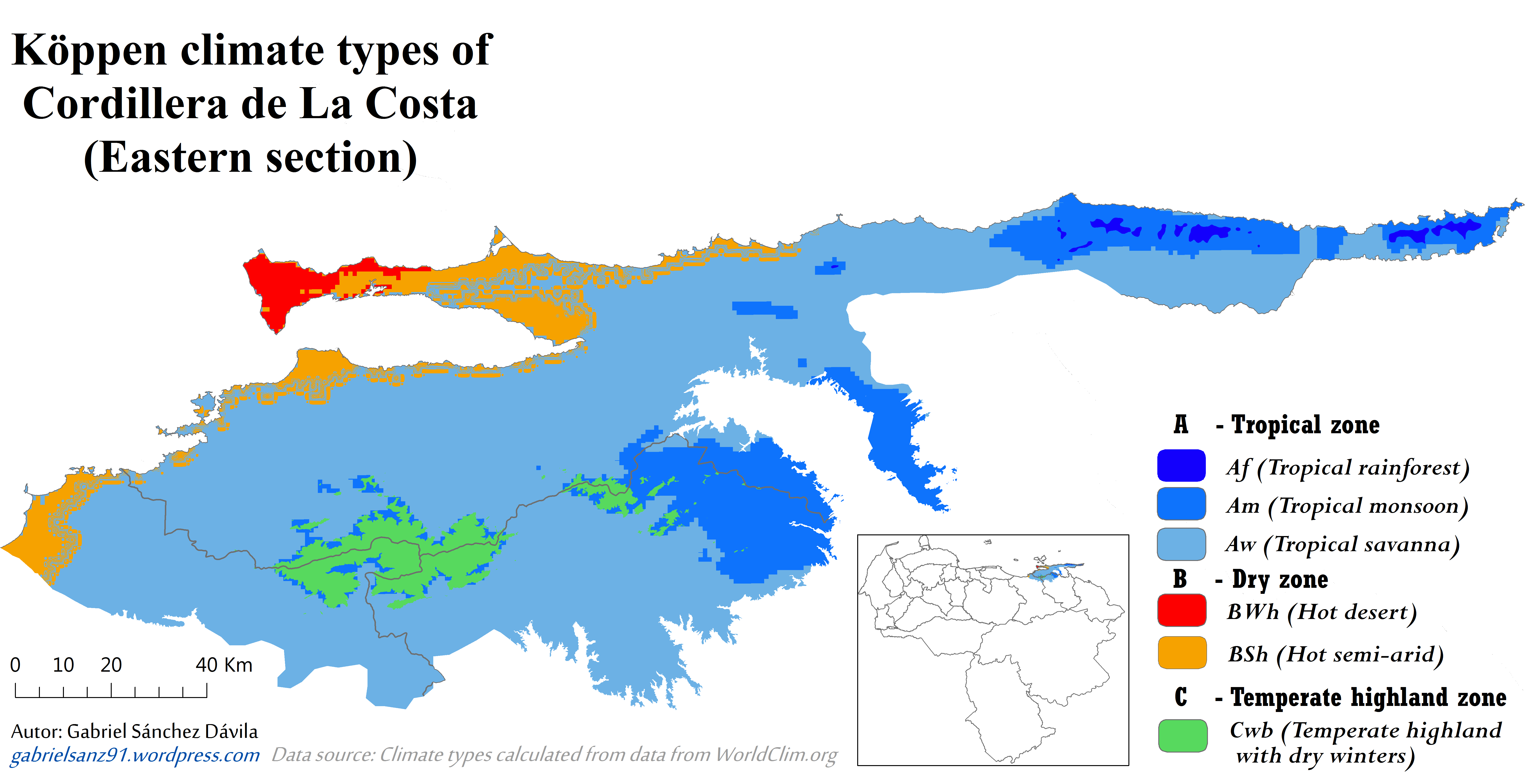
Eastern section (Venezuelan Coastal Range)

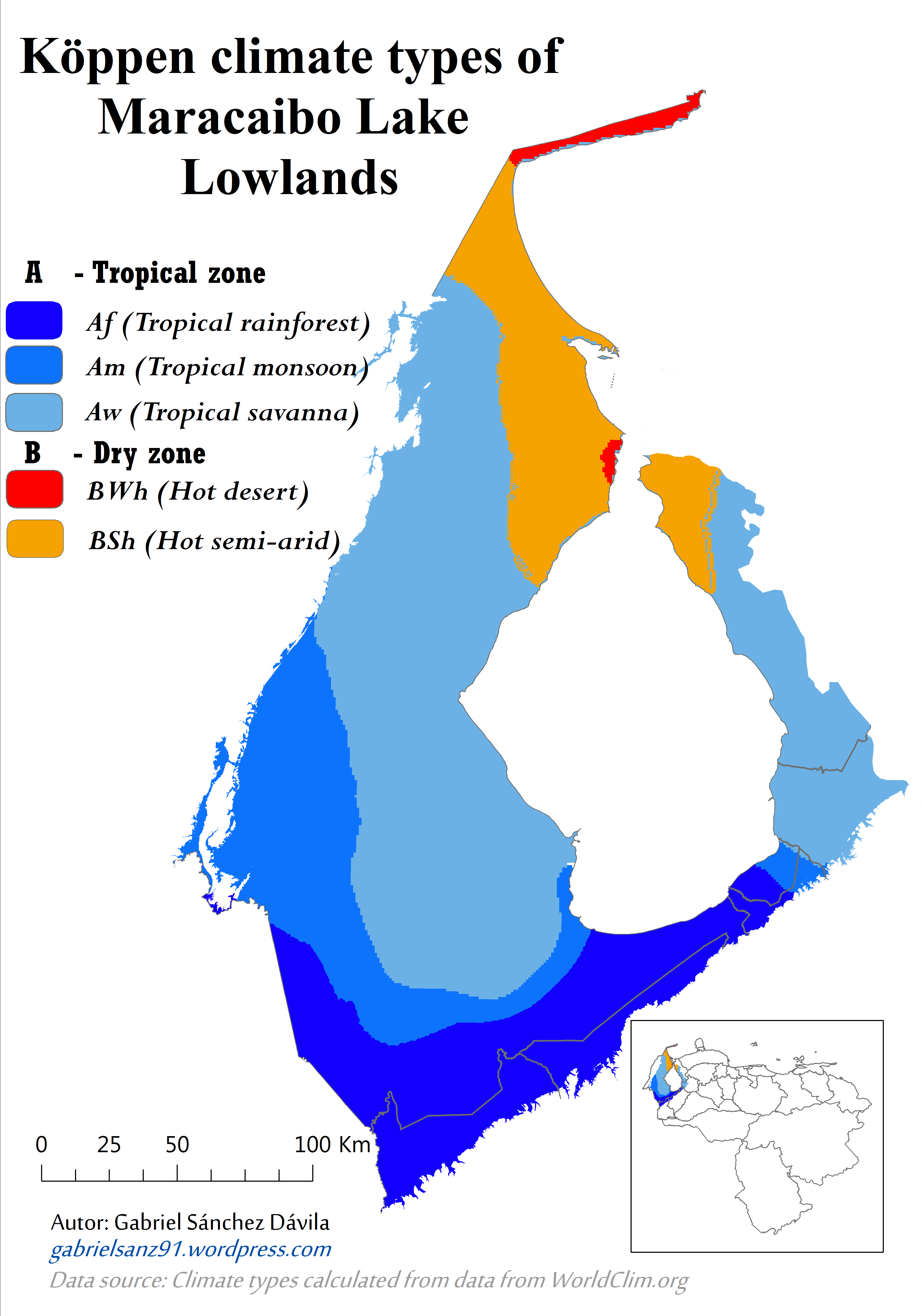
Maracaibo Lowlands

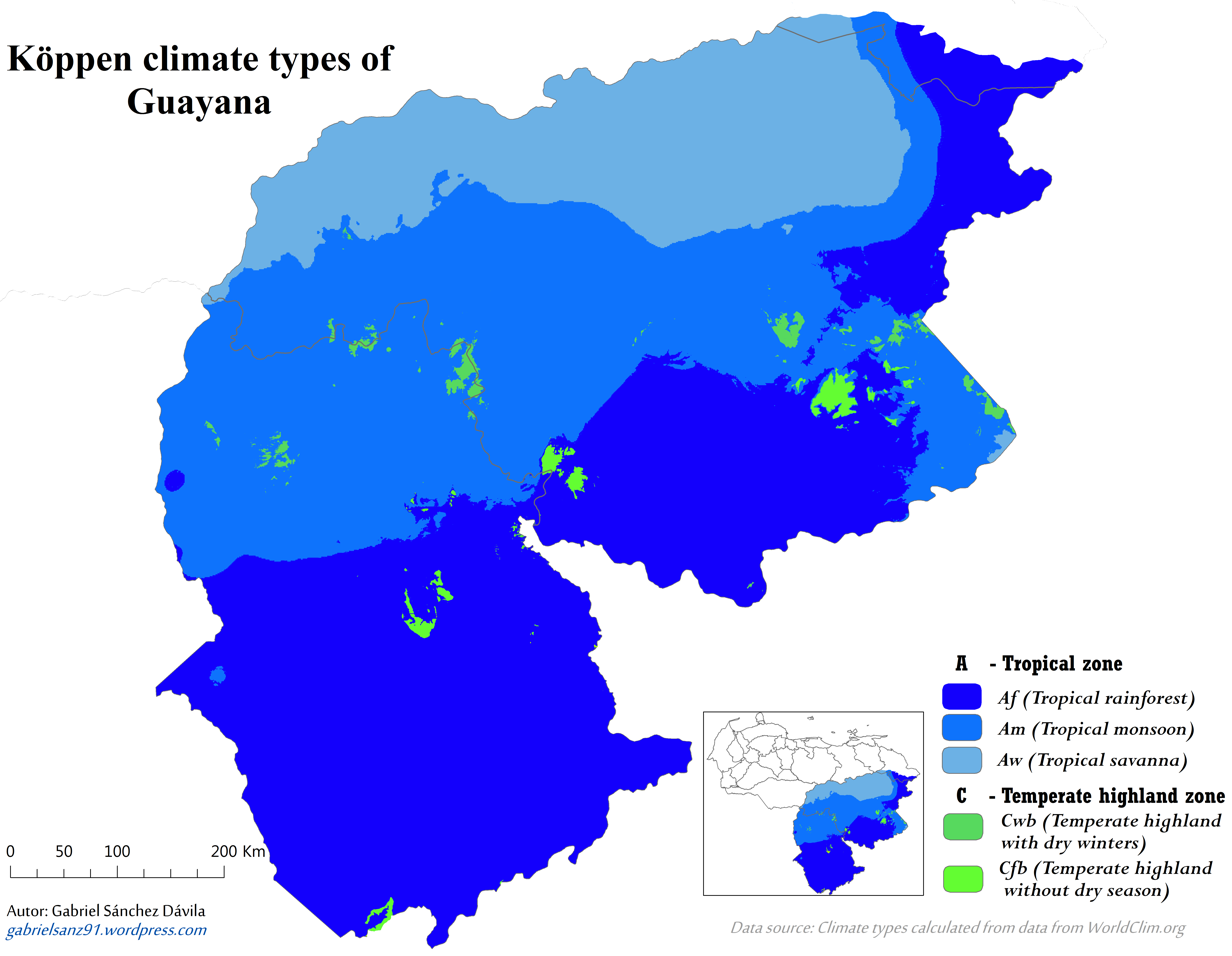
Guayana

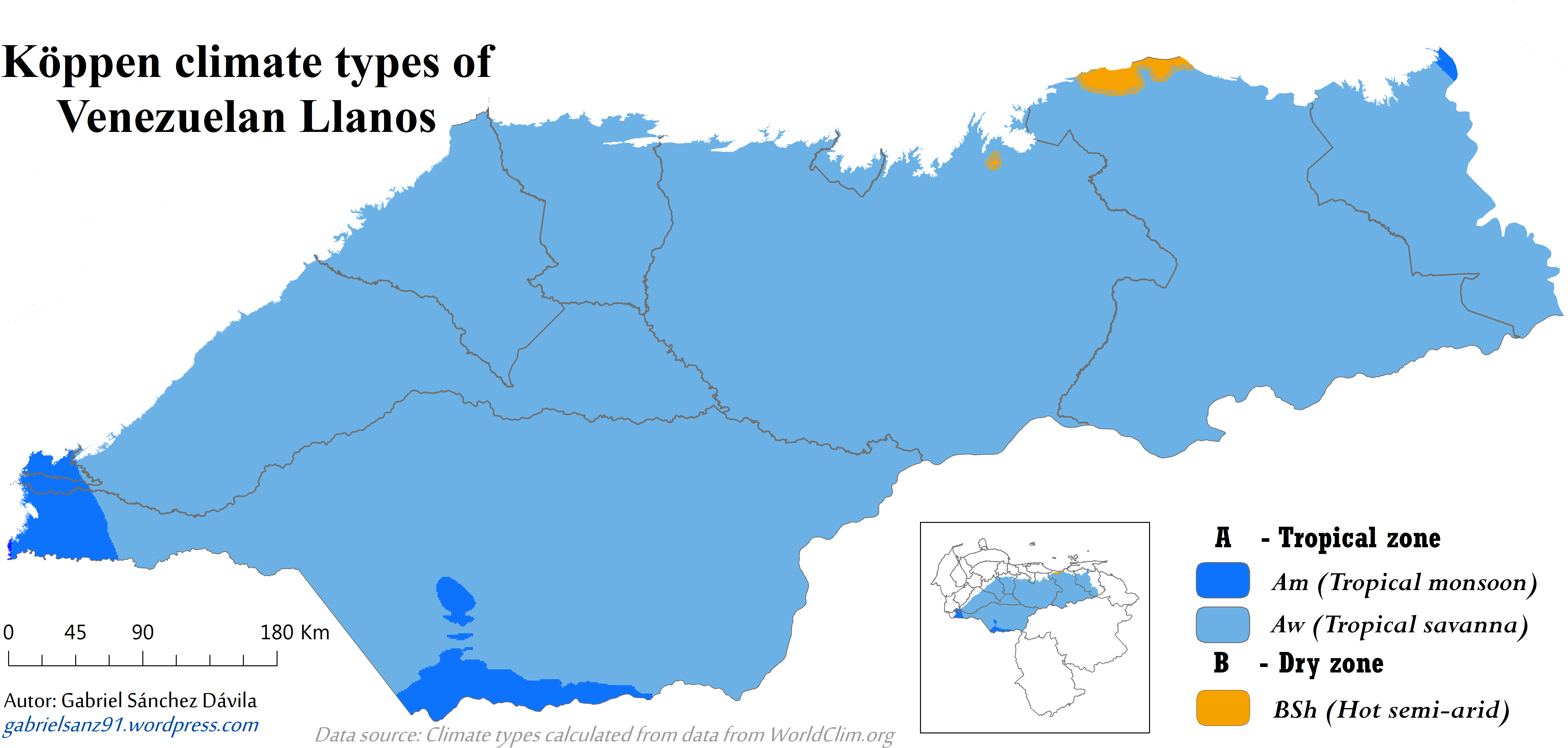
Los Llanos

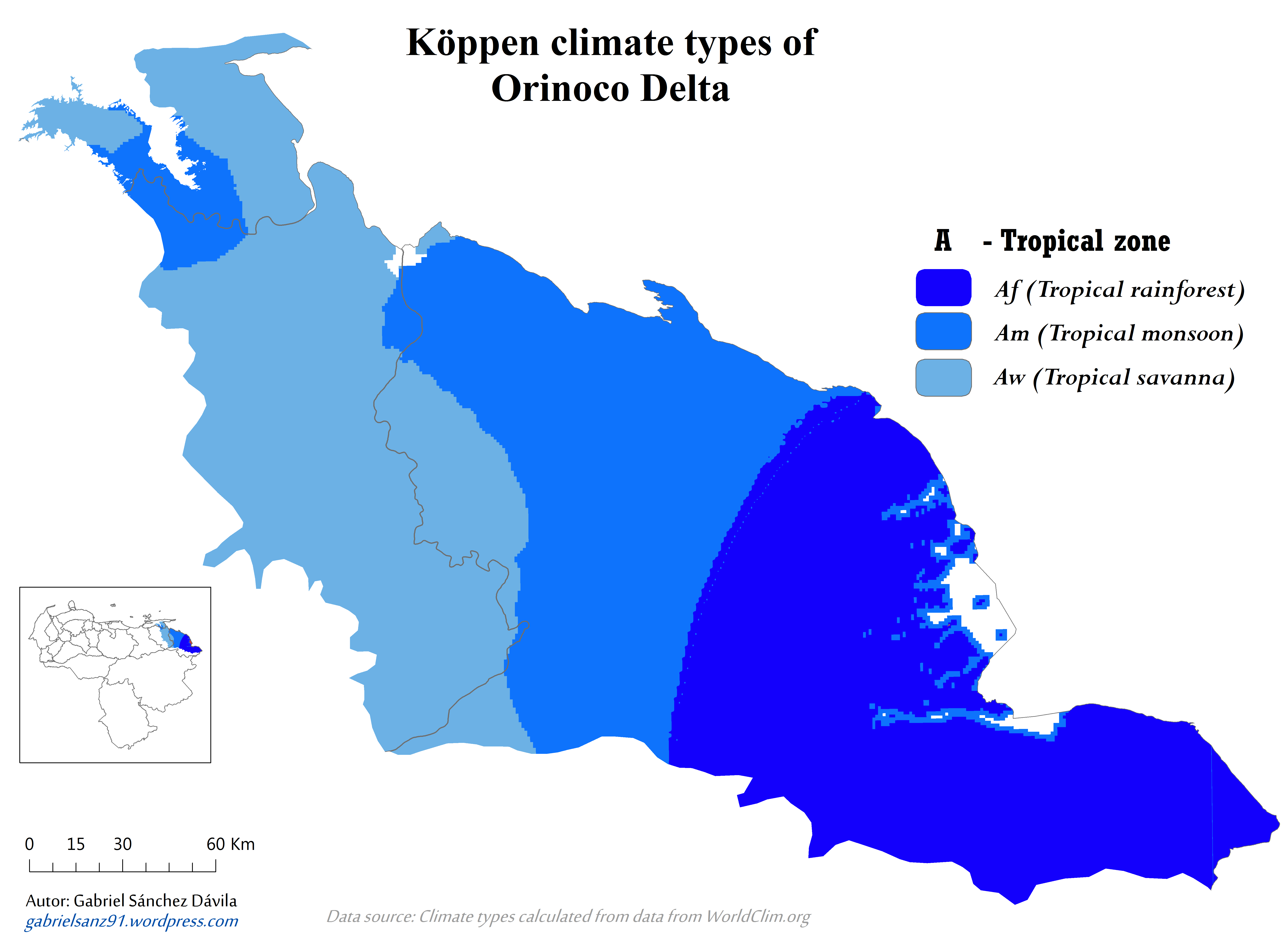
Orinoco Delta

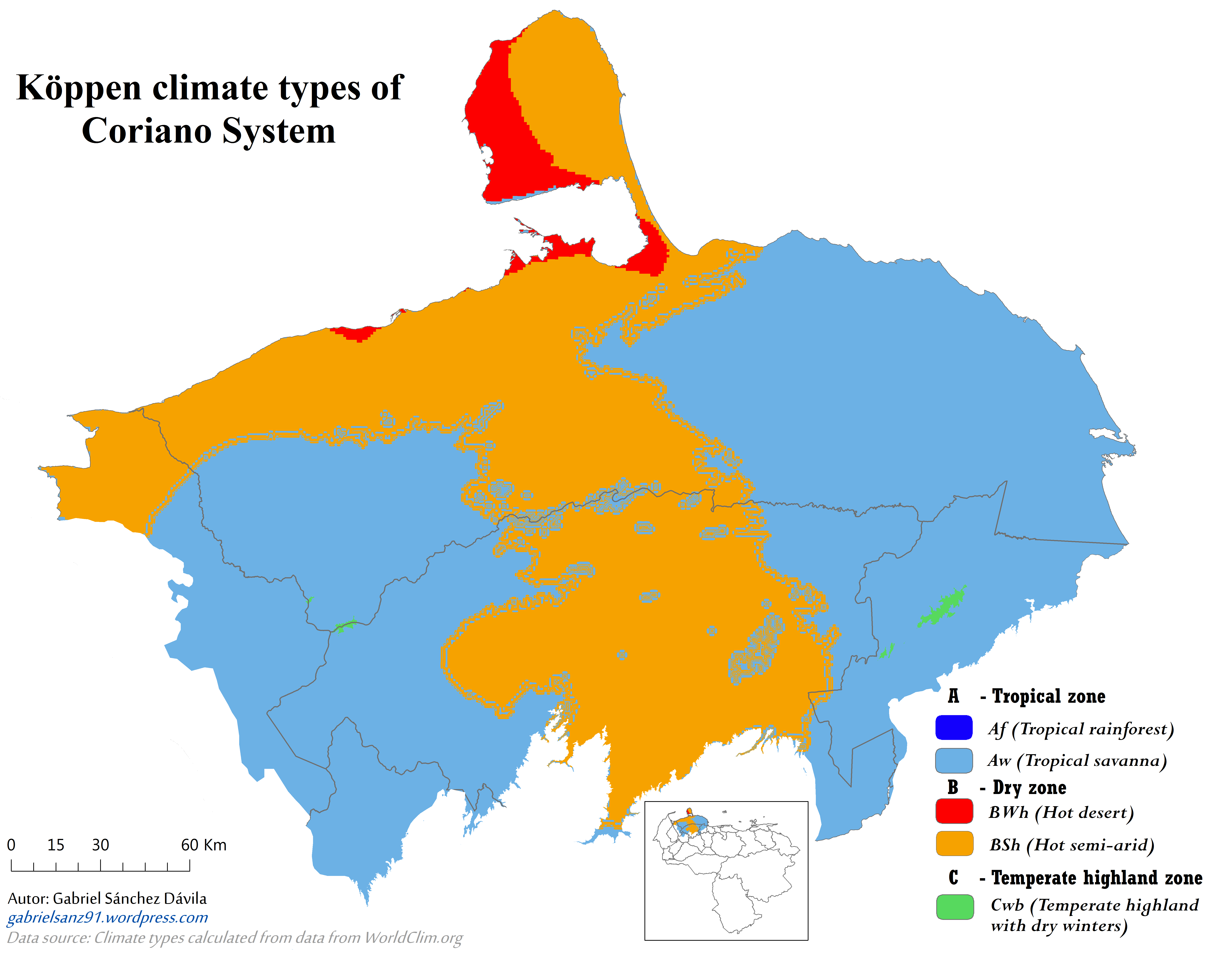
Coriano System (Lara-Falcón System)

=== Maps of climate zones by altitude ===
Climate zones by altitude across Venezuela's natural regions

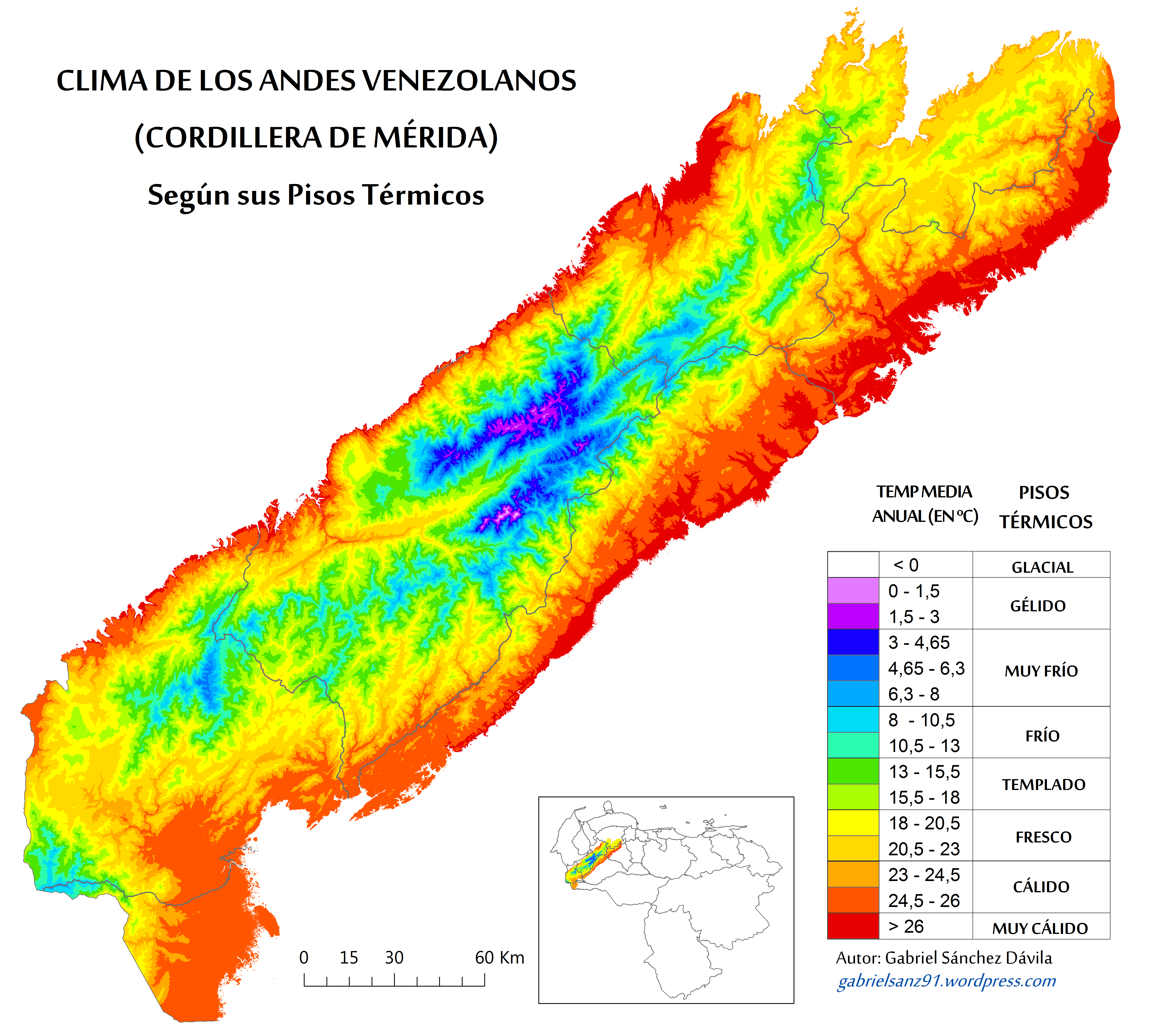
Venezuelan Andes (Mérida Cordillera)

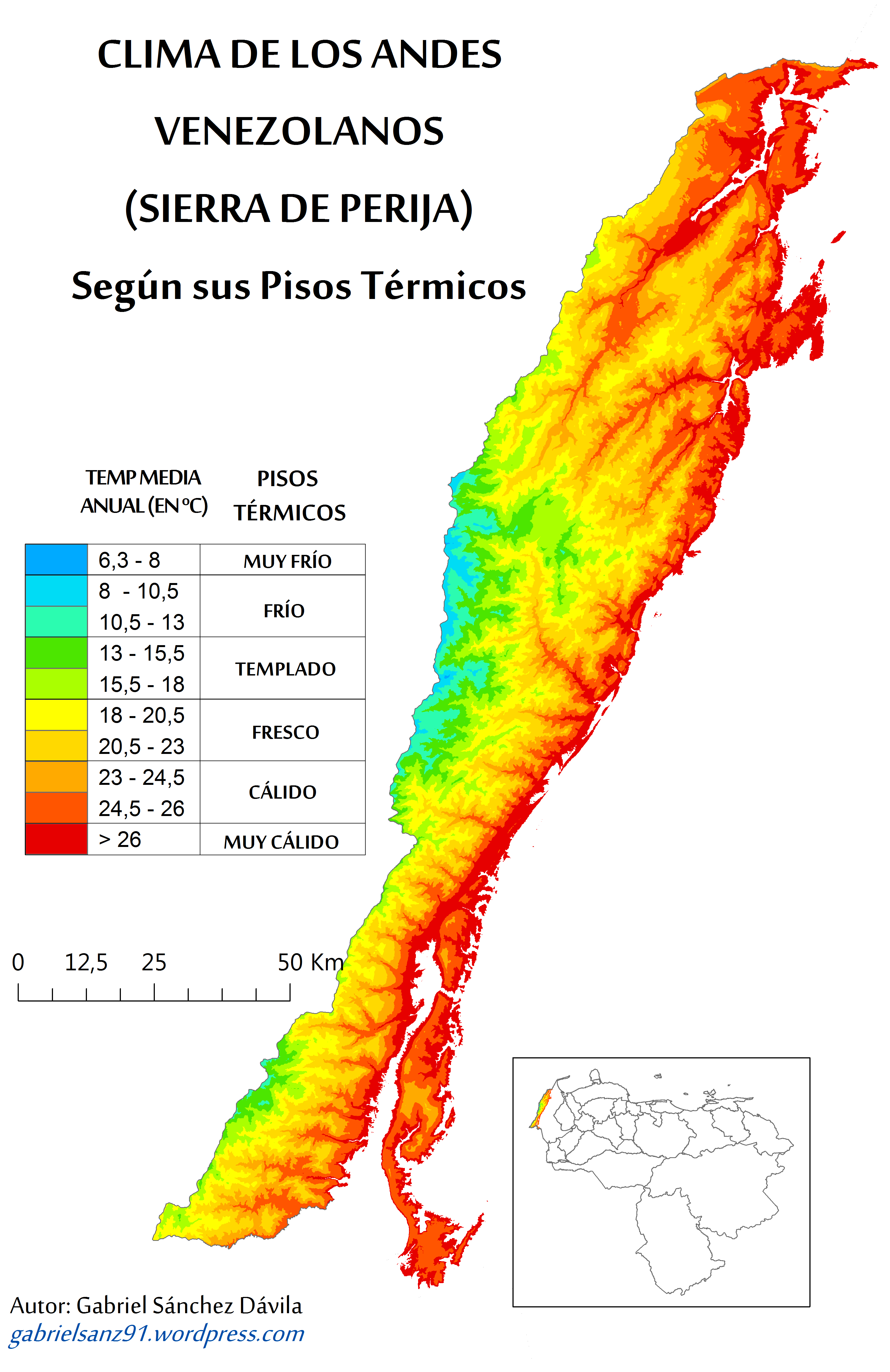
Venezuelan Andes (Sierra de Perijá)

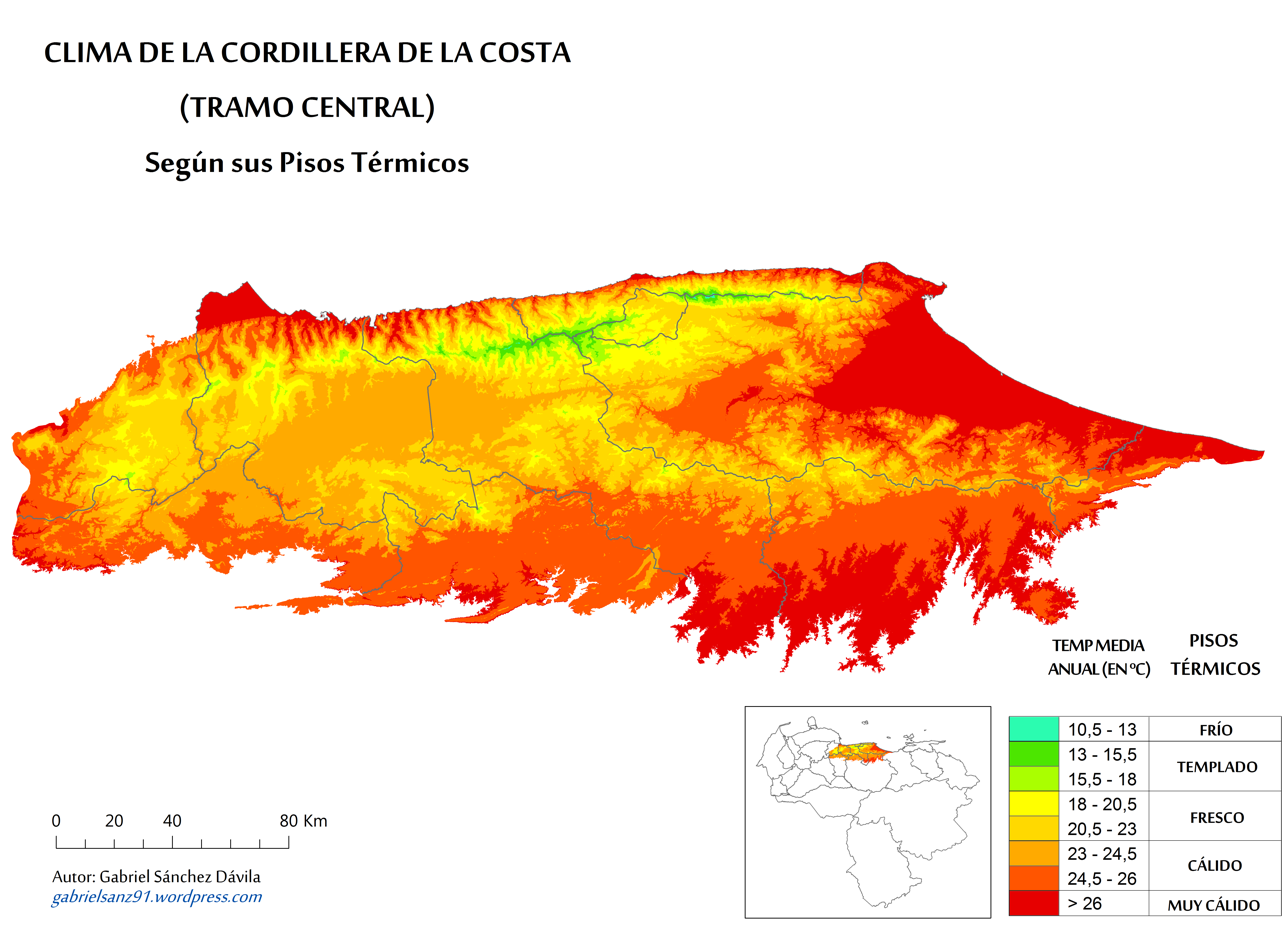
Central section (Venezuelan Coastal Range)

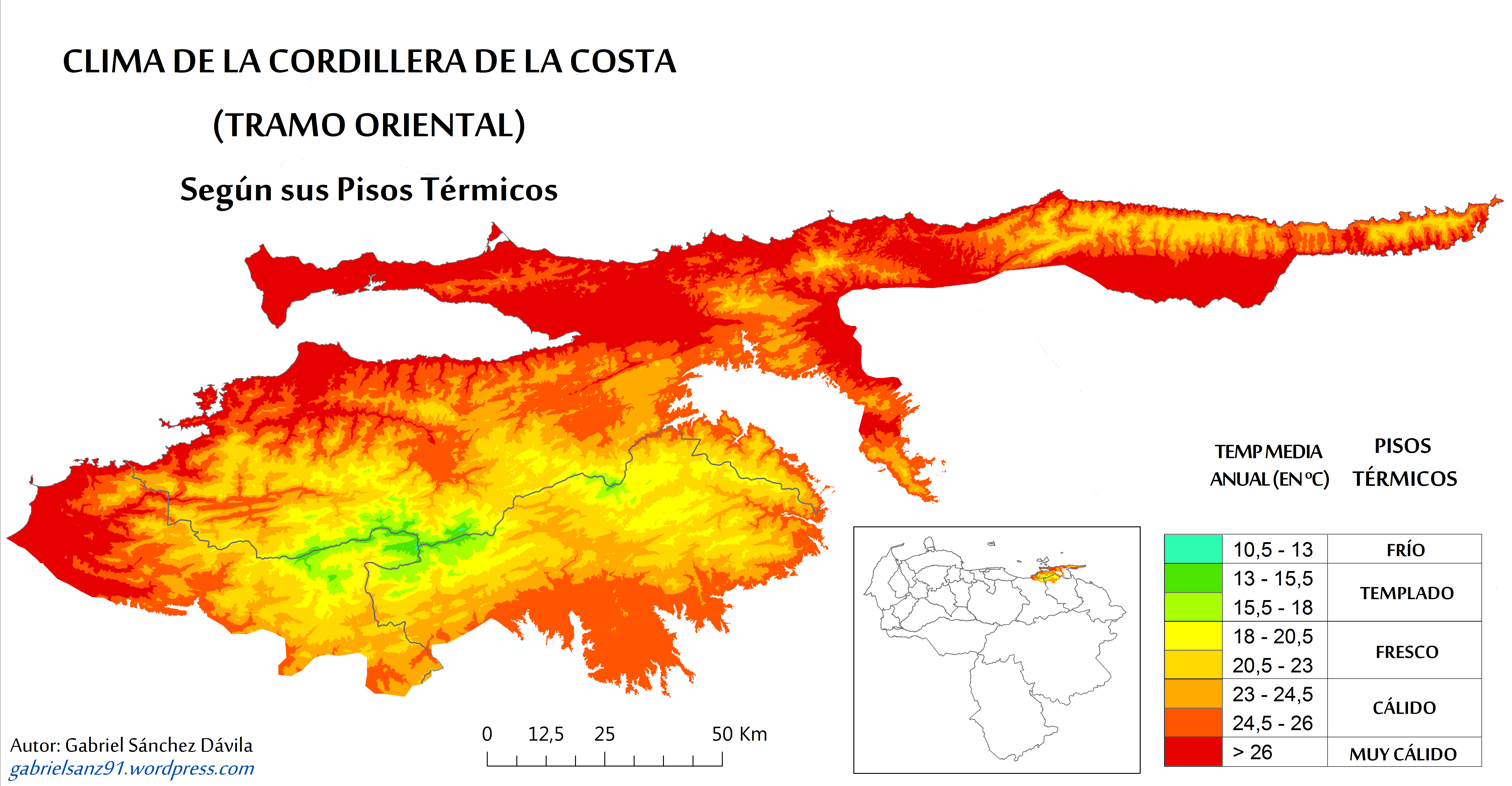
Eastern section (Venezuelan Coastal Range)

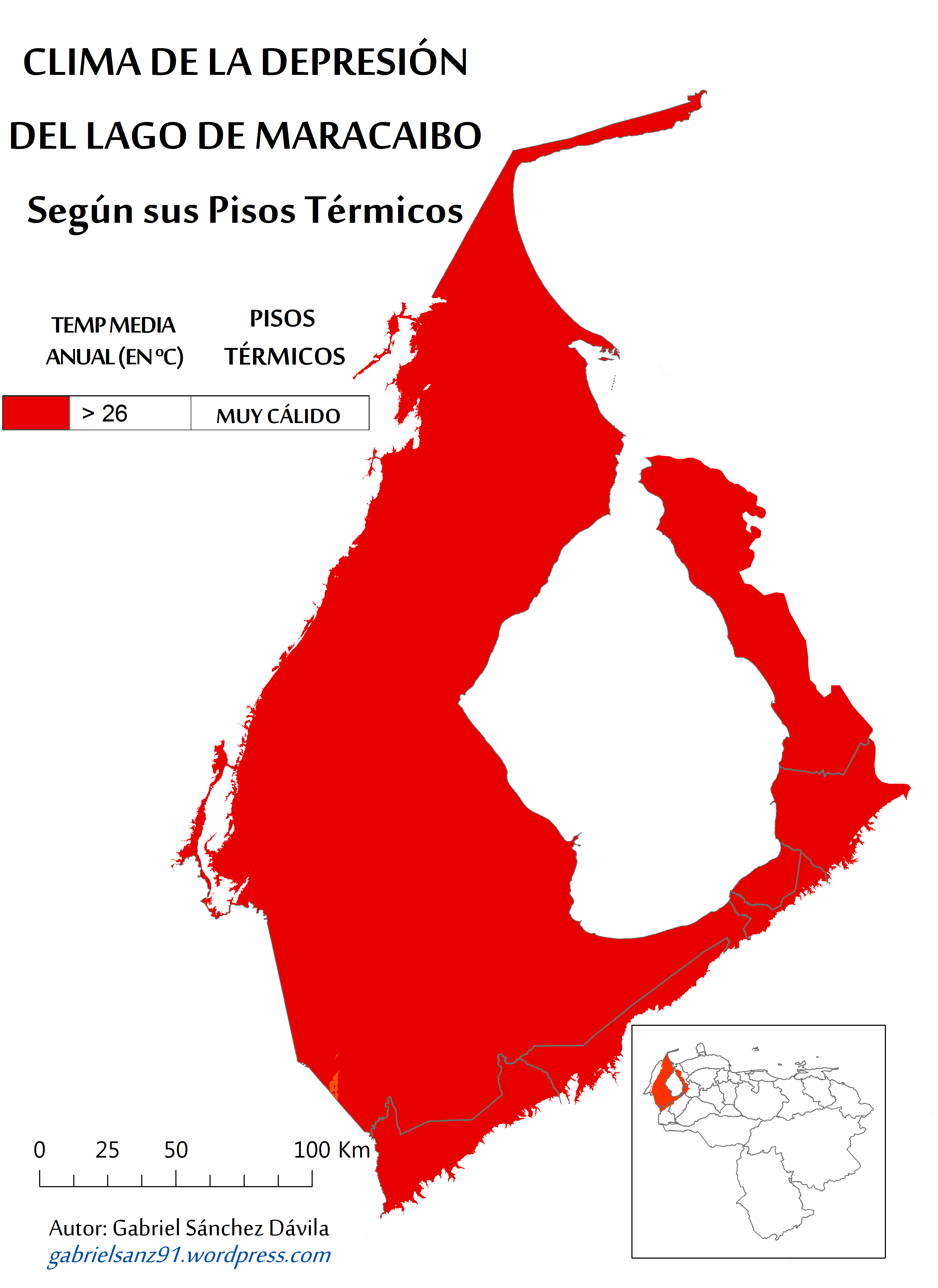
Maracaibo Lowlands

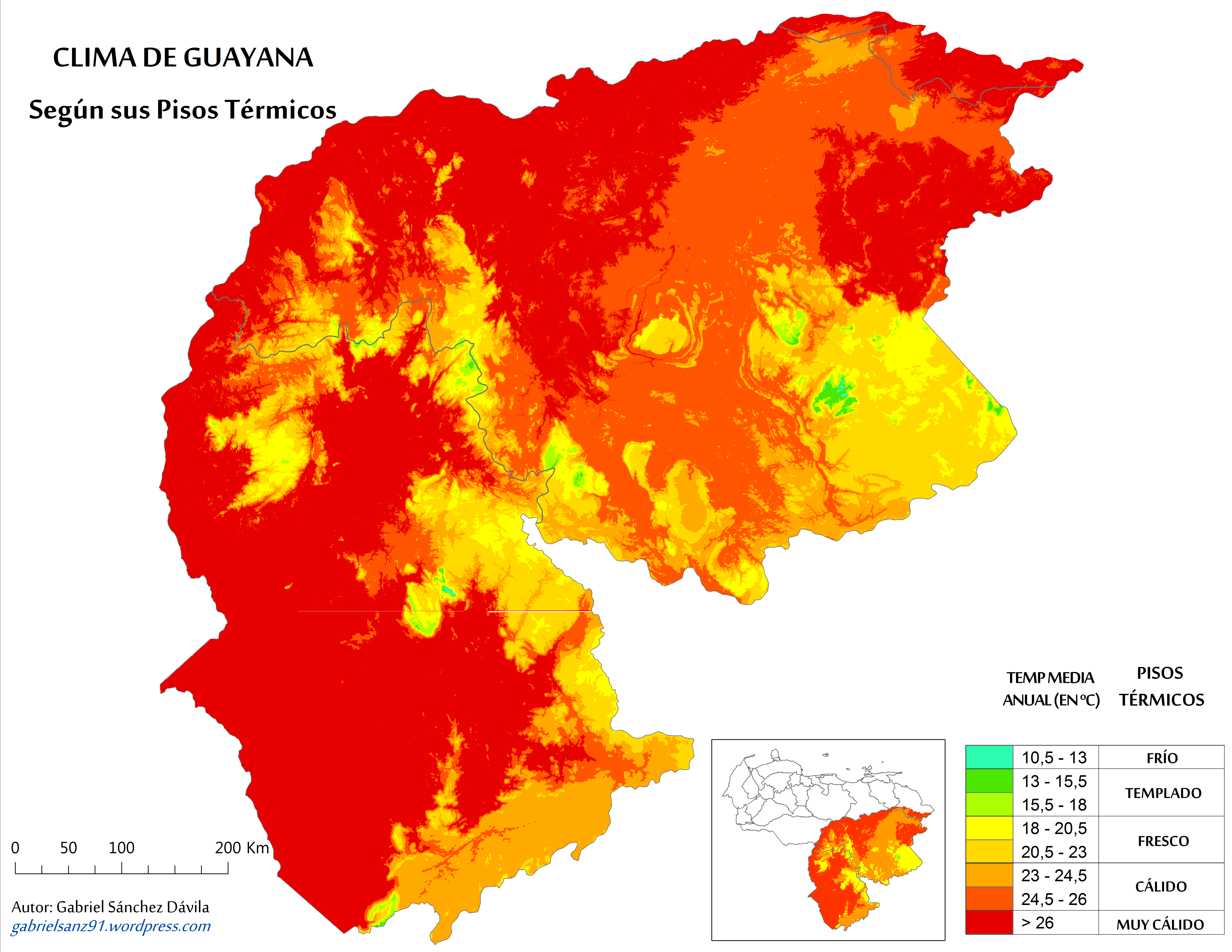
Guayana

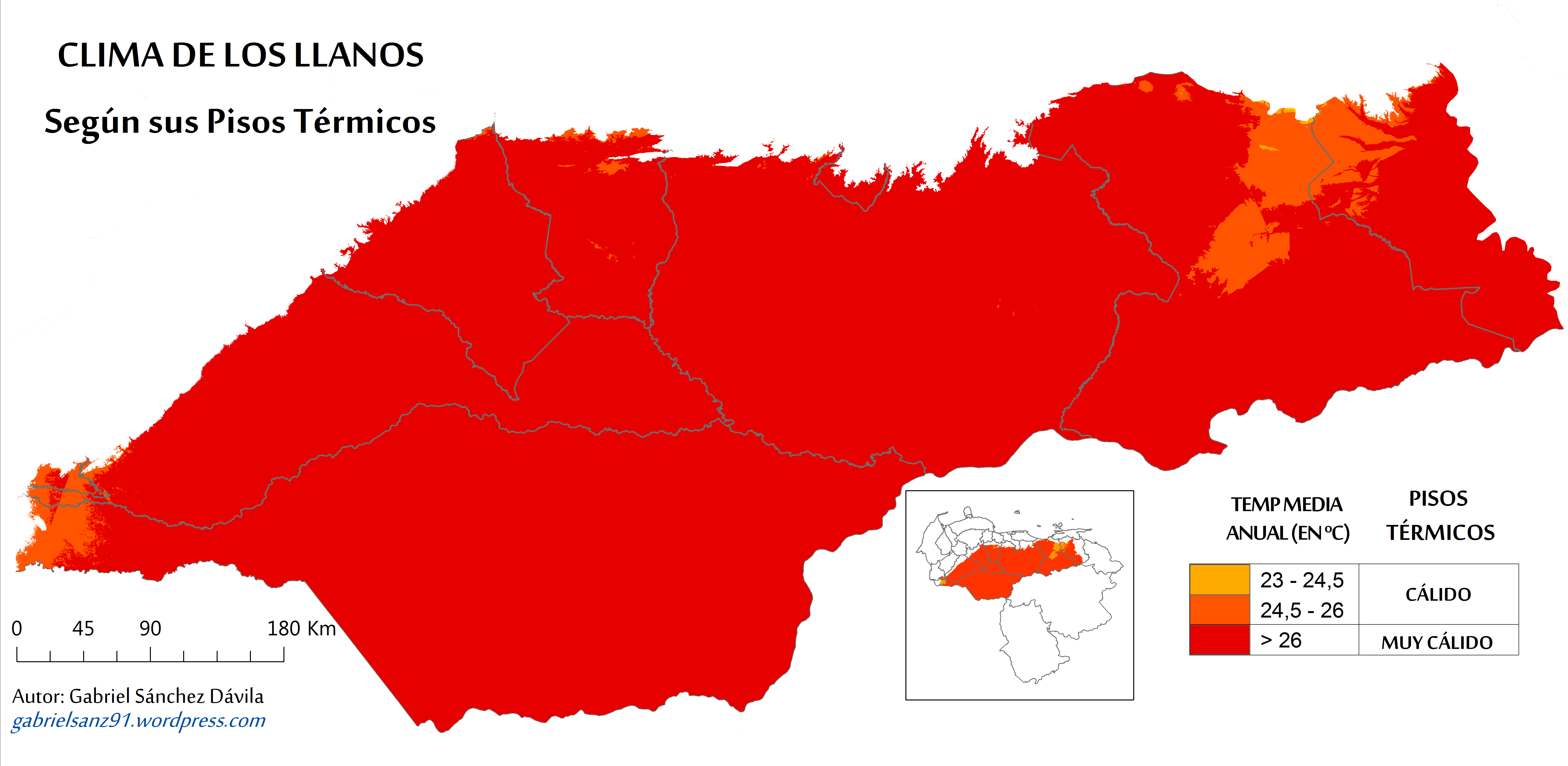
Los Llanos

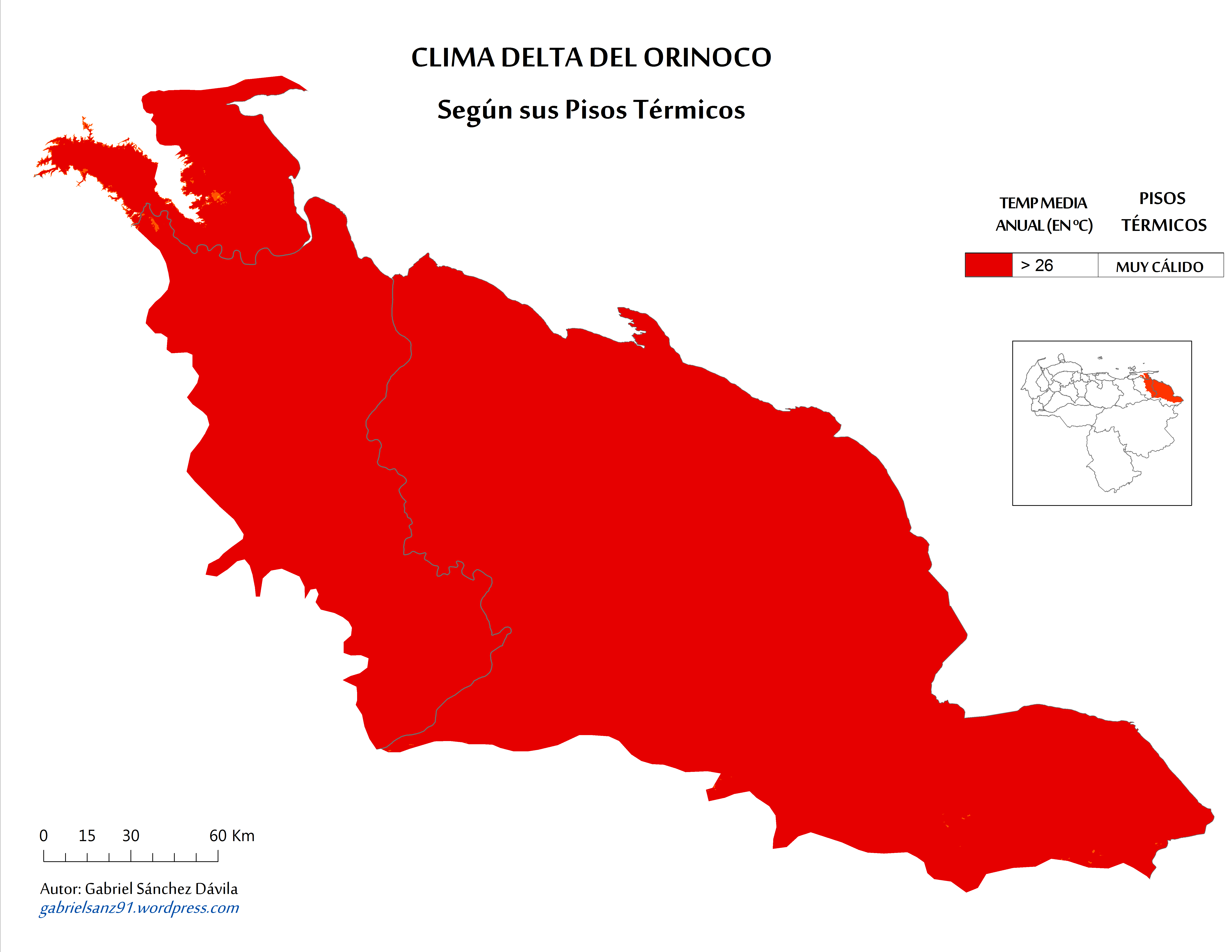
Orinoco Delta

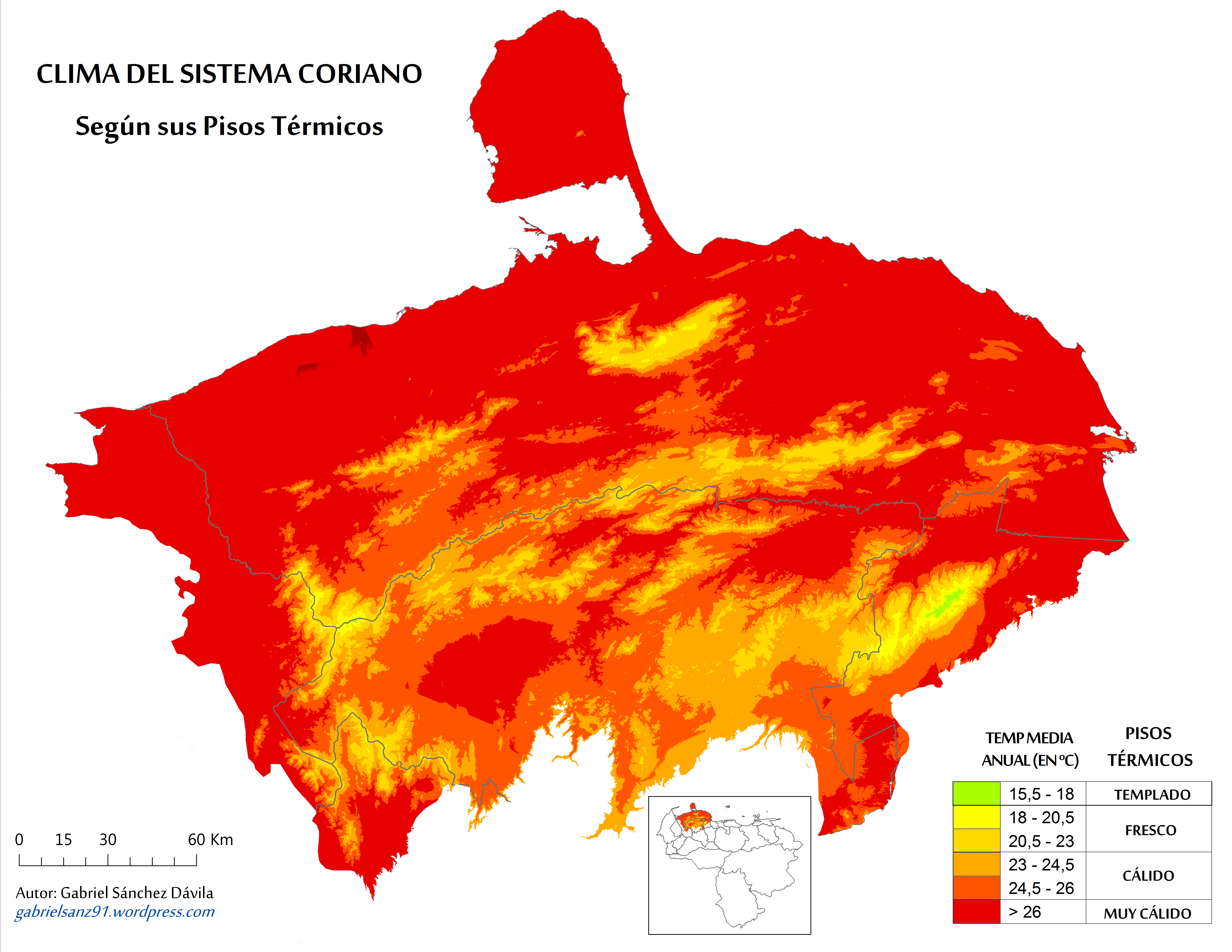
Coriano System (Lara-Falcón System)

== See also ==
- Geography of Venezuela
