= Andes =

Mountain range in South America

Andes Mountains
- Spanish: Cordillera de los Andes
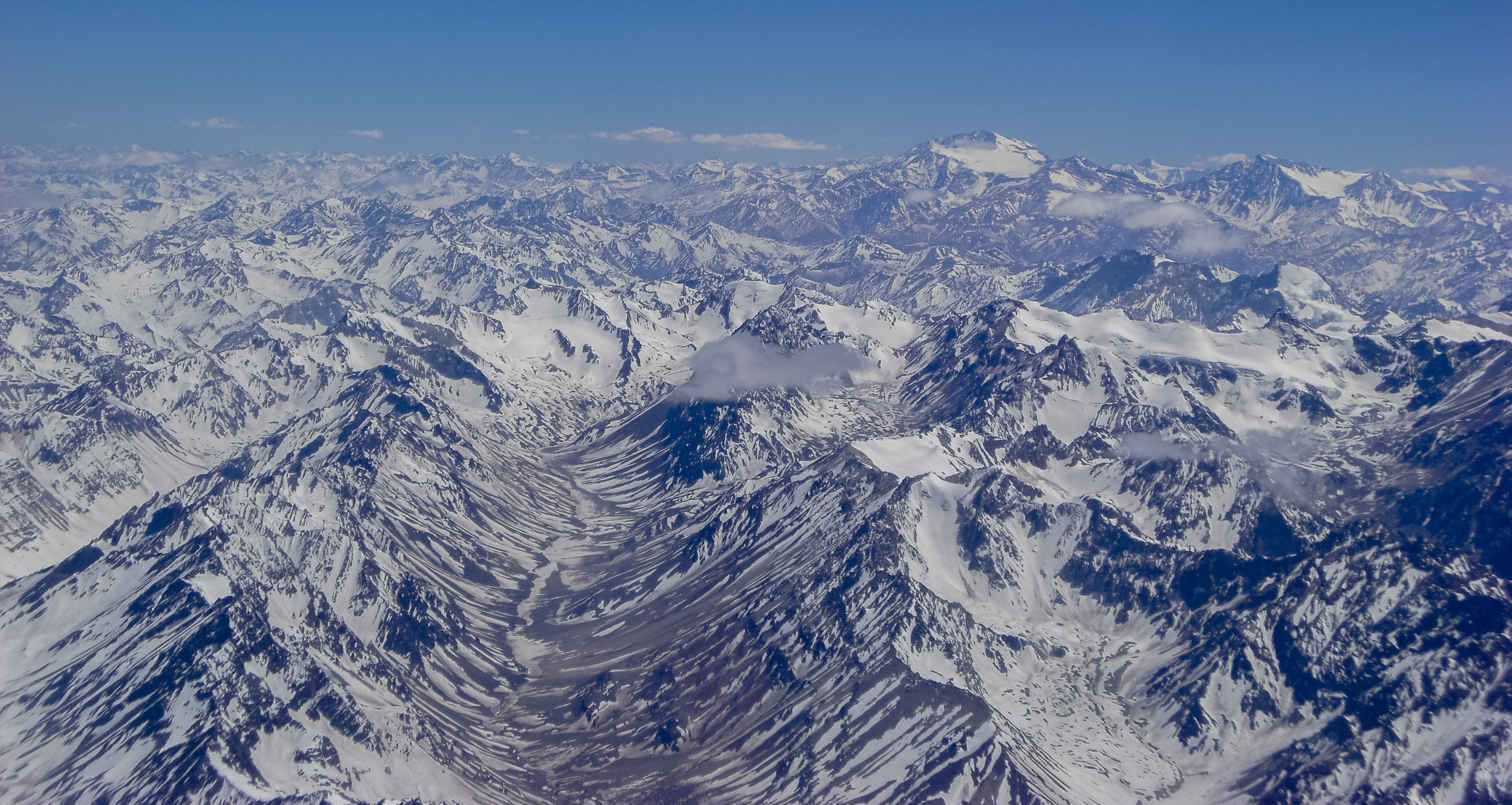
- Winter aerial view of the Andes mountain range between Mendoza (Argentina) and Santiago (Chile)

Highest point
- Peak: Aconcagua, Mendoza, Argentina
- Elevation: 6,961 m (22,838 ft)
- Coordinates: 32°39′11″S 070°0′42″W

Dimensions
- Length: 8,900 km (5,500 mi)
- Width: 330 km (210 mi)

Naming
- Native name: Anti (Quechua)

Geography
- Map of South America showing the Andes running along the entire western part (roughly parallel to the Pacific coast) of the continent
- Countries: Argentina; Bolivia; Chile; Colombia; Ecuador; Peru; Venezuela
- Range coordinates: 32°S 70°W

The Andes (/ˈændiːz/ AN-deez), Andes Mountains or Andean Mountain Range (Spanish: Cordillera de los Andes; Quechua: Anti) are the longest continental mountain range in the world, forming a continuous highland along the western edge of South America. The range is 8,900 kilometres (5,500 mi) long and 200 to 700 kilometres (120 to 430 mi) wide (widest between 18°S and 20°S latitude) and has an average height of about 4,000 metres (13,000 ft). The Andes extend from south to north through seven South American countries: Argentina, Chile, Bolivia, Peru, Ecuador, Colombia, and Venezuela.

Along their length, the Andes are split into several ranges, separated by intermediate depressions. The Andes are the location of several high plateaus—some of which host major cities such as Arequipa, Bogotá, Cali, Medellín, El Alto, La Paz, Mérida, Santiago and Sucre. The Altiplano Plateau is the world's second highest after the Tibetan Plateau. These ranges are in turn grouped into three major divisions based on climate: the Tropical Andes, the Dry Andes, and the Wet Andes.

The Andes are the highest mountain range outside of Asia. The range's highest peak, Argentina's Aconcagua, rises to an elevation of about 6,961 metres (22,838 ft) above sea level. The peak of Chimborazo in the Ecuadorian Andes is farther from the Earth's center than any other location on the Earth's surface, due to the equatorial bulge resulting from the Earth's rotation. The world's highest volcanoes are in the Andes, including Ojos del Salado on the Chile–Argentina border, which rises to 6,893 metres (22,615 ft).

The Andes are also part of the American Cordillera, a chain of mountain ranges (cordillera) that consist of an almost continuous sequence of mountain ranges that form the western "backbone" of the Americas and Antarctica.

== Etymology ==
The etymology of the word Andes has been debated. The majority consensus is that it derives from the Quechua word anti "east" as in Antisuyu (Quechua for "east region"), one of the four regions of the Inca Empire. Others suggest that it is from the word anta (meaning copper) of the older Aymara language.

The term cordillera comes from the Spanish word cordel "rope" and is used as a descriptive name for several contiguous sections of the Andes, as well as the entire Andean range, and the combined mountain chain along the western part of the North and South American continents.

== Geography ==
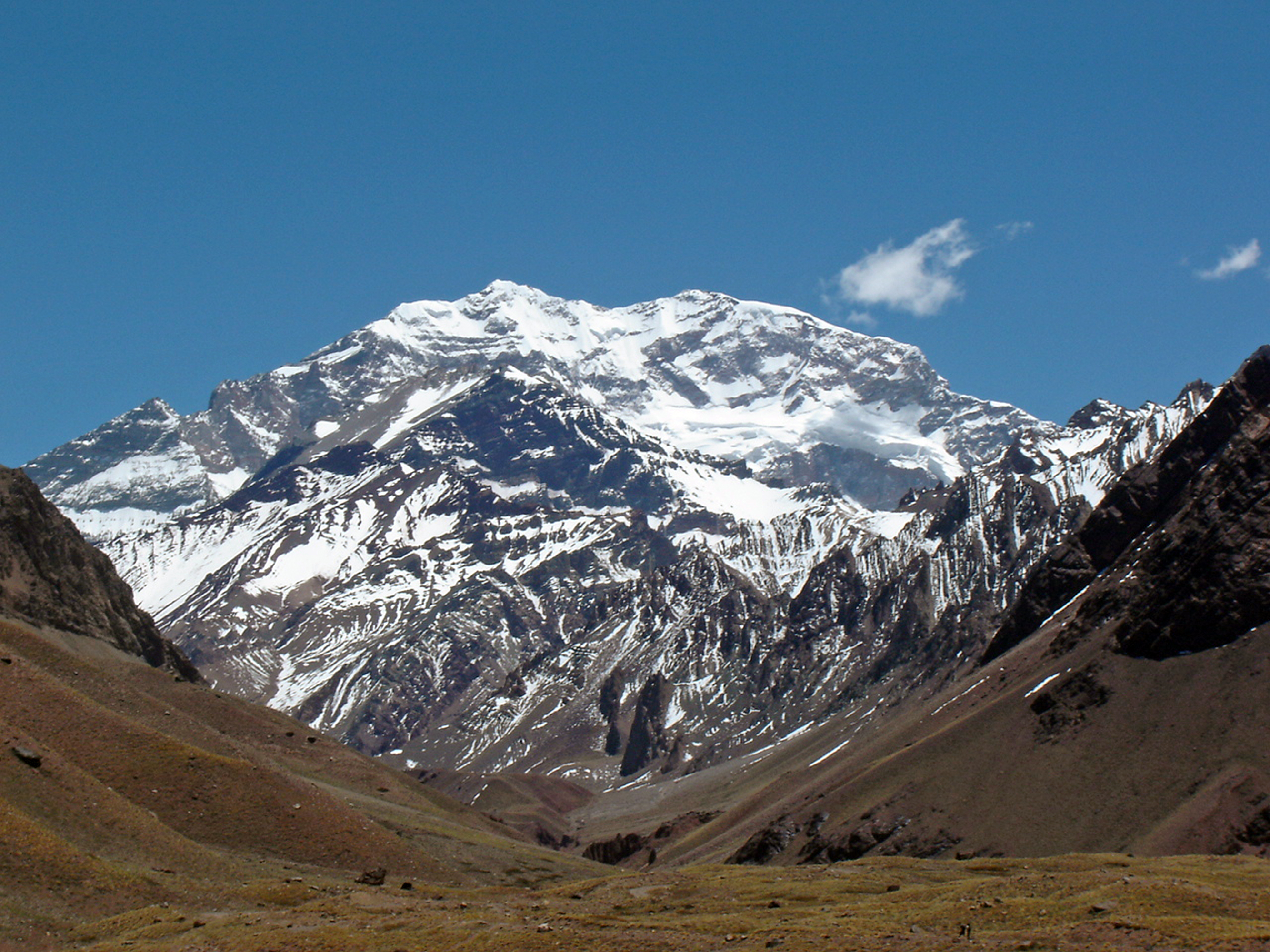
Aconcagua, in Argentina, the highest mountain in the Western Hemisphere and in the world outside the Himalayan system.

The Andes mountain range, the longest continental mountain system in the world, extends approximately 7,000 km (4,300 mi) along the western edge of South America, spanning seven countries. Its width varies from 200 km (120 mi) to 700 km (430 mi), encompassing a series of parallel cordilleras, high plateaus, and deep intermontane valleys. Prominent peaks such as Aconcagua at 6,961 metres (22,838 feet) in Argentina, Huascarán at 6,768 metres (22,205 feet) in Peru, and Illimani 6,438 metres (21,122 feet) in Bolivia illustrate the extreme elevations and rugged relief that define the range. The Andes encompass a wide variety of climatic and ecological zones, ranging from humid cloud forests on the eastern slopes to the arid high plains of the Altiplano and the glaciated summits of the southern Andes. These sharp environmental gradients have strongly influenced human settlement and the development of major highland cities such as Bogotá, Cusco, La Paz and Quito.

The Andes can be divided into three sections:

- The Southern Andes in Argentina and Chile, south of Llullaillaco;
- The Central Andes in Bolivia and Peru; and
- The Northern Andes in Colombia, Ecuador, and Venezuela. The northern Andes are separated into three branches.

At the northern end of the Andes, the separate Sierra Nevada de Santa Marta range is often, but not always, treated as part of the Northern Andes.

The Leeward Antilles islands Aruba, Bonaire, and Curaçao, which lie in the Caribbean Sea off the coast of Venezuela, were formerly thought to represent the submerged peaks of the extreme northern edge of the Andes range, but ongoing geological studies indicate that such a simplification does not do justice to the complex tectonic boundary between the South American and Caribbean plates.

== Geology ==
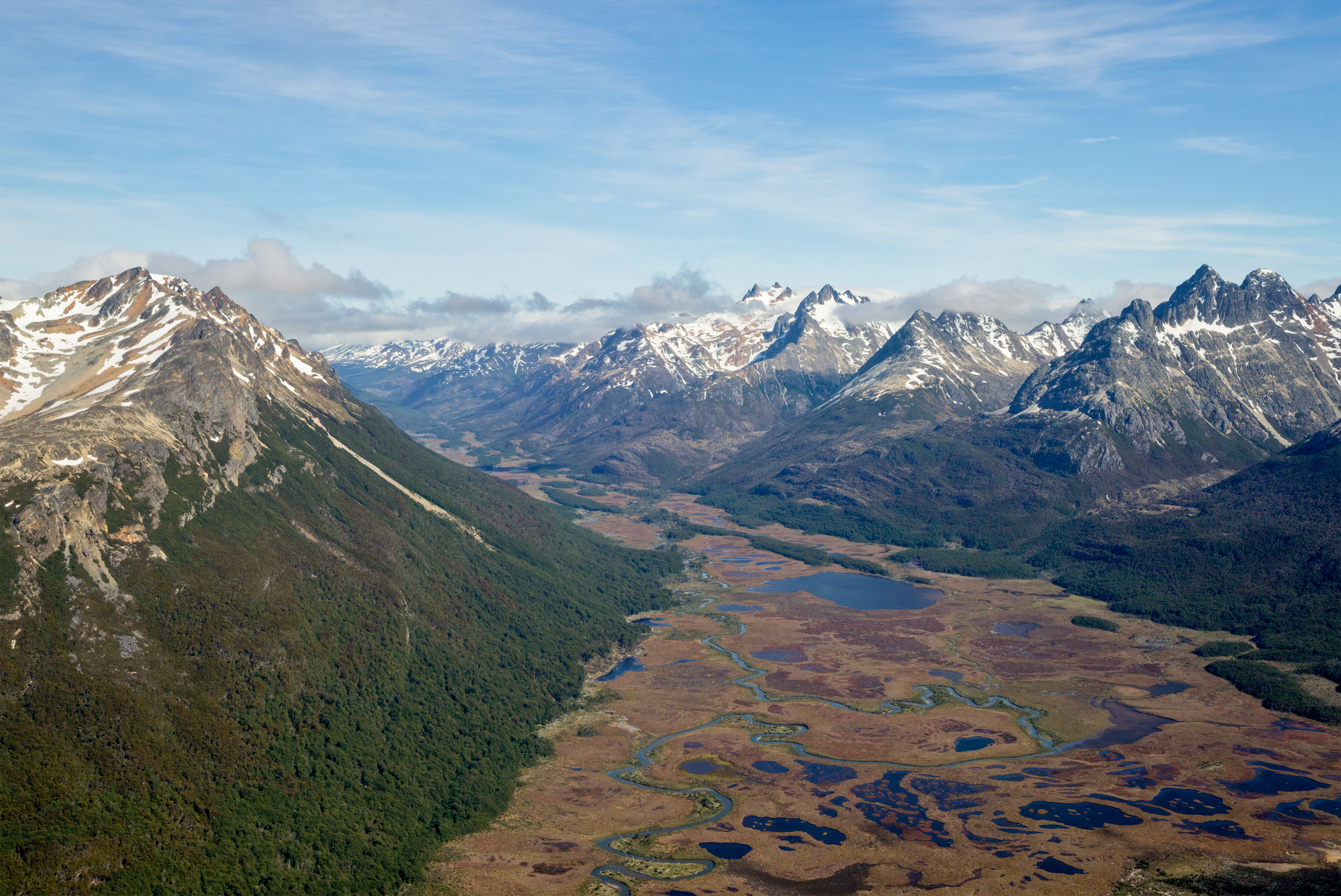
Aerial view of Valle Carbajal in the Tierra del Fuego. The Andes range is about 200 km (124 mi) wide throughout its length, except in the Bolivian flexure where it is about 640 kilometres (398 mi) wide.

The Andes are an orogenic belt of mountains along the Pacific Ring of Fire, a zone of volcanic activity that encompasses the Pacific rim of the Americas as well as the Asia-Pacific region. The Andes are the result of tectonic plate processes extending during the Mesozoic and Tertiary eras, caused by the subduction of oceanic crust beneath the South American Plate as the Nazca Plate and South American Plate converge. These processes were accelerated by the effects of climate. As the uplift of the Andes created a rain shadow on the western fringes of Chile, ocean currents and prevailing winds carried moisture away from the Chilean coast. This caused some areas of the subduction zone to be sediment-starved, which in turn prevented the subducting plate from having a well lubricated surface. These factors increased the rate of contractional coastal uplift in the Andes. The main cause of the rise of the Andes is the contraction of the western rim of the South American Plate due to the subduction of the Nazca Plate and the Antarctic Plate. To the east, the Andes range is bounded by several sedimentary basins, such as the Orinoco Basin, the Amazon Basin, the Madre de Dios Basin, and the Gran Chaco, that separate the Andes from the ancient cratons in eastern South America. In the south, the Andes share a long boundary with the former Patagonia Terrane. To the west, the Andes end at the Pacific Ocean, although the Peru–Chile Trench can be considered their ultimate western limit.

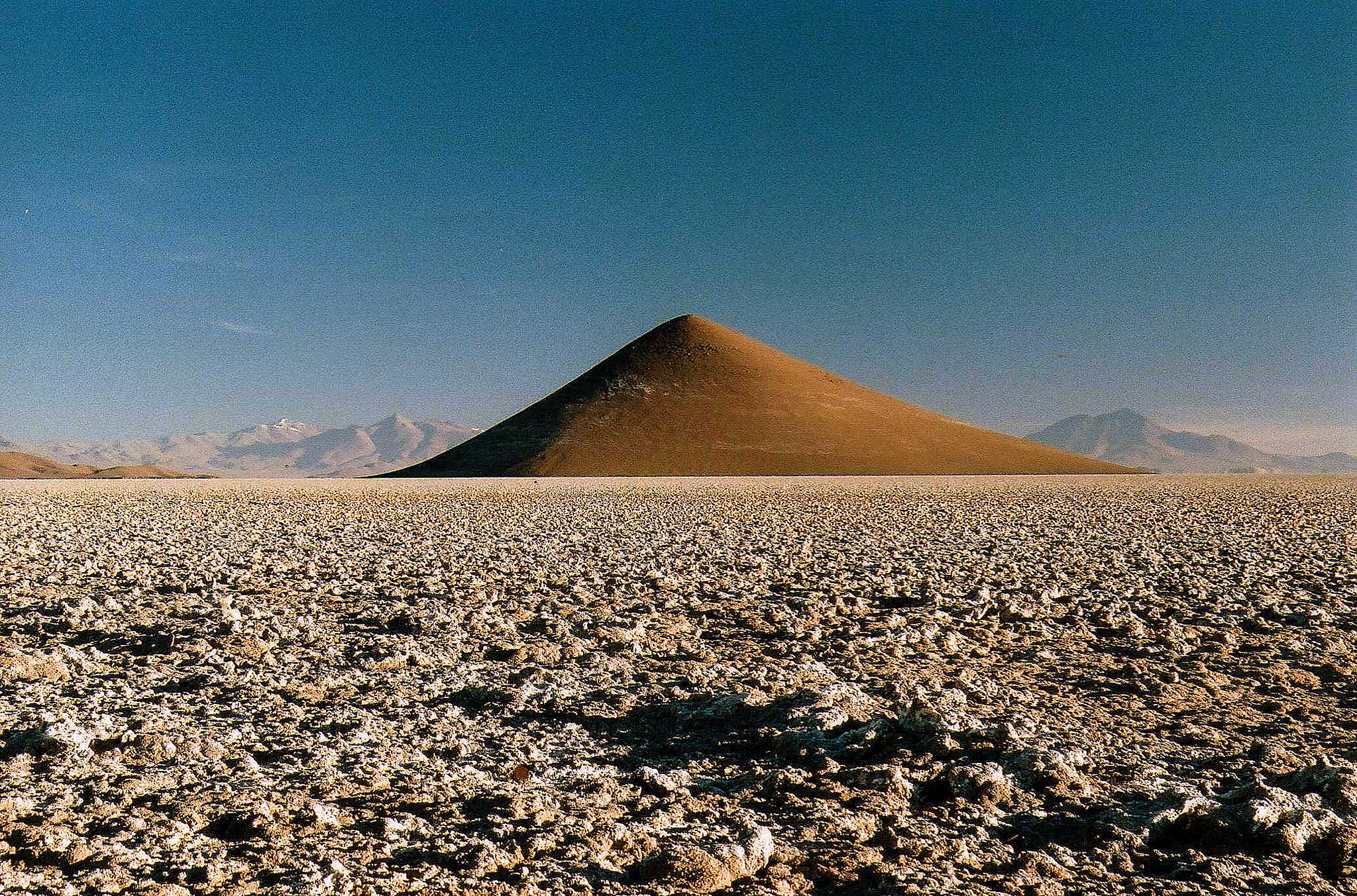
"Cono de Arita" in the Puna de Atacama, Salta (Argentina)

The Andean orogen has a series of bends or oroclines. The Bolivian Orocline is a seaward-concave bending in the coast of South America and the Andes Mountains at about 18° S. At this point, the orientation of the Andes turns from northwest in Peru to south in Chile and Argentina. The Andean segments north and south of the Orocline have been rotated 15° counter-clockwise to 20° clockwise respectively. The Bolivian Orocline area overlaps with the area of the maximum width of the Altiplano Plateau, and according to Isacks (1988) the Orocline is related to crustal shortening. The specific point at 18° S where the coastline bends is known as the Arica Elbow. Further south lies the Maipo Orocline, a more subtle orocline between 30° S and 38°S with a seaward-concave break in the trend at 33° S. Near the southern tip of the Andes lies the Patagonian Orocline.

=== Orogeny ===
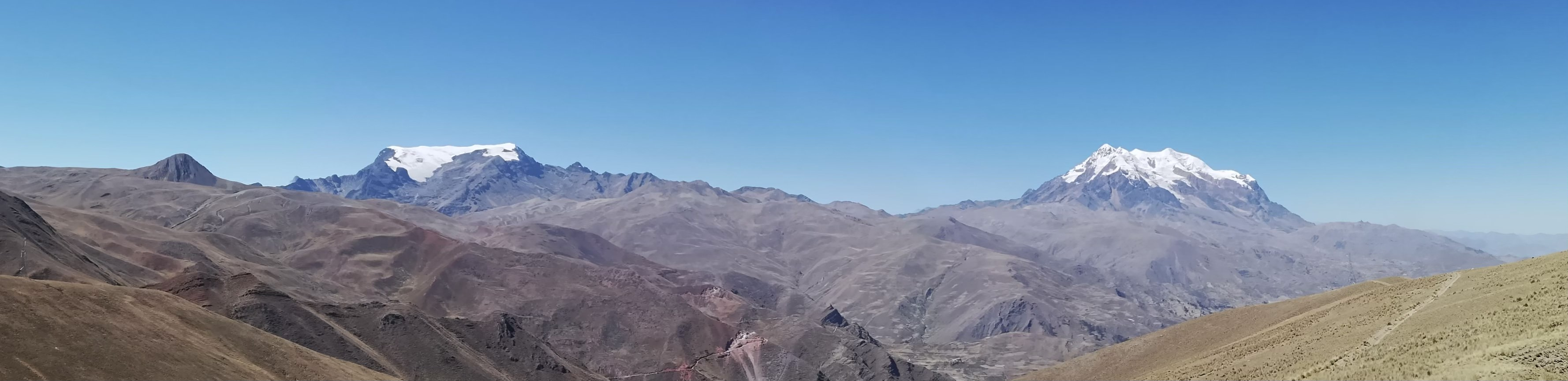
Mururata and Illimani in Bolivia, two prominent peaks formed by the tectonic uplift caused by the Andean orogeny and plate subduction.

The western rim of the South American Plate has been the place of several pre-Andean orogenies since at least the late Proterozoic and early Paleozoic, when several terranes and microcontinents collided and amalgamated with the ancient cratons of eastern South America, by then the South American part of Gondwana.

The formation of the modern Andes began with the events of the Triassic, when Pangaea began the breakup that resulted in developing several rifts. The development continued through the Jurassic Period. It was during the Cretaceous Period that the Andes began to take their present form, by the uplifting, faulting, and folding of sedimentary and metamorphic rocks of the ancient cratons to the east. The rise of the Andes has not been constant, as different regions have had different degrees of tectonic stress, uplift, and erosion.

Across the 1,000-kilometer-wide (620 mi) Drake Passage lie the mountains of the Antarctic Peninsula south of the Scotia Plate, which appear to be a continuation of the Andes chain.

The far east regions of the Andes experience a series of changes resulting from the Andean orogeny. Parts of the Sunsás Orogen in the Amazonian craton disappeared from the surface of the earth, being overridden by the Andes. The Sierras de Córdoba, where the effects of the ancient Pampean orogeny can be observed, owe their modern uplift and relief to the Andean orogeny in the Tertiary. Further south in southern Patagonia, the onset of the Andean orogeny caused the Magallanes Basin to evolve from being an extensional back-arc basin in the Mesozoic to being a contractional foreland basin in the Cenozoic.

=== Seismic activity ===
Tectonic forces above the subduction zone along the entire west coast of South America where the Nazca Plate and a part of the Antarctic Plate are sliding beneath the South American Plate continue to produce an ongoing orogenic event resulting in minor to major earthquakes and volcanic eruptions to this day. Many high-magnitude earthquakes have been recorded in the region, such as the 2010 Maule earthquake (M8.8), the 2015 Illapel earthquake (M8.2), and the 1960 Valdivia earthquake (M9.5), which as of 2024 was the strongest ever recorded on seismometers.

The amount, magnitude, and type of seismic activity varies greatly along the subduction zone. These differences are due to a wide range of factors, including friction between the plates, angle of subduction, buoyancy of the subducting plate, rate of subduction, and hydration value of the mantle material. The highest rate of seismic activity is observed in the central portion of the boundary, between 33°S and 35°S. In this area, the angle of subduction is very low, meaning the subducting plate is nearly horizontal. Studies of mantle hydration across the subduction zone have shown a correlation between increased material hydration and lower-magnitude, more frequent seismic activity. Zones exhibiting dehydration instead are thought to have a higher potential for larger, high-magnitude earthquakes in the future.

The mountain range is also a source of shallow intraplate earthquakes within the South American Plate. The largest such earthquake (as of 2024) struck Peru in 1947 and measured M_{s} 7.5. In the Peruvian Andes, these earthquakes display normal (1946), strike-slip (1976), and reverse (1969, 1983) mechanisms. The Amazonian Craton is actively underthrusted beneath the sub-Andes region of Peru, producing thrust faults. In Colombia, Ecuador, and Peru, thrust faulting occurs along the sub-Andes due in response to contraction brought on by subduction, while in the high Andes, normal faulting occurs in response to gravitational forces.

In the extreme south, a major transform fault separates Tierra del Fuego from the small Scotia Plate.

=== Volcanism ===
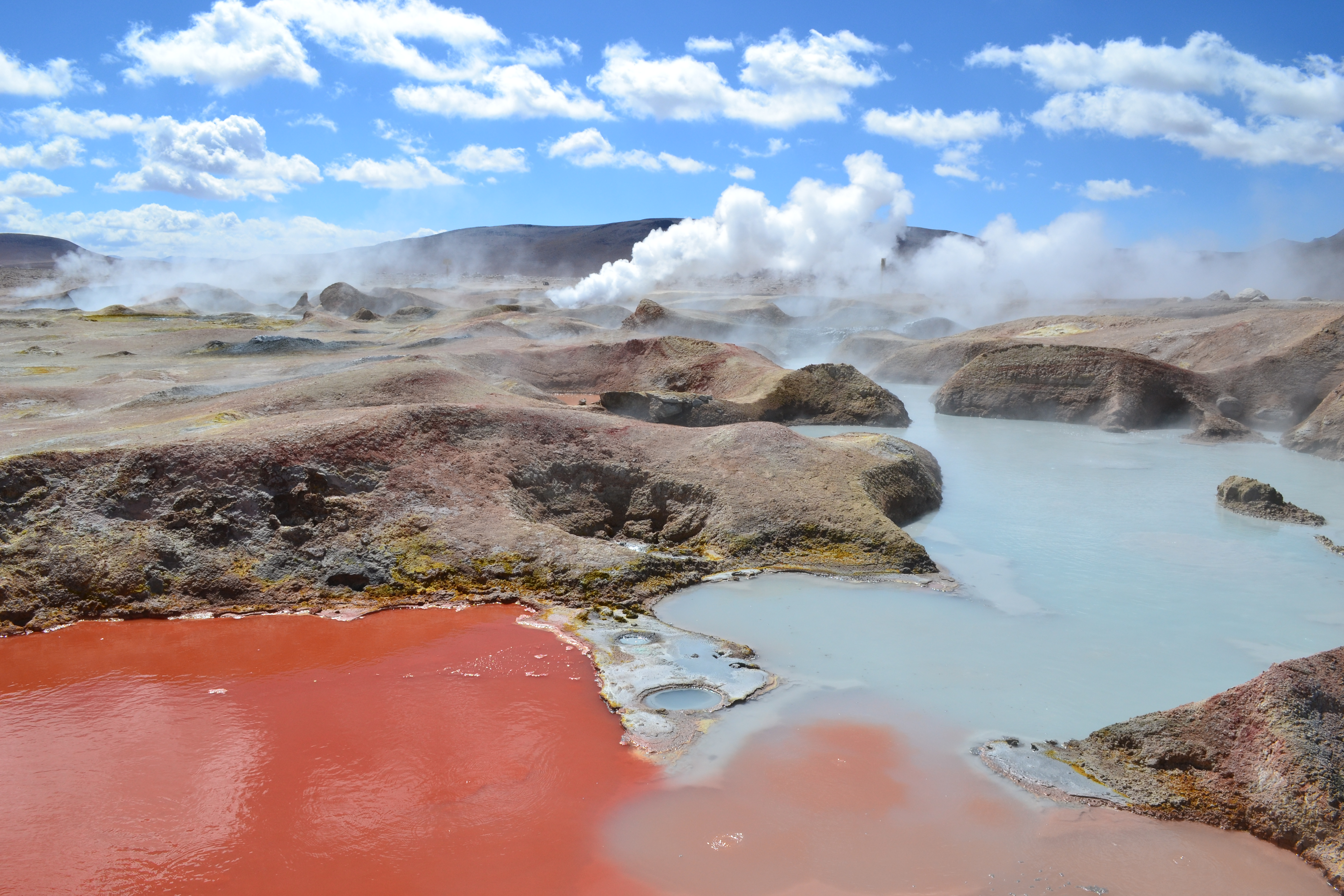
Sol de Mañana, an area of intense geothermal activity with fumaroles and geysers, Bolivia

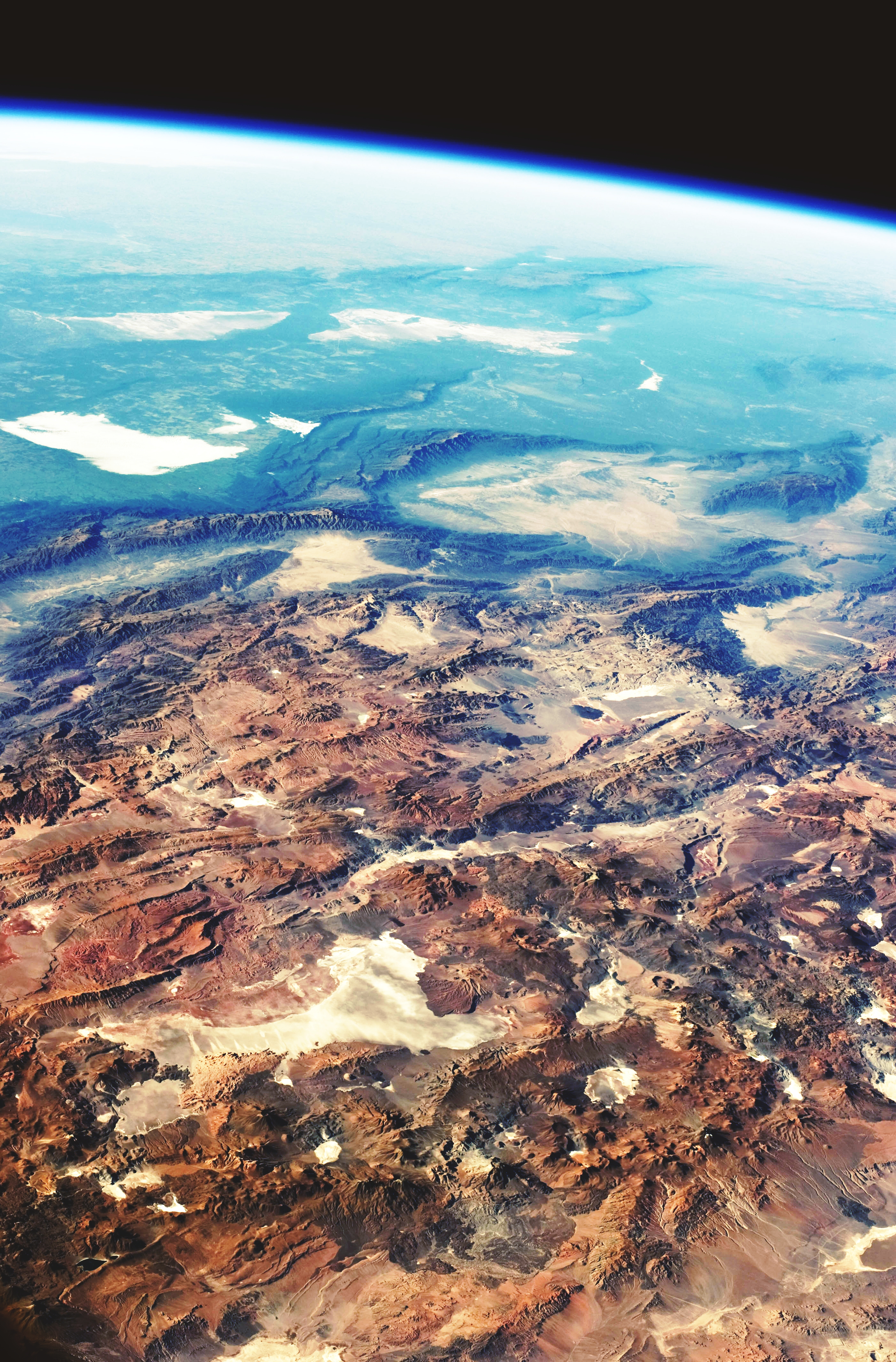
This photo from the ISS shows the high plains of the Andes Mountains in the foreground, with a line of young volcanoes facing the much lower Atacama Desert

The Andes range has many active volcanoes distributed in four volcanic zones separated by areas of inactivity. The Andean volcanism is a result of the subduction of the Nazca Plate and Antarctic Plate underneath the South American Plate. The belt is subdivided into four main volcanic zones that are separated from each other by volcanic gaps. The volcanoes of the belt are diverse in terms of activity style, products, and morphology. Although some differences can be explained by which volcanic zone a volcano belongs to, there are significant differences inside volcanic zones and even between neighboring volcanoes. Despite being a typical location for calc-alkalic and subduction volcanism, the Andean Volcanic Belt has a large range of volcano-tectonic settings, such as rift systems, extensional zones, transpressional faults, subduction of mid-ocean ridges, and seamount chains apart from a large range of crustal thicknesses and magma ascent paths, and different amount of crustal assimilations.

=== Ore deposits and evaporites ===
The Andes Mountains host large ore and salt deposits, and some of their eastern fold and thrust belts act as traps for commercially exploitable amounts of hydrocarbons. In the forelands of the Atacama Desert, some of the largest porphyry copper mineralizations occur, making Chile and Peru the first- and second-largest exporters of copper in the world. Porphyry copper in the western slopes of the Andes has been generated by hydrothermal fluids (mostly water) during the cooling of plutons or volcanic systems. The porphyry mineralization further benefited from the dry climate that reduced the disturbing actions of meteoric water. The dry climate in the central western Andes has also led to the creation of extensive saltpeter deposits that were extensively mined until the invention of synthetic nitrates. Yet another result of the dry climate are the salars of Atacama and Uyuni, the former being the largest source of lithium and the latter the world's largest reserve of the element. Early Mesozoic and Neogene plutonism in Bolivia's Cordillera Central created the Bolivian tin belt as well as the famous, now mostly depleted, silver deposits of Cerro Rico de Potosí.

=== Climate ===
The Andes Mountains is connected to the climate of South America, particularly through the hyper-arid conditions of the adjacent Atacama Desert. The Atacama Bench, a prominent low-relief feature along the Pacific seaboard, serves as a key geomorphological record of the long-term interplay between Andean tectonics and Cenozoic climate. While the initial uplift and shortening of the Andes were driven by the subduction of the Nazca Plate beneath the South American Plate, arid climate acted as an important feedback mechanism. Reduced erosion rates in the increasingly arid Atacama region may have effectively stopped tectonic activity in certain parts of the mountain range. This lack of erosion could have facilitated the eastward propagation of deformation, leading to the widening of the Andean orogen over time. Thus, the Atacama Desert and its geological features, like the Atacama Bench, offer critical insights into the coupled evolution of the Andes Mountains and the changing regional climate.

== History ==
The Andes Mountains, initially inhabited by hunter-gatherers, experienced the development of agriculture and the rise of politically centralized civilizations, which culminated in the establishment of the century-long Inca Empire. This all changed in the 16th century, when the Spanish conquistadors colonized the mountains in advance of the mining economy.

In the tide of anti-imperialist nationalism, the Andes became the scene of a series of independence wars in the 19th century, when rebel forces swept through the region to overthrow Spanish colonial rule. Since then, many former Spanish territories have become five independent Andean states.

== Climate and hydrology ==
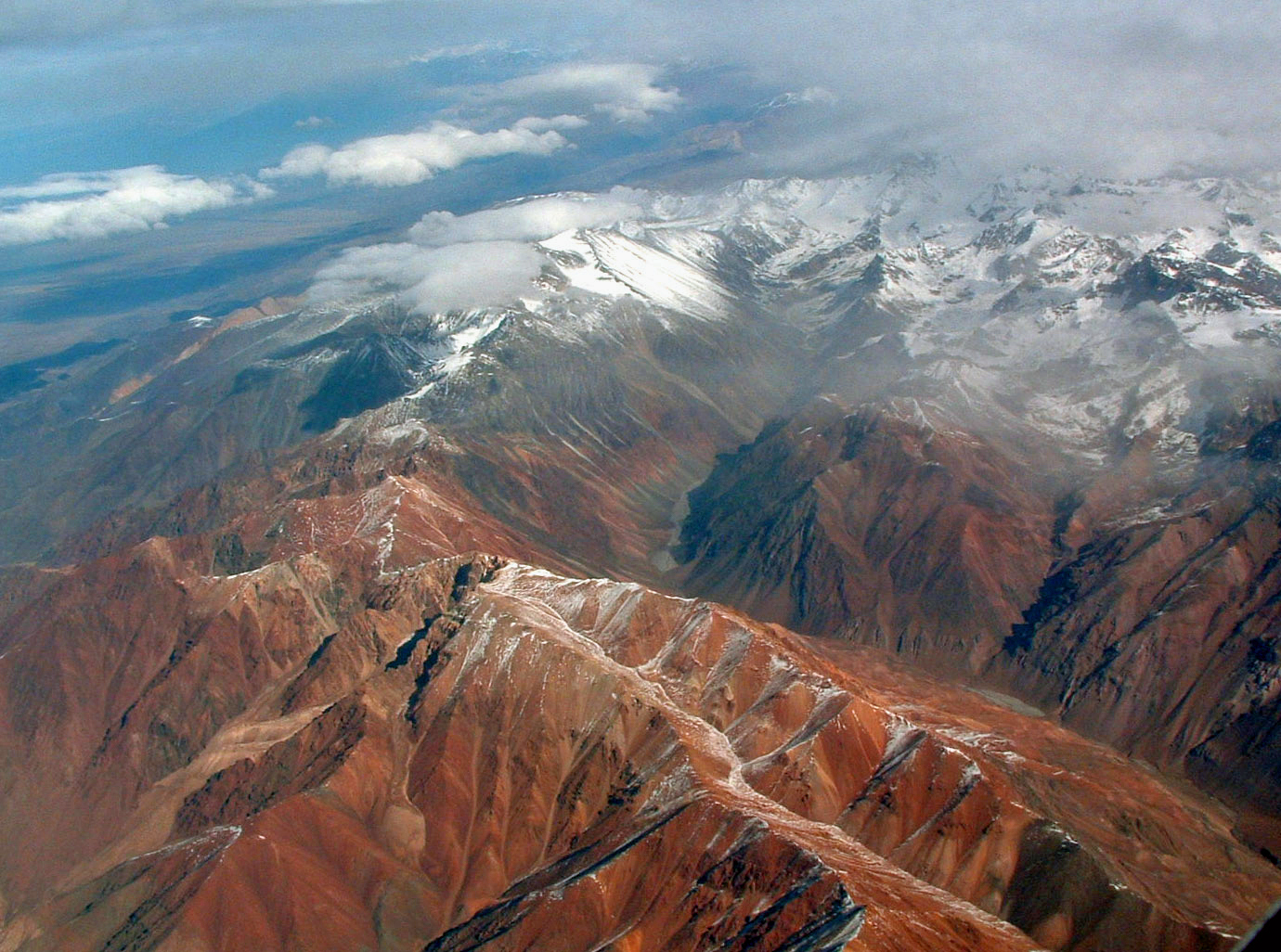
Central Andes

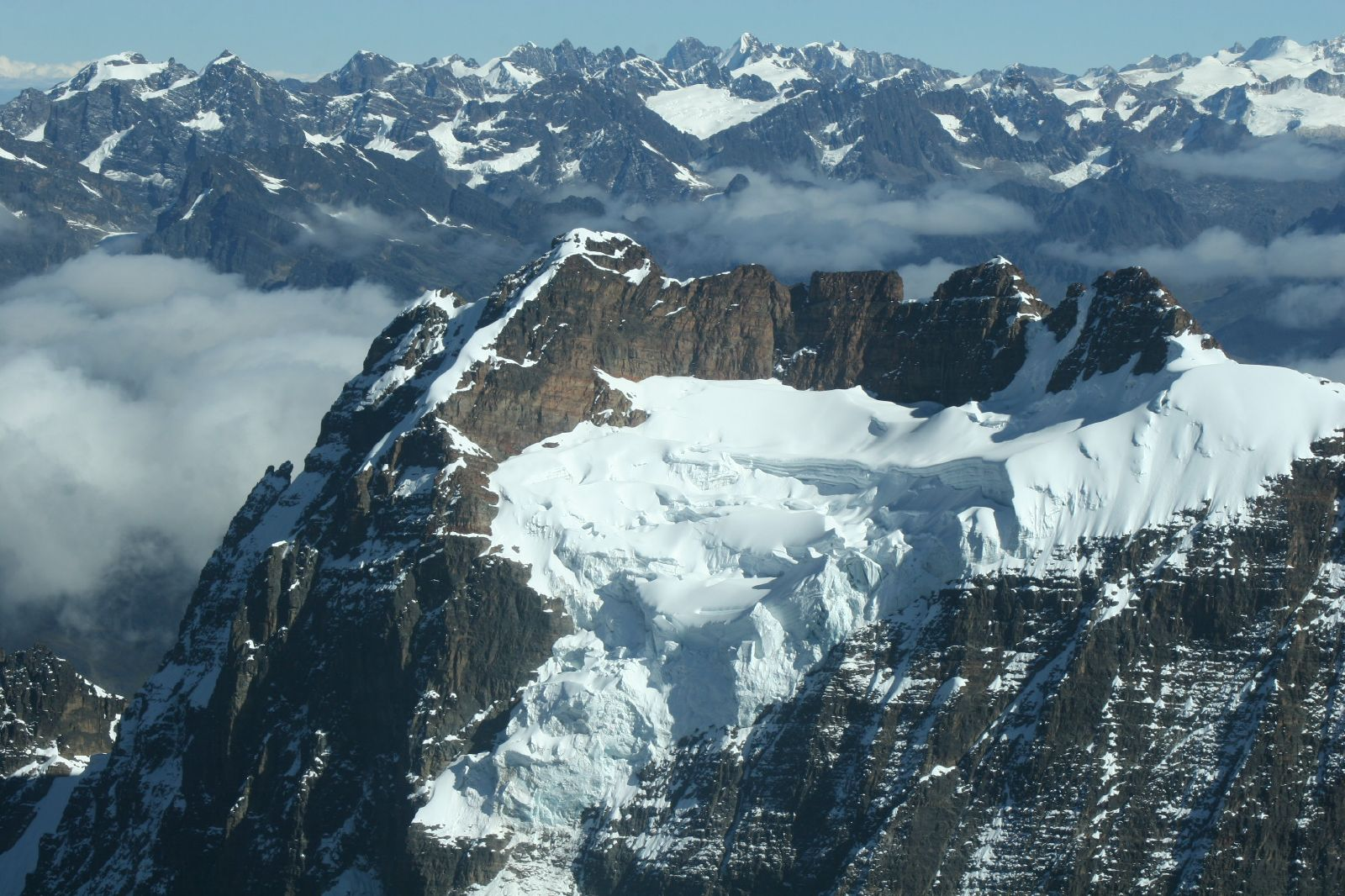
Bolivian Andes

The climate in the Andes varies greatly depending on latitude, altitude, and proximity to the sea. Temperature, atmospheric pressure, and humidity decrease in higher elevations. The southern section is rainy and cool, while the central section is dry. The northern Andes are typically rainy and warm, with an average temperature of 18 °C (64 °F) in Colombia. The climate is known to change drastically in rather short distances. Rainforests exist just kilometers away from the snow-covered peak of Cotopaxi. The mountains have a large effect on the temperatures of nearby areas. The snow line depends on the location. It is between 4,500 and 4,800 m (14,800 and 15,700 ft) in the tropical Ecuadorian, Colombian, Venezuelan, and northern Peruvian Andes, rising to 4,800–5,200 m (15,700–17,100 ft) in the drier mountains of southern Peru and northern Chile south to about 30°S before descending to 4,500 m (14,760 ft) on Aconcagua at 32°S, 2,000 m (6,600 ft) at 40°S, 500 m (1,640 ft) at 50°S, and only 300 m (980 ft) in Tierra del Fuego at 55°S; from 50°S, several of the larger glaciers descend to sea level.

The Andes of Chile and Argentina can be divided into two climatic and glaciological zones: the Dry Andes and the Wet Andes. Since the Dry Andes extend from the latitudes of the Atacama Desert to the area of the Maule River, precipitation is more sporadic, and there are strong temperature oscillations. The line of equilibrium may shift drastically over short periods of time, leaving a whole glacier in the ablation area or in the accumulation area.

In the high Andes of Central Chile and Mendoza Province, rock glaciers are larger and more common than glaciers; this is due to the high exposure to solar radiation. In these regions, glaciers occur typically at higher altitudes than rock glaciers. The lowest active rock glaciers occur at 900 m a.s.l. in Aconcagua.

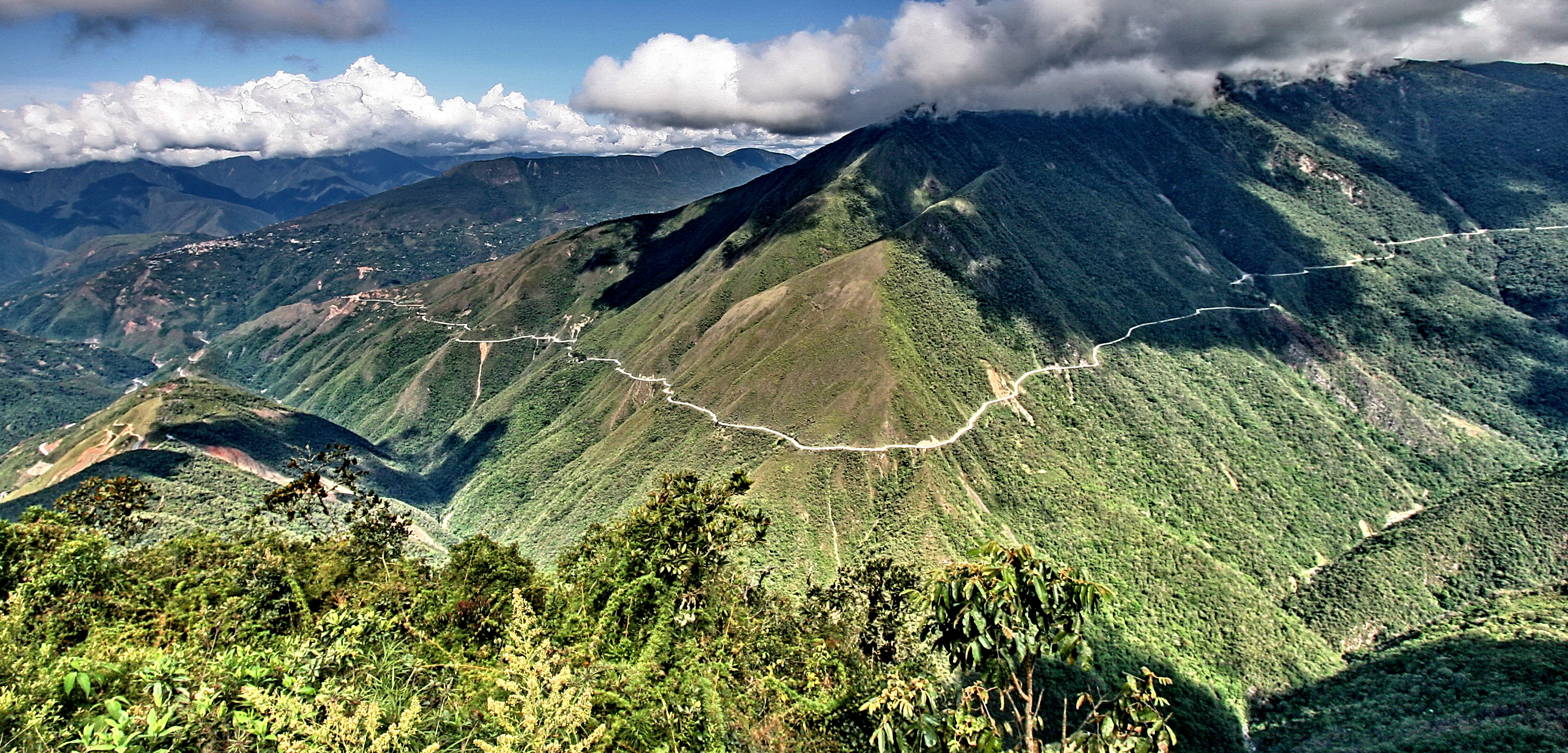
The Yungas region between Bolivia and Peru, part of the tropical andes

Though precipitation increases with height, there are semiarid conditions in the nearly 7,000-metre (22,966 ft) highest mountains of the Andes. This dry steppe climate is considered to be typical of the subtropical position at 32–34° S. The valley bottoms have no woods, just dwarf scrub. The largest glaciers, for example the Plomo Glacier and the Horcones Glaciers, do not even reach 10 km (6.2 mi) in length and have only insignificant ice thickness. At glacial times, however, c. 20,000 years ago, the glaciers were over ten times longer. On the east side of this section of the Mendozina Andes, they flowed down to 2,060 m (6,760 ft) and on the west side to about 1,220 m (4,000 ft) above sea level. The massifs of Aconcagua (6,961 m or 22,838 ft), Tupungato (6,550 m or 21,490 ft), and Nevado Juncal (6,110 m or 20,050 ft) are tens of kilometres away from each other and were connected by a joint ice stream network. The Andes' dendritic glacier arms, components of valley glaciers, were up to 112.5 km (69.9 mi) long and over 1,250 m (4,100 ft) thick, and spanned a vertical distance of 5,150 m (16,900 ft). The climatic glacier snowline (ELA) was lowered from 4,600 m (15,100 ft) to 3,200 m (10,500 ft) at glacial times.

== Flora ==
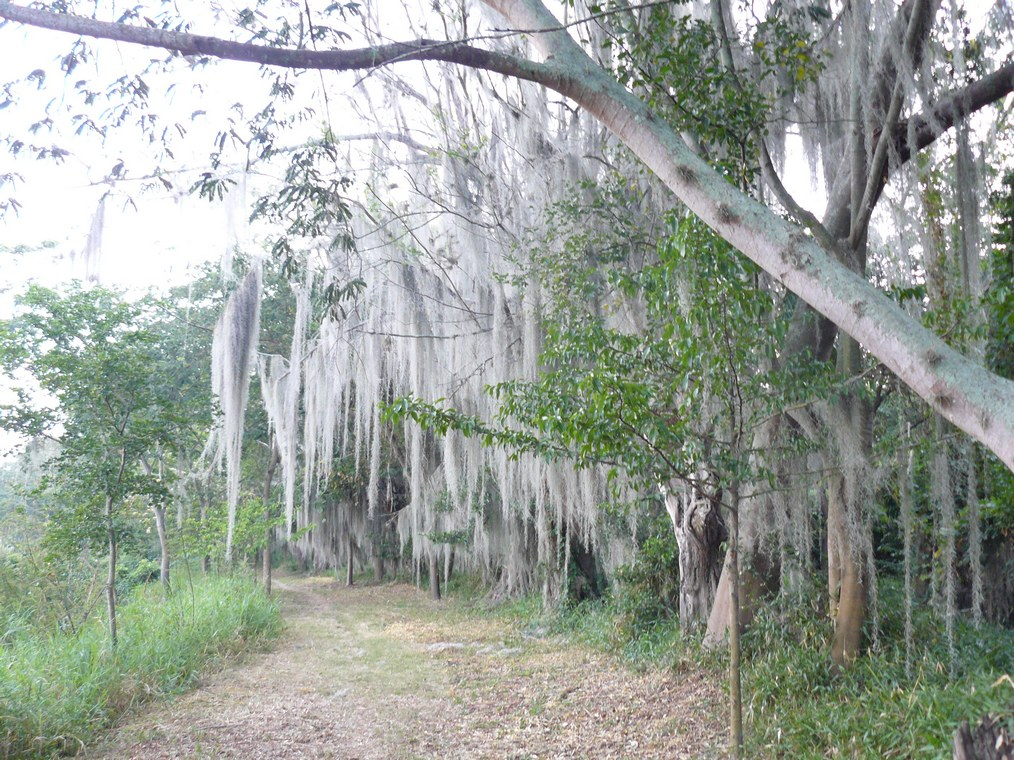
Laguna de Sonso tropical dry forest in Northern Andes

The Andean region cuts across several natural and floristic regions, due to its extension, from Caribbean Venezuela to cold, windy, and wet Cape Horn passing through the hyperarid Atacama Desert. Rainforests and tropical dry forests used to encircle much of the northern Andes but are now greatly diminished, especially in the Chocó and inter-Andean valleys of Colombia. Opposite the humid Andean slopes are the relatively dry Andean slopes in most of western Peru, Chile, and Argentina. Along with several Interandean Valles, they are typically dominated by deciduous woodland, shrub and xeric vegetation, reaching the extreme in the slopes near the virtually lifeless Atacama Desert.

About 30,000 species of vascular plants live in the Andes, with roughly half being endemic to the region, surpassing the diversity of any other hotspot. The small tree Cinchona pubescens, a source of quinine that is used to treat malaria, is found widely in the Andes as far south as Bolivia. Other important crops that originated from the Andes are tobacco and potatoes. The high-altitude Polylepis forests and woodlands are found in the Andean areas of Colombia, Ecuador, Peru, Bolivia, and Chile. These trees, by locals referred to as Queñua, Yagual, and other names, can be found at altitudes of 4,500 m (14,760 ft) above sea level. It remains unclear if the patchy distribution of these forests and woodlands is natural, or the result of clearing that began during the Incan period. Regardless, in modern times, the clearance has accelerated, and the trees are now considered highly endangered, with some believing that as little as 10% of the original woodland remains.

== Fauna ==
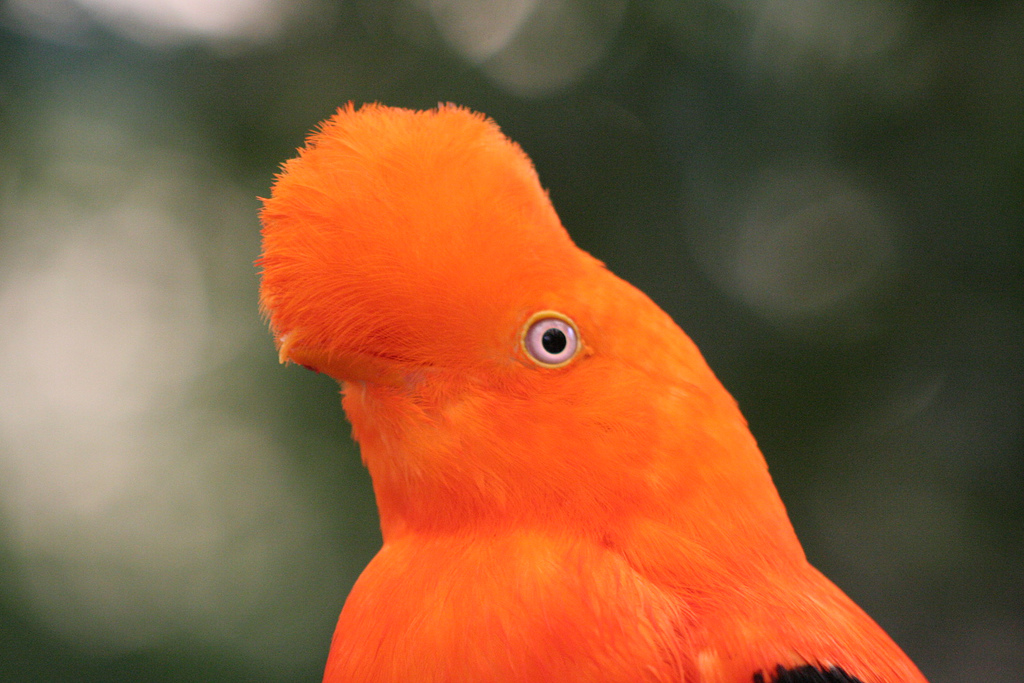
A male Andean cock-of-the-rock, a species found in humid Andean forests and the national bird of Peru

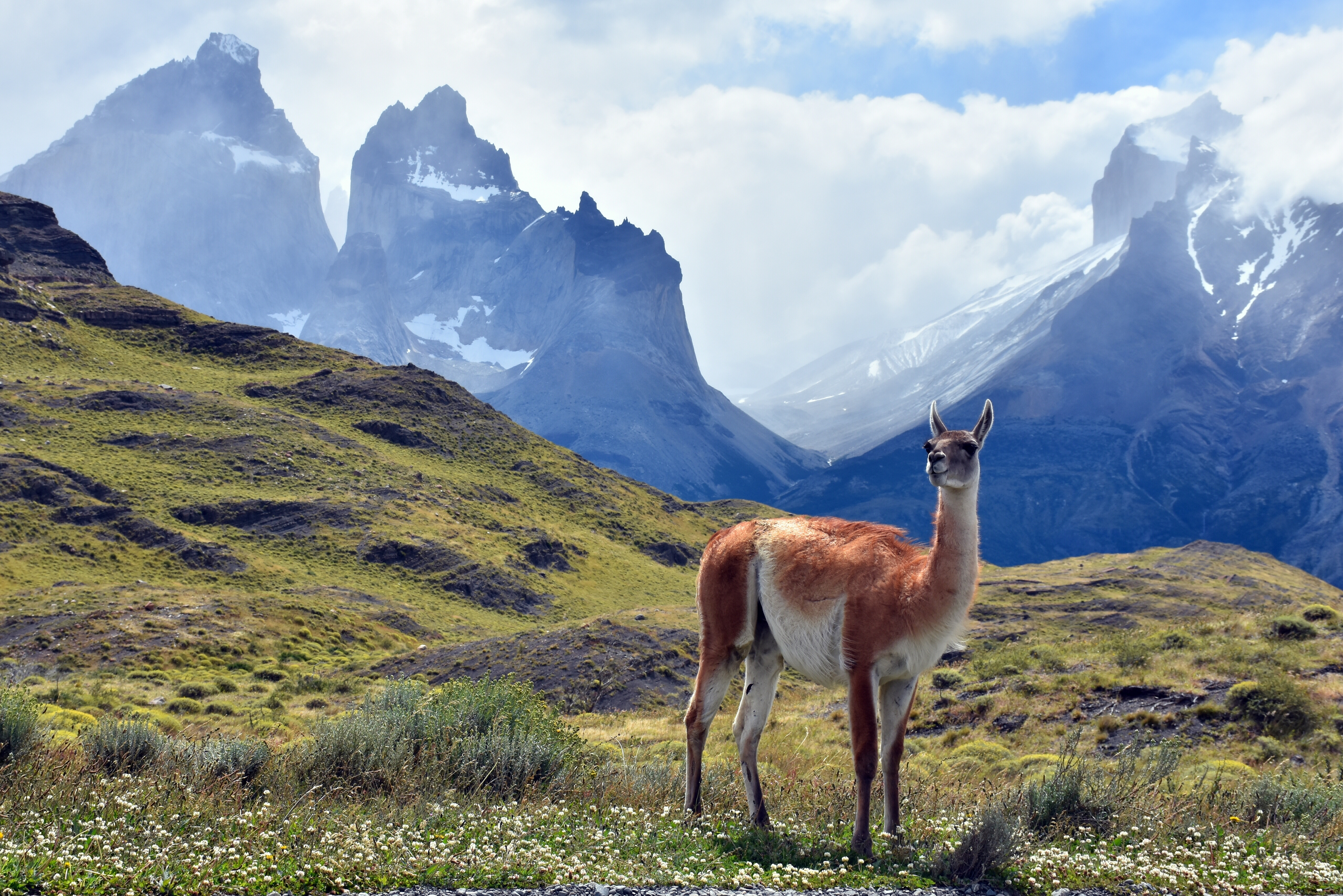
A guanaco in Torres del Paine National Park, Chile.

The Andes are rich in fauna: With almost 1,000 species, of which roughly 2/3 are endemic to the region, the Andes are the most important region in the world for amphibians. The diversity of animals in the Andes is high, with almost 600 species of mammals (13% endemic), more than 1,700 species of birds (about 1/3 endemic), more than 600 species of reptiles (about 45% endemic), and almost 400 species of fish (about 1/3 endemic).

The vicuña and guanaco can be found living in the Altiplano, while the closely related domesticated llama and alpaca are widely kept by locals as pack animals and for their meat and wool. The crepuscular (active during dawn and dusk) chinchillas, two threatened members of the rodent order, inhabit the Andes' alpine regions. The Andean condor, the largest bird of its kind in the Western Hemisphere, occurs throughout much of the Andes but generally in very low densities. Other animals found in the relatively open habitats of the high Andes include the huemul, cougar, foxes in the genus Pseudalopex, and, for birds, certain species of tinamous (notably members of the genus Nothoprocta), Andean goose, giant coot, flamingos (mainly associated with hypersaline lakes), lesser rhea, Andean flicker, diademed sandpiper-plover, miners, sierra-finches and diuca-finches.

Lake Titicaca hosts several endemics, among them the highly endangered Titicaca flightless grebe and Titicaca water frog. A few species of hummingbirds, notably some hillstars, can be seen at altitudes above 4,000 m (13,100 ft), but far higher diversities can be found at lower altitudes, especially in the humid Andean forests ("cloud forests") growing on slopes in Colombia, Ecuador, Peru, Bolivia, and far northwestern Argentina. These forest-types, which includes the Yungas and parts of the Chocó, are very rich in flora and fauna, although few large mammals exist, exceptions being the threatened mountain tapir, spectacled bear, and yellow-tailed woolly monkey.

Birds of humid Andean forests include mountain toucans, quetzals, and the Andean cock-of-the-rock, while mixed-species flocks dominated by tanagers and furnariids are commonly seen—in contrast to several vocal but typically cryptic species of wrens, tapaculos, and antpittas.

A number of species such as the royal cinclodes and white-browed tit-spinetail are associated with Polylepis, and consequently also threatened.

== Human activity ==
The Andes Mountains form a north–south axis of cultural influences. A long series of cultural development culminated in the expansion of the Inca civilization and Inca Empire in the central Andes during the 15th century. The Incas formed this civilization through imperialistic militarism as well as careful and meticulous governmental management. The government sponsored the construction of aqueducts and roads in addition to pre-existing installations. Some of these constructions still exist today.

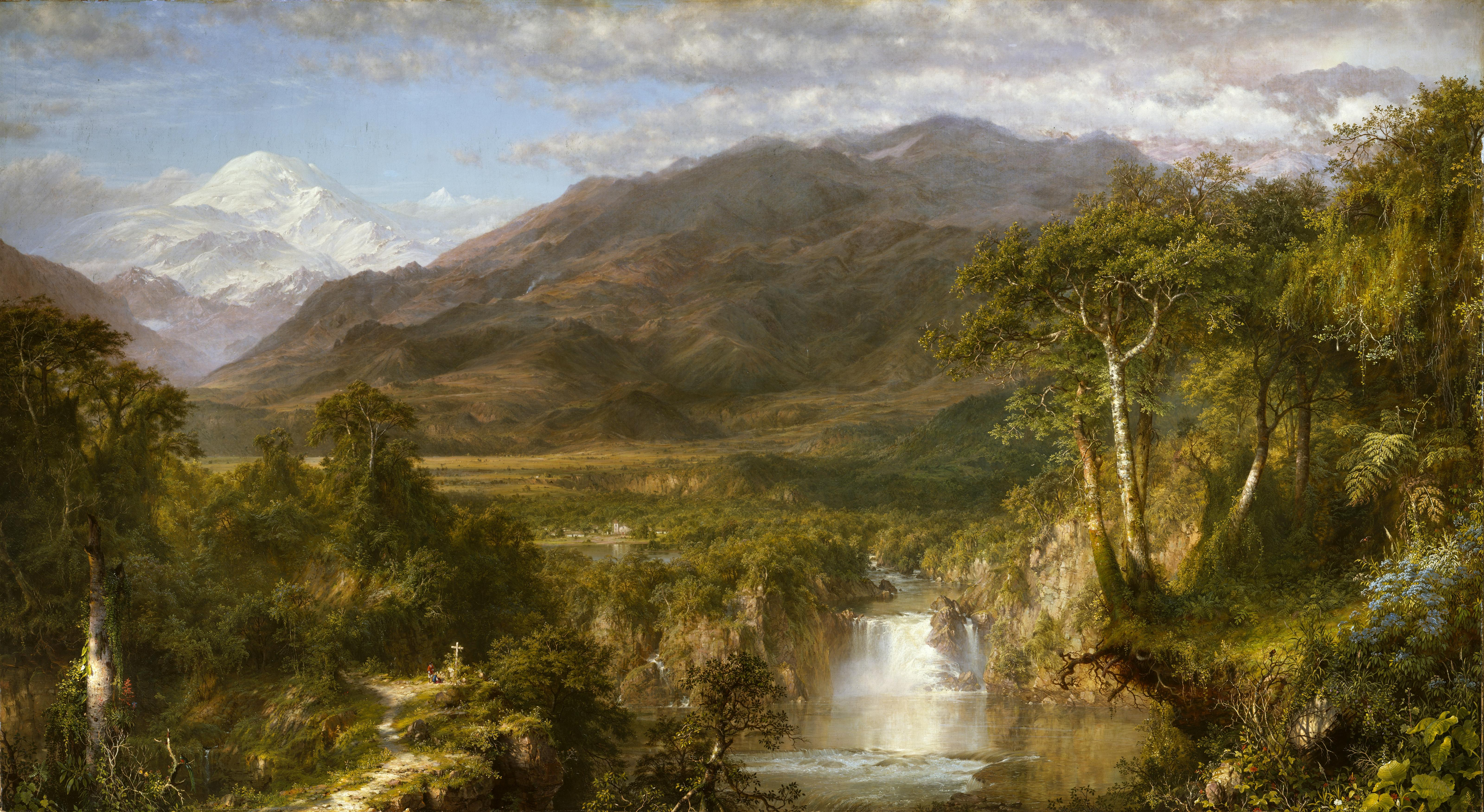
Frederic Edwin Church, Heart of the Andes, 1859.

Devastated by European diseases and by civil war, the Incas were defeated in 1532 by an alliance composed of tens of thousands of allies from nations they had subjugated (e.g. Huancas, Chachapoyas, Cañaris) and a small army of 180 Spaniards led by Francisco Pizarro. One of the few Inca sites the Spanish never found in their conquest was Machu Picchu, which lay hidden on a peak on the eastern edge of the Andes where they descend to the Amazon. The main surviving languages of the Andean peoples are those of the Quechua and Aymara language families. Woodbine Parish and Joseph Barclay Pentland surveyed a large part of the Bolivian Andes from 1826 to 1827.

=== Cities ===
In modern times, the largest cities in the Andes are Bogotá, with a metropolitan population of over ten million, and Santiago, Medellín, Cali, and Quito. Lima is a coastal city adjacent to the Andes and is the largest city of all Andean countries. It is the seat of the Andean Community of Nations.

La Paz, Bolivia's seat of government, is the highest capital city in the world, at an elevation of approximately 3,650 m (11,975 ft). Parts of the La Paz conurbation, including the city of El Alto, extend up to 4,200 m (13,780 ft).

Other cities in or near the Andes include Bariloche, Catamarca, Jujuy, Mendoza, Salta, San Juan, Tucumán, and Ushuaia in Argentina; Calama and Rancagua in Chile; Cochabamba, Oruro, Potosí, Sucre, Tarija, and Yacuiba in Bolivia; Arequipa, Cajamarca, Cusco, Huancayo, Huánuco, Huaraz, Juliaca, and Puno in Peru; Ambato, Cuenca, Ibarra, Latacunga, Loja, Riobamba, and Tulcán in Ecuador; Armenia, Cúcuta, Bucaramanga, Duitama, Ibagué, Ipiales, Manizales, Palmira, Pasto, Pereira, Popayán, Rionegro, Sogamoso, Tunja, and Villavicencio in Colombia; and Barquisimeto, La Grita, Mérida, San Cristóbal, Tovar, Trujillo, and Valera in Venezuela. The cities of Caracas, Valencia, and Maracay are in the Venezuelan Coastal Range, which is a debatable extension of the Andes at the northern extremity of South America.

Major cities in the Andes

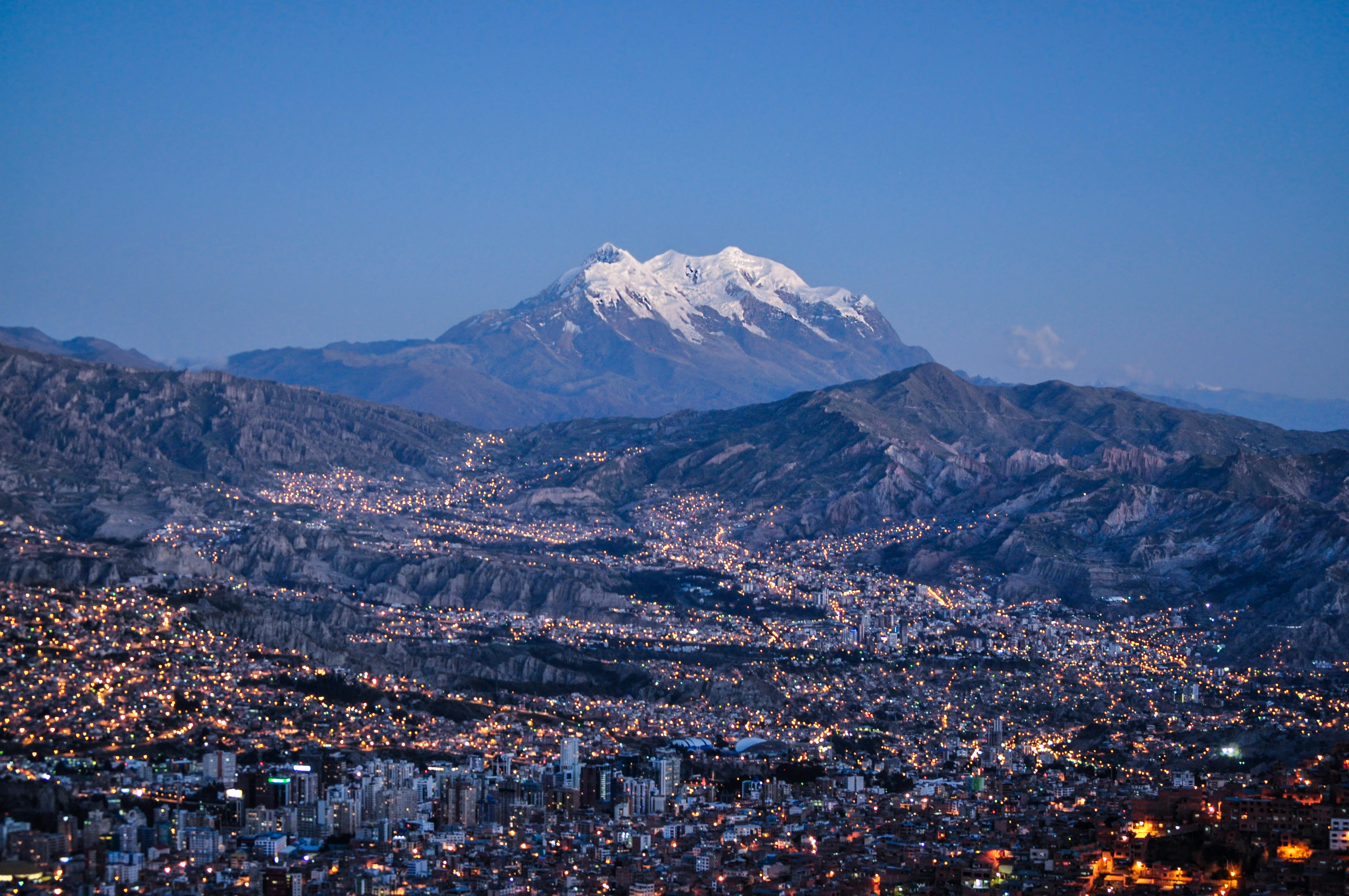
La Paz, Bolivia, the world's highest capital city.

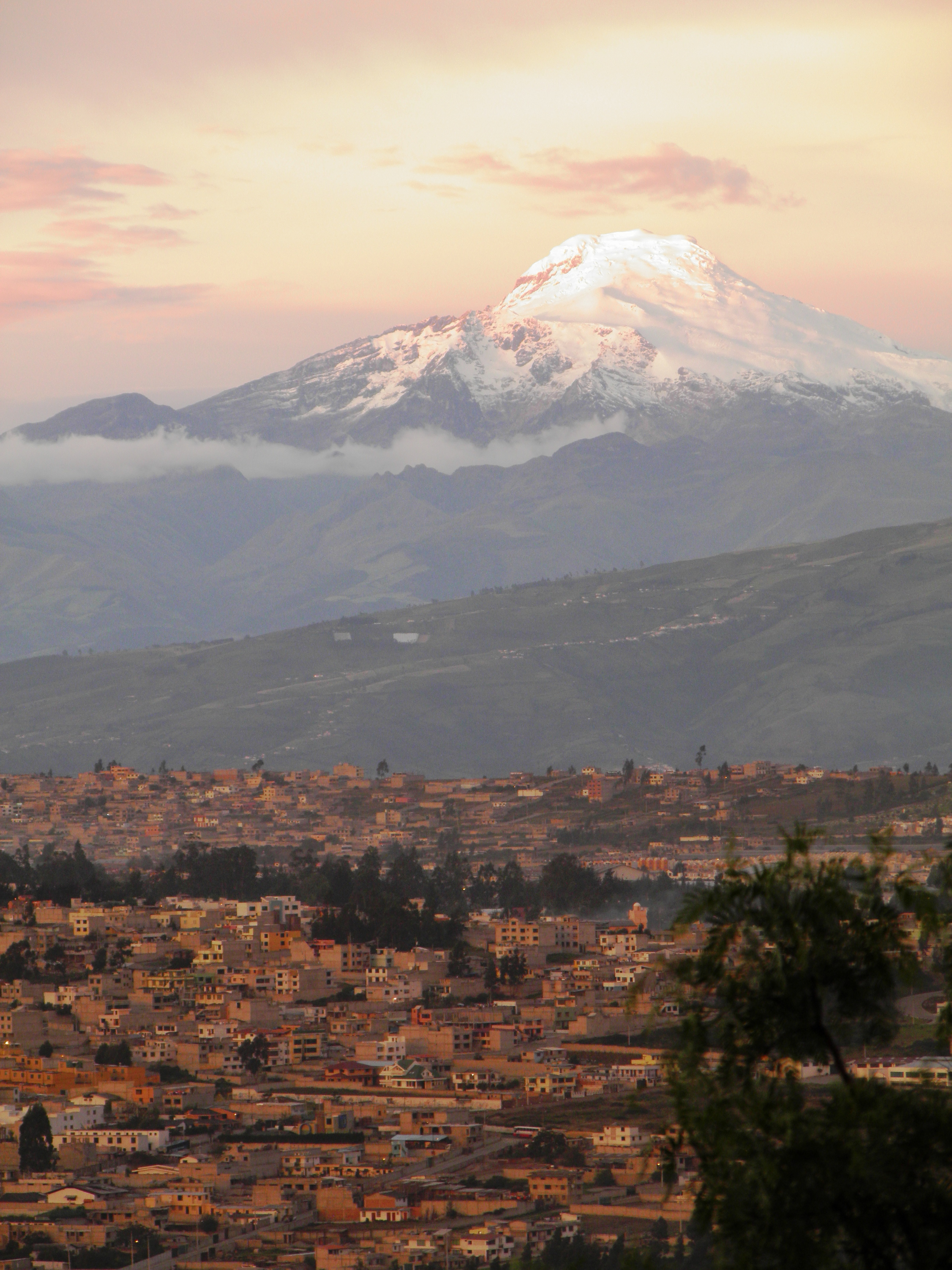
Quito, Ecuador

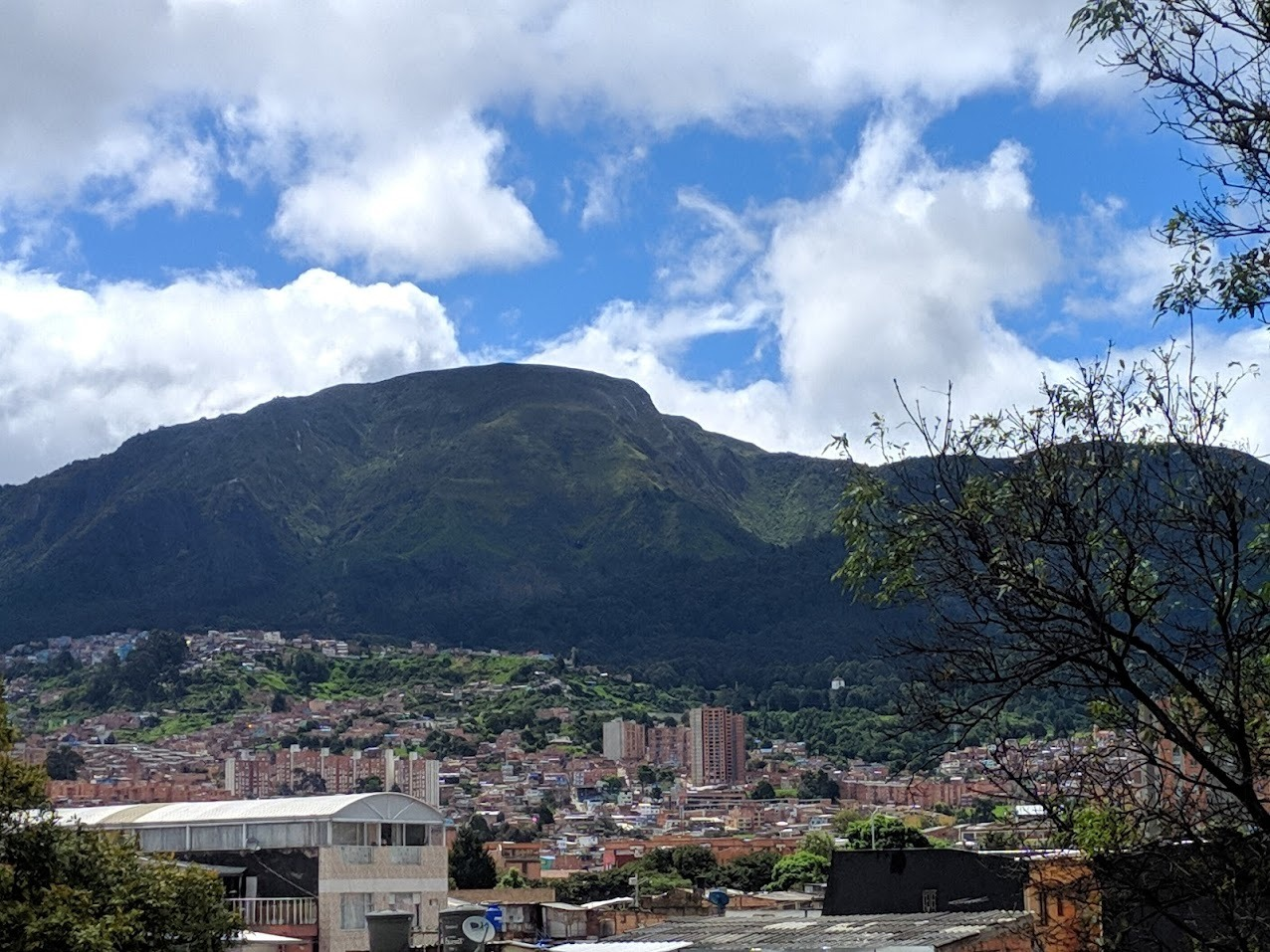
Bogotá, Colombia

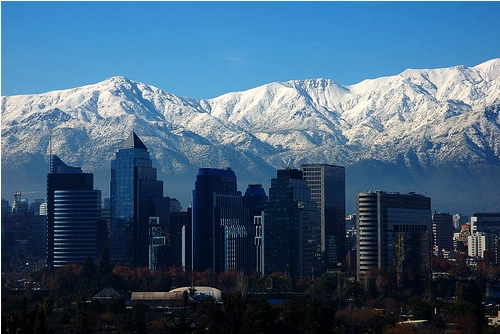
Santiago, Chile

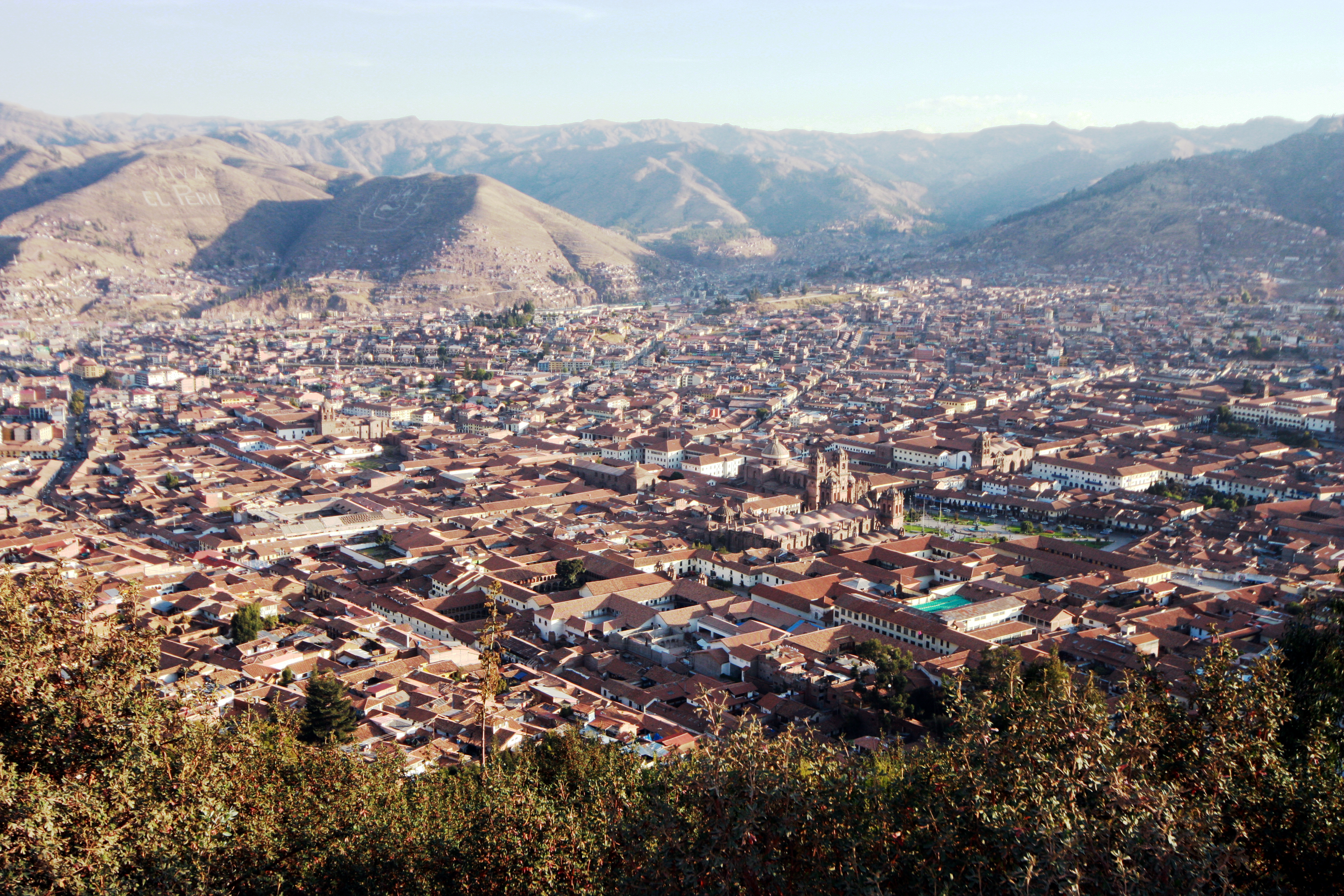
Cusco, Peru

=== Transportation ===
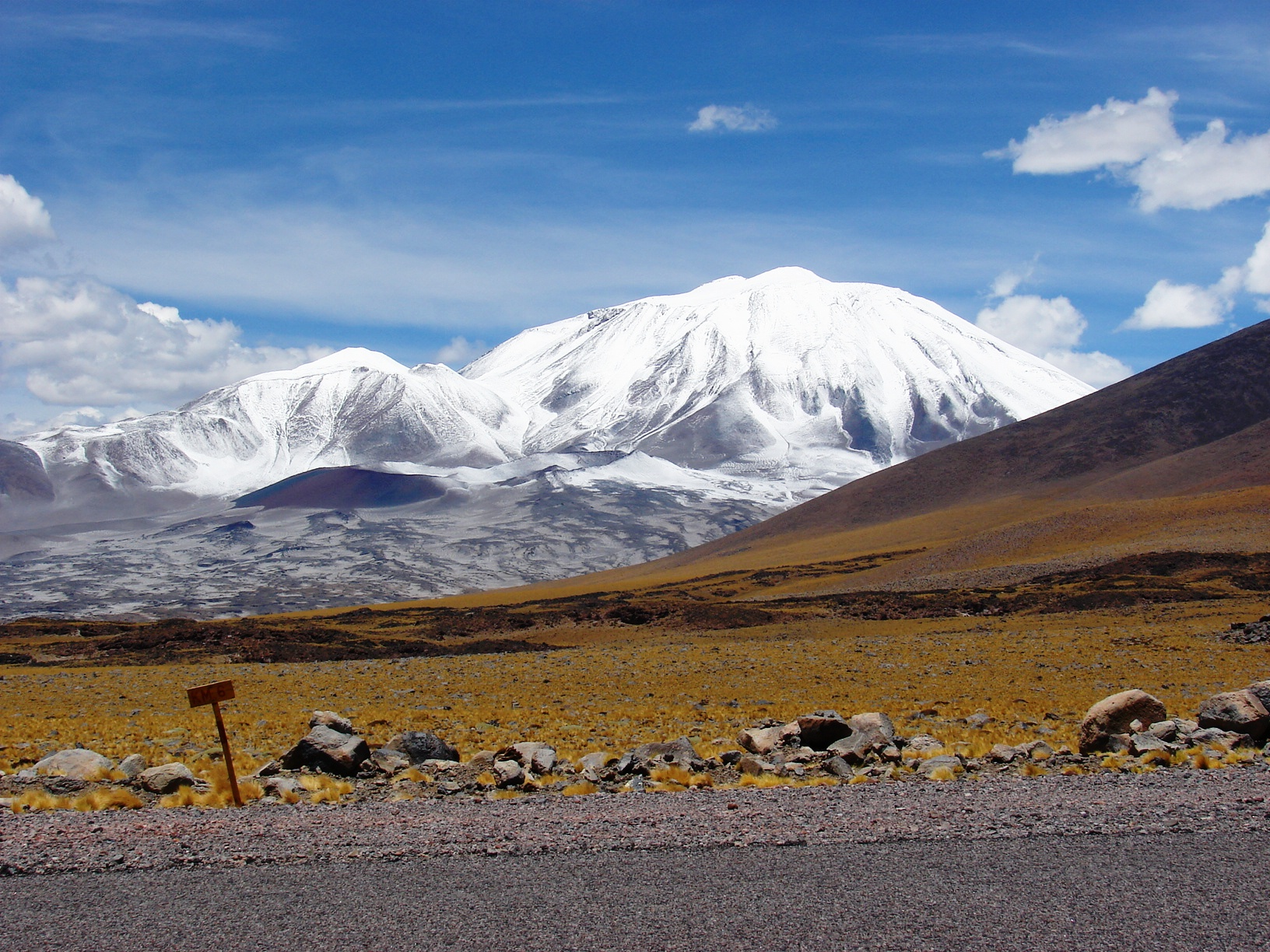
The Paso de Jama between Jujuy (Argentina) and Antofagasta (Chile).

Cities and large towns are connected with asphalt-paved roads, while smaller towns are often connected by dirt roads, which may require a four-wheel-drive vehicle.

The rough terrain has historically put the costs of building highways and railroads that cross the Andes out of reach of most neighboring countries, even with modern civil engineering practices. For example, the main crossover of the Andes between Argentina and Chile is still accomplished through the Paso Internacional Los Libertadores. Only recently have the ends of some highways that came rather close to one another from the east and the west been connected. Much of the transportation of passengers is done via aircraft.

There is one railroad that connects Chile with Peru via the Andes, however, and there are others that make the same connection via southern Bolivia.

There are multiple highways in Bolivia that cross the Andes. Some of these were built during a period of war between Bolivia and Paraguay, in order to transport Bolivian troops and their supplies to the war front in the lowlands of southeastern Bolivia and western Paraguay.

For decades, Chile claimed ownership of land on the eastern side of the Andes. These claims were given up in about 1870 during the War of the Pacific between Chile and the allied Bolivia and Peru, in a diplomatic deal to keep Peru out of the war. The Chilean Army and Chilean Navy defeated the combined forces of Bolivia and Peru, and Chile took over Bolivia's only province on the Pacific Coast, some land from Peru that was returned to Peru decades later. Bolivia has been completely landlocked ever since. It mostly uses seaports in eastern Argentina and Uruguay for international trade because its diplomatic relations with Chile have been suspended since 1978.

Because of the tortuous terrain in places, villages and towns in the mountains—to which travel via motorized vehicles is of little use—are still located in the high Andes of Chile, Bolivia, Peru, and Ecuador. Locally, the relatives of the camel, the llama, and the alpaca continue to carry out important uses as pack animals, but this use has generally diminished in modern times. Donkeys, mules, and horses are also useful.

=== Agriculture ===
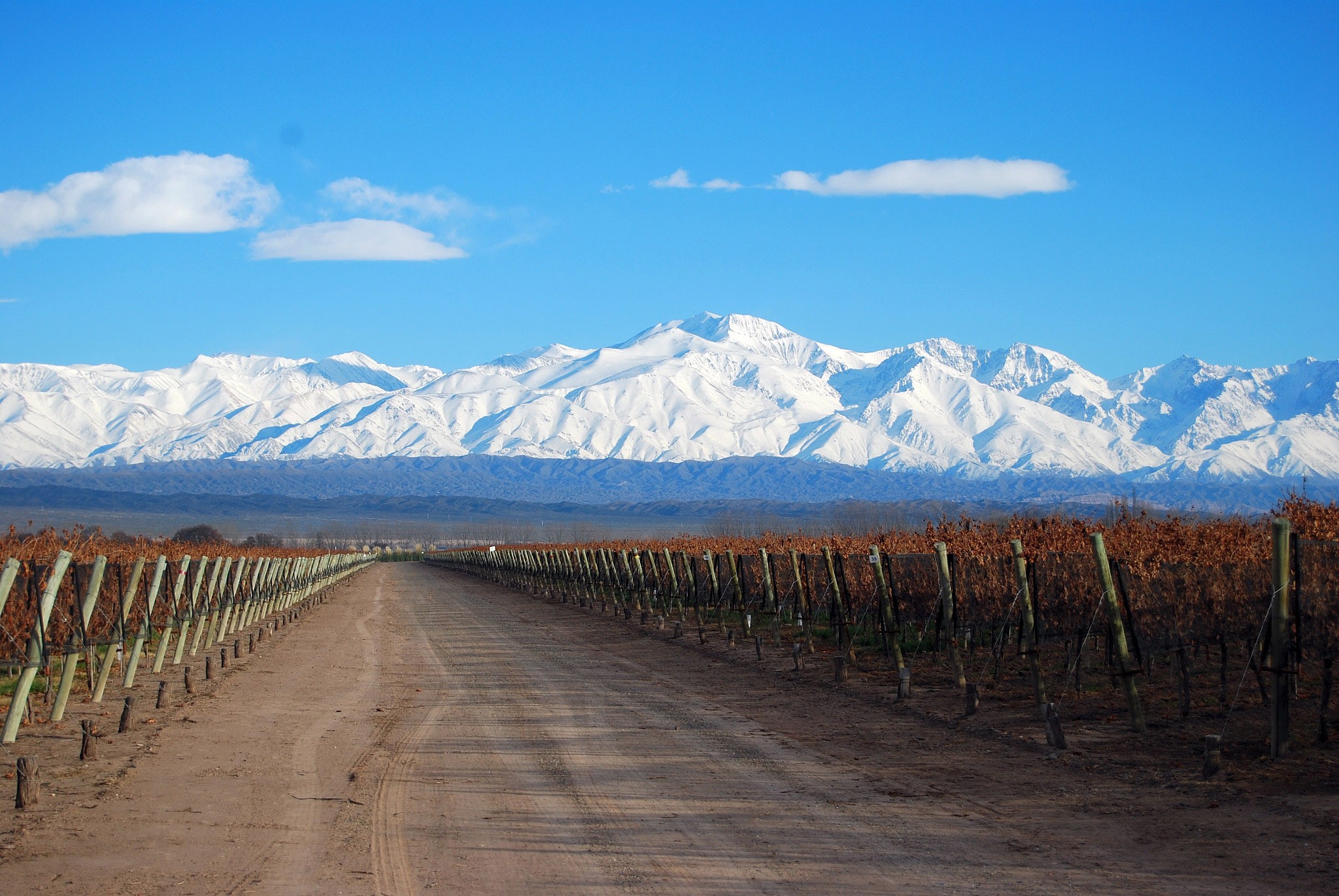
Chakana Winery Plantation in Luján de Cuyo, Argentina.

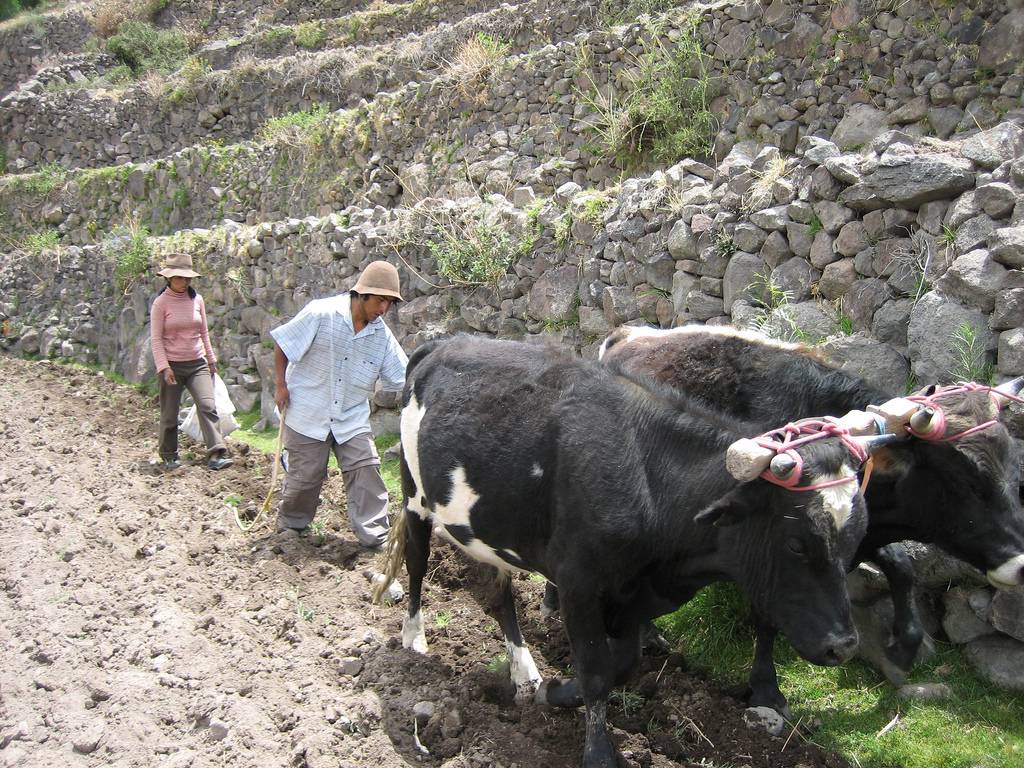
Peruvian farmers sowing maize and beans.

The ancient peoples of the Andes such as the Incas have practiced irrigation techniques for over 6,000 years. Because of the mountain slopes, terracing has been a common practice. Terracing, however, was only extensively employed after Incan imperial expansions to fuel their expanding realm. The potato holds a very important role as an internally consumed staple crop. Maize was also an important crop for these people, and was used for the production of chicha, important to Andean native people. Currently, tobacco, cotton, quinoa, and coffee are the main export crops. Coca, despite eradication programs in some countries, remains an important crop for legal local use in a mildly stimulating herbal tea, and illegally for the production of cocaine.

=== Irrigation ===
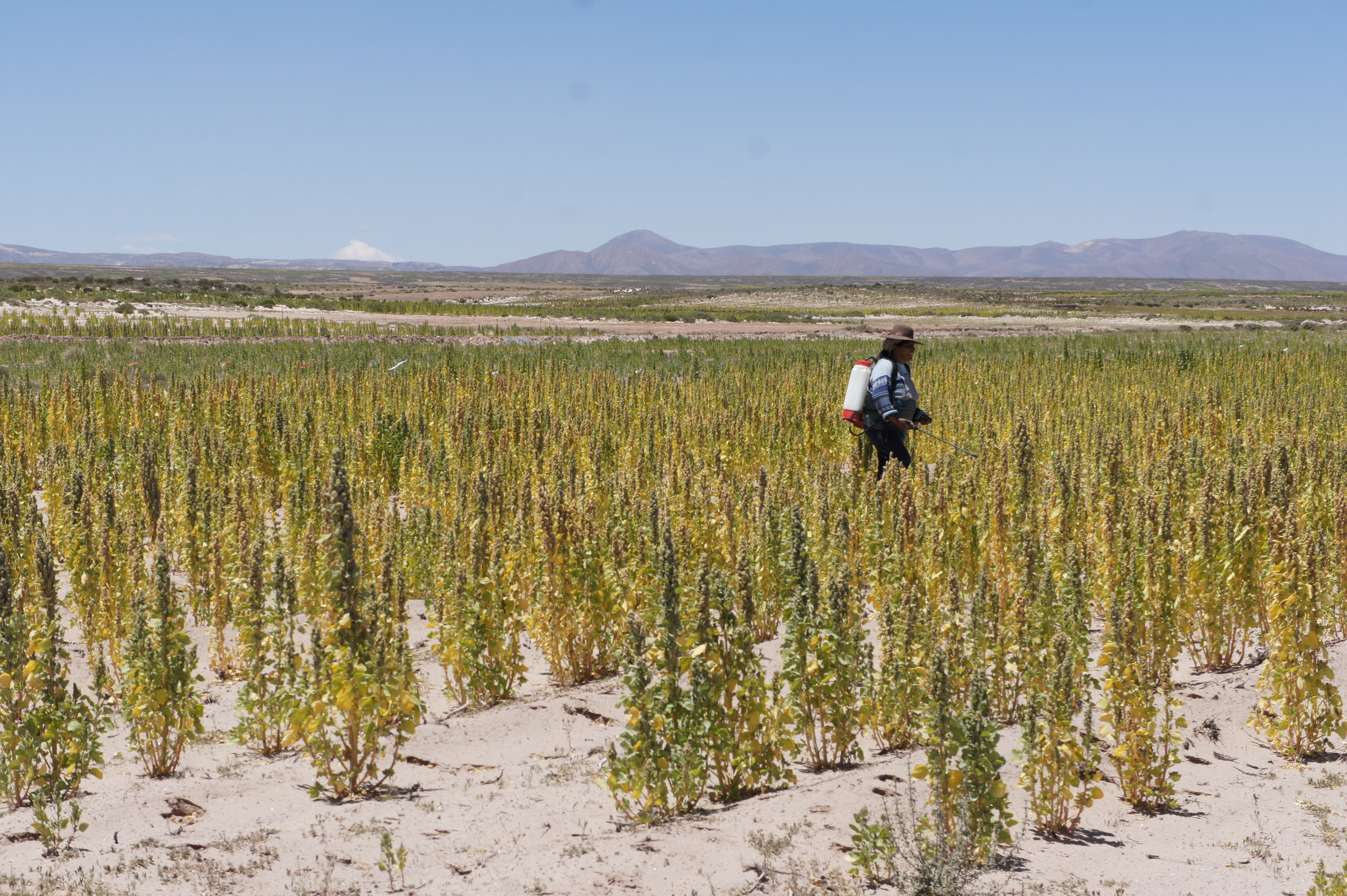
A quinoa field in the Bolivian altiplano

In unirrigated land, pasture is the most common type of land use. In the rainy season (summer), part of the rangeland is used for cropping (mainly potatoes, barley, broad beans, and wheat).

Irrigation is helpful in advancing the sowing data of the summer crops, which guarantees an early yield in periods of food shortage. Also, by early sowing, maize can be cultivated higher up in the mountains (up to 3,800 m (12,500 ft)). In addition, it makes cropping in the dry season (winter) possible and allows the cultivation of frost-resistant vegetable crops like onion and carrot.

=== Mining ===
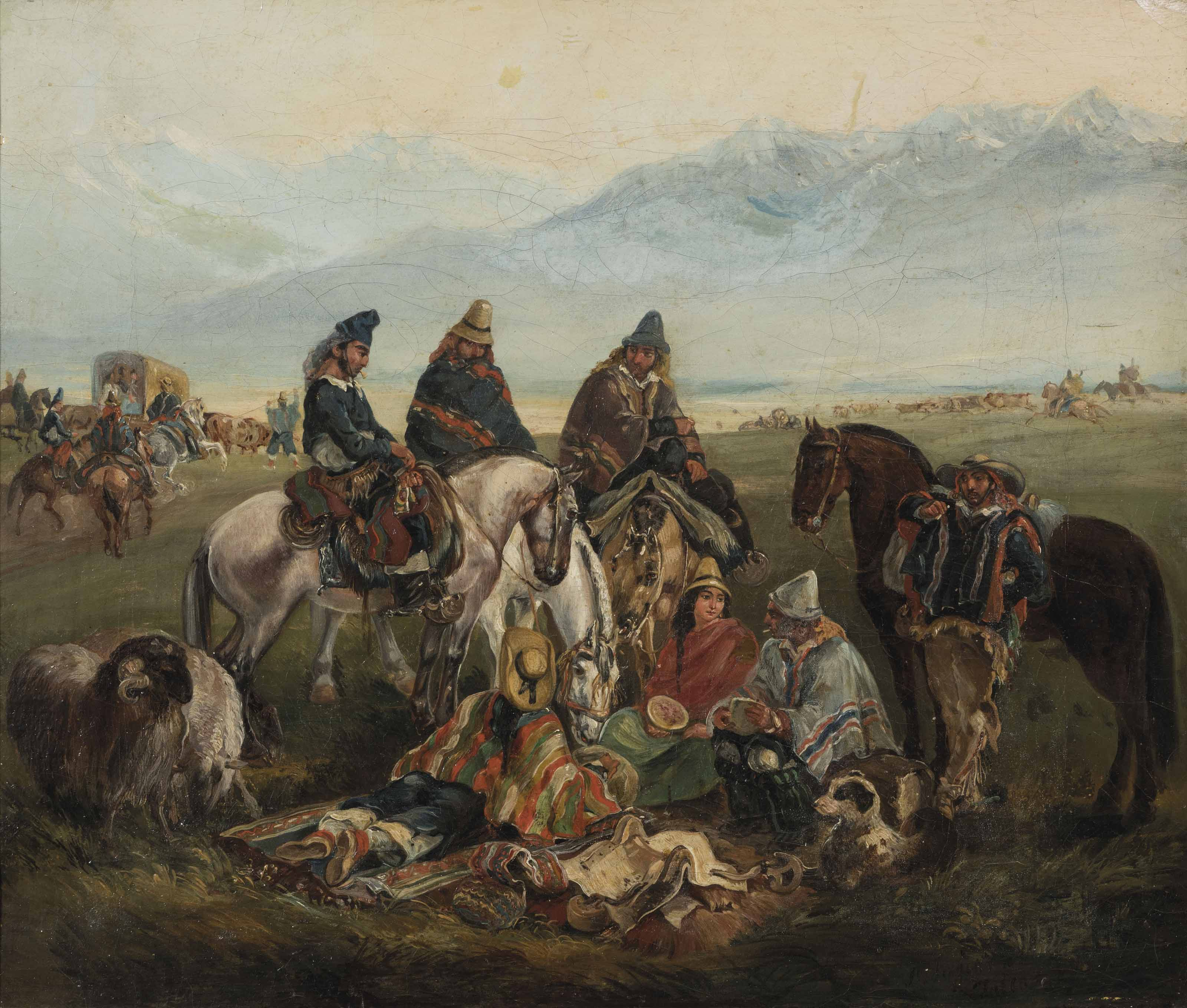
Chilean huasos, 19th century

The Andes rose to fame for their mineral wealth during the Spanish conquest of South America. Although Andean Amerindian peoples crafted ceremonial jewelry of gold and other metals, the mineralizations of the Andes were first mined on a large scale after the Spanish arrival. Potosí in present-day Bolivia and Cerro de Pasco in Peru were among the principal mines of the Spanish Empire in the New World. Río de la Plata and Argentina derive their names from the silver of Potosí.

Currently, mining in the Andes of Chile and Peru places these countries as the first and second major producers of copper in the world. Peru also contains the 4th-largest goldmine in the world: the Yanacocha. The Bolivian Andes principally produce tin, although historically silver mining had a huge impact on the economy of 17th-century Europe. In Chile in the higher portions of the Andes there are only mining districts dominated by large-scale mining, while medium and small-scale mining is more common at lower altitudes. For mines in the high Andes there are logistical difficulties in the use of sea water, in addition to increased probabilities of extreme weather events that may disrupt water supply. The gold deposits of the El Indio Gold Belt tend to lie along the Argentina–Chile border and next to or below glaciers and gold mining there have thus issues relating to the bi-nationality and their environmental impacts on glaciers.

Mining in the cold conditions in the Andes pose also difficult conditions for outdoor workers such as pallaqueras and for the batteries of electrified machinery.

There is a long history of mining in the Andes, from the Spanish silver mines in Potosí in the 16th century to the vast current porphyry copper deposits of Chuquicamata and Escondida in Chile and Toquepala in Peru. Other metals, including iron, gold, and tin, in addition to non-metallic resources are important. The Andes have a vast supply of lithium; Argentina, Bolivia, and Chile have the three largest reserves in the world respectively.

== Peaks ==
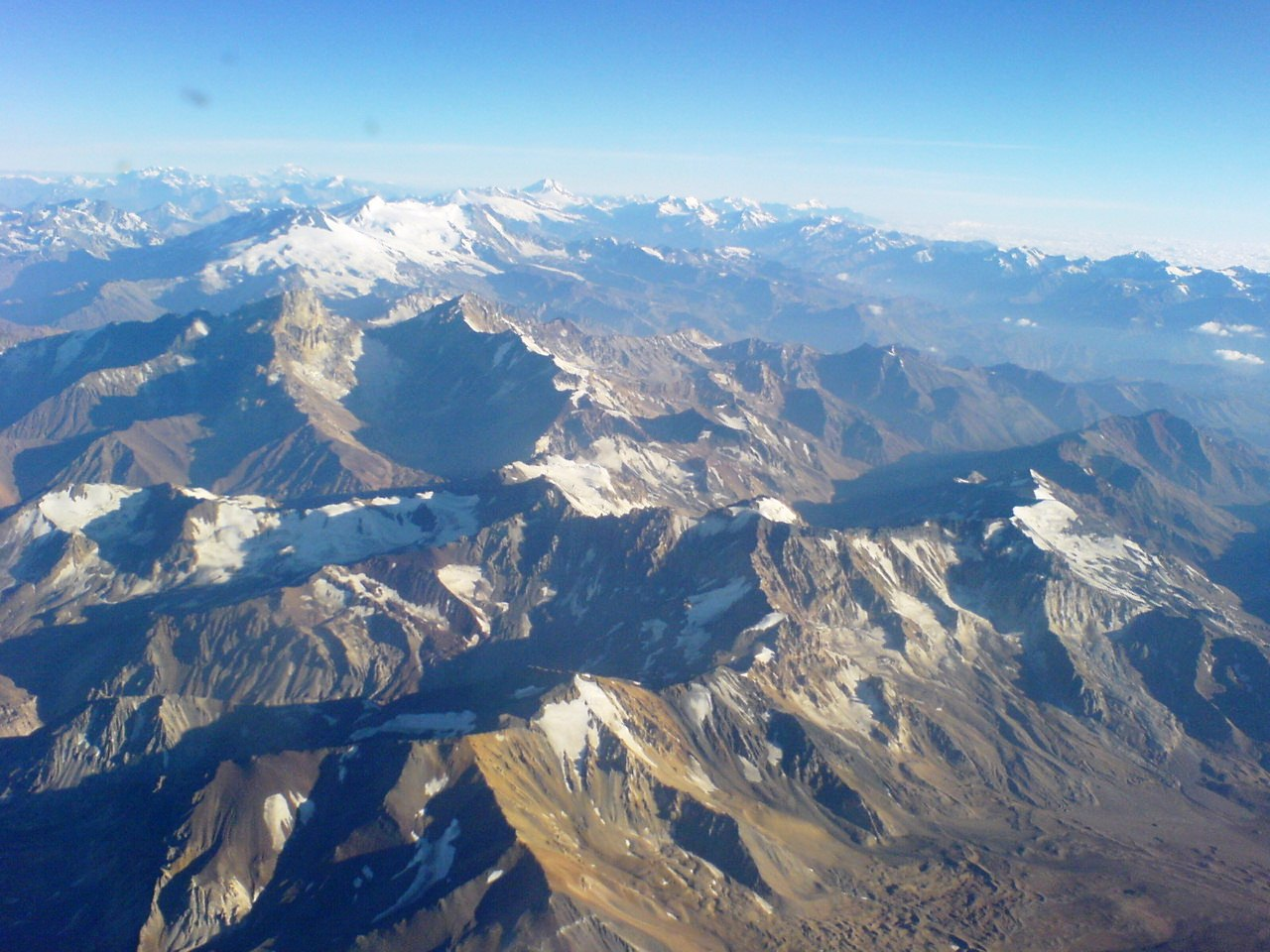
An aerial view of the Andes between Santiago in Chile and Mendoza, Argentina with a large ice field on the southern slope of San José volcano (left), Marmolejo (right), and Tupungato (far right).

This list contains some of the major peaks in the Andes mountain range. The highest peak is Aconcagua of Argentina.

=== Argentina ===
- Aconcagua, 6,961 m (22,838 ft)
- Cerro Bonete, 6,759 m (22,175 ft)
- Galán, 5,912 m (19,396 ft)
- Mercedario, 6,720 m (22,047 ft)
- Pissis, 6,795 m (22,293 ft)

=== The border between Argentina and Chile ===
- Cerro Bayo, 5,401 m (17,720 ft)
- Cerro Fitz Roy, 3,375 m (11,073 ft) or 3,405 m, Patagonia, also known as Cerro Chaltén
- Cerro Escorial, 5,447 m (17,871 ft)
- Cordón del Azufre, 5,463 m (17,923 ft)
- Falso Azufre, 5,890 m (19,324 ft)
- Incahuasi, 6,620 m (21,719 ft)
- Lastarria, 5,697 m (18,691 ft)
- Llullaillaco, 6,739 m (22,110 ft)
- Maipo, 5,264 m (17,270 ft)
- Marmolejo, 6,110 m (20,046 ft)
- Ojos del Salado, 6,893 m (22,615 ft)
- Olca, 5,407 m (17,740 ft)
- Sierra Nevada de Lagunas Bravas, 6,127 m (20,102 ft)
- Socompa, 6,051 m (19,852 ft)
- Nevado Tres Cruces, 6,749 m (22,142 ft) (south summit) (III Region)
- Tronador, 3,491 m (11,453 ft)
- Tupungato, 6,570 m (21,555 ft)
- Nacimiento, 6,492 m (21,299 ft)

=== Bolivia ===
- Janq'u Uma, 6,427 m (21,086 ft)
- Cabaraya, 5,860 m (19,226 ft)
- Cerro Cañapa, 5,882 m (19,298 ft)
- Cerro Lípez, 5,929 m (19,452 ft)
- Cerro Nelly, 5,676 m (18,622 ft)
- Chacaltaya, 5,422 m (17,789 ft)
- Chachacomani, 6,074 m (19,928 ft)
- Chaupi Orco, 6,044 m (19,829 ft)
- Chearoco, 6,127 m (20,102 ft)
- Huayna Potosí, 6,088 m (19,974 ft)
- Illampu, 6,368 m (20,892 ft)
- Illimani, 6,438 m (21,122 ft)
- Kunturiri, 5,648 m (18,530 ft)
- Layqa Qullu, 6,166 m (20,230 ft)
- Laram Q'awa, 5,182 m (17,001 ft)
- Macizo de Pacuni, 5,400 m (17,720 ft)
- Mururata, 5,871 m (19,260 ft)
- Nevado Anallajsi, 5,750 m (18,865 ft)
- Nevado Charquini, 5,392 m (17,690 ft)
- Nevado Sajama, 6,542 m (21,463 ft)
- Patilla Pata, 5,300 m (17,390 ft)
- Pico del Norte, 6,070 m (19,910 ft)
- Tata Sabaya, 5,430 m (17,815 ft)
- Tunari, 5,035 m (16,519 ft)
- Uturuncu, 6,008 m (19,711 ft)
- Wayna Potosí, 4,969 m (16,302 ft)

=== The border between Bolivia and Chile ===
- Acotango, 6,052 m (19,856 ft)
- Aucanquilcha, 6,176 m (20,262 ft)
- Michincha, 5,305 m (17,405 ft)
- Iru Phutunqu, 5,163 m (16,939 ft)
- Licancabur, 5,920 m (19,423 ft)
- Olca, 5,407 m (17,740 ft)
- Parinacota, 6,348 m (20,827 ft)
- Paruma, 5,420 m (17,782 ft)
- Pomerape, 6,282 m (20,610 ft)

=== Chile ===
- Monte San Valentin, 4,058 m (13,314 ft)
- Cerro Paine Grande, 2,884 m (9,462 ft)
- Cerro Macá, c.2,300 m (7,546 ft)
- Monte Darwin, c.2,500 m (8,202 ft)
- Volcan Hudson, c.1,900 m (6,234 ft)
- Cerro Castillo Dynevor, c.1,100 m (3,609 ft)
- Mount Tarn, c.825 m (2,707 ft)
- Polleras, c.5,993 m (19,662 ft)
- Acamarachi, c.6,046 m (19,836 ft)

=== Colombia ===
- Nevado del Huila, 5,365 m (17,602 ft)
- Nevado del Ruiz, 5,321 m (17,457 ft)
- Nevado del Tolima, 5,205 m (17,077 ft)
- Pico Pan de Azúcar, 5,200 m (17,060 ft)
- Ritacuba Negro, 5,320 m (17,454 ft)
- Nevado del Cumbal, 4,764 m (15,630 ft)
- Cerro Negro de Mayasquer, 4,445 m (14,583 ft)
- Ritacuba Blanco, 5,410 m (17,749 ft)
- Nevado del Quindío, 5,215 m (17,110 ft)
- Puracé, 4,655 m (15,272 ft)
- Santa Isabel, 4,955 m (16,257 ft)
- Doña Juana, 4,150 m (13,615 ft)
- Galeras, 4,276 m (14,029 ft)
- Azufral, 4,070 m (13,353 ft)

=== Ecuador ===
- Antisana, 5,752 m (18,871 ft)
- Cayambe, 5,790 m (18,996 ft)
- Chiles, 4,723 m (15,495 ft)
- Chimborazo, 6,268 m (20,564 ft)
- Corazón, 4,790 m (15,715 ft)
- Cotopaxi, 5,897 m (19,347 ft)
- El Altar, 5,320 m (17,454 ft)
- Illiniza, 5,248 m (17,218 ft)
- Pichincha, 4,784 m (15,696 ft)
- Quilotoa, 3,914 m (12,841 ft)
- Reventador, 3,562 m (11,686 ft)
- Sangay, 5,230 m (17,159 ft)
- Tungurahua, 5,023 m (16,480 ft)

=== Peru ===
- Alpamayo, 5,947 m (19,511 ft)
- Artesonraju, 6,025 m (19,767 ft)
- Carnicero, 5,960 m (19,554 ft)
- Chumpe, 6,106 m (20,033 ft)
- Coropuna, 6,377 m (20,922 ft)
- El Misti, 5,822 m (19,101 ft)
- El Toro, 5,830 m (19,127 ft)
- Huandoy, 6,395 m (20,981 ft)
- Huascarán, 6,768 m (22,205 ft)
- Jirishanca, 6,094 m (19,993 ft)
- Pumasillo, 5,991 m (19,656 ft)
- Rasac, 6,040 m (19,816 ft)
- Rondoy, 5,870 m (19,259 ft)
- Sarapo, 6,127 m (20,102 ft)
- Salcantay, 6,271 m (20,574 ft)
- Seria Norte, 5,860 m (19,226 ft)
- Siula Grande, 6,344 m (20,814 ft)
- Huaytapallana, 5,557 m (18,232 ft)
- Yerupaja, 6,635 m (21,768 ft)
- Yerupaja Chico, 6,089 m (19,977 ft)

=== Venezuela ===
- Pico Bolívar, 4,978 m (16,332 ft)
- Pico Humboldt, 4,940 m (16,207 ft)
- Pico Bonpland, 4,880 m (16,010 ft)
- Pico La Concha, 4,920 m (16,142 ft)
- Pico Piedras Blancas, 4,740 m (15,551 ft)
- Pico El Águila, 4,180 m (13,714 ft)
- Pico El Toro 4,729 m (15,515 ft)
- Pico El León 4,740 m (15,551 ft)
- Pico Mucuñuque 4,609 m (15,121 ft)
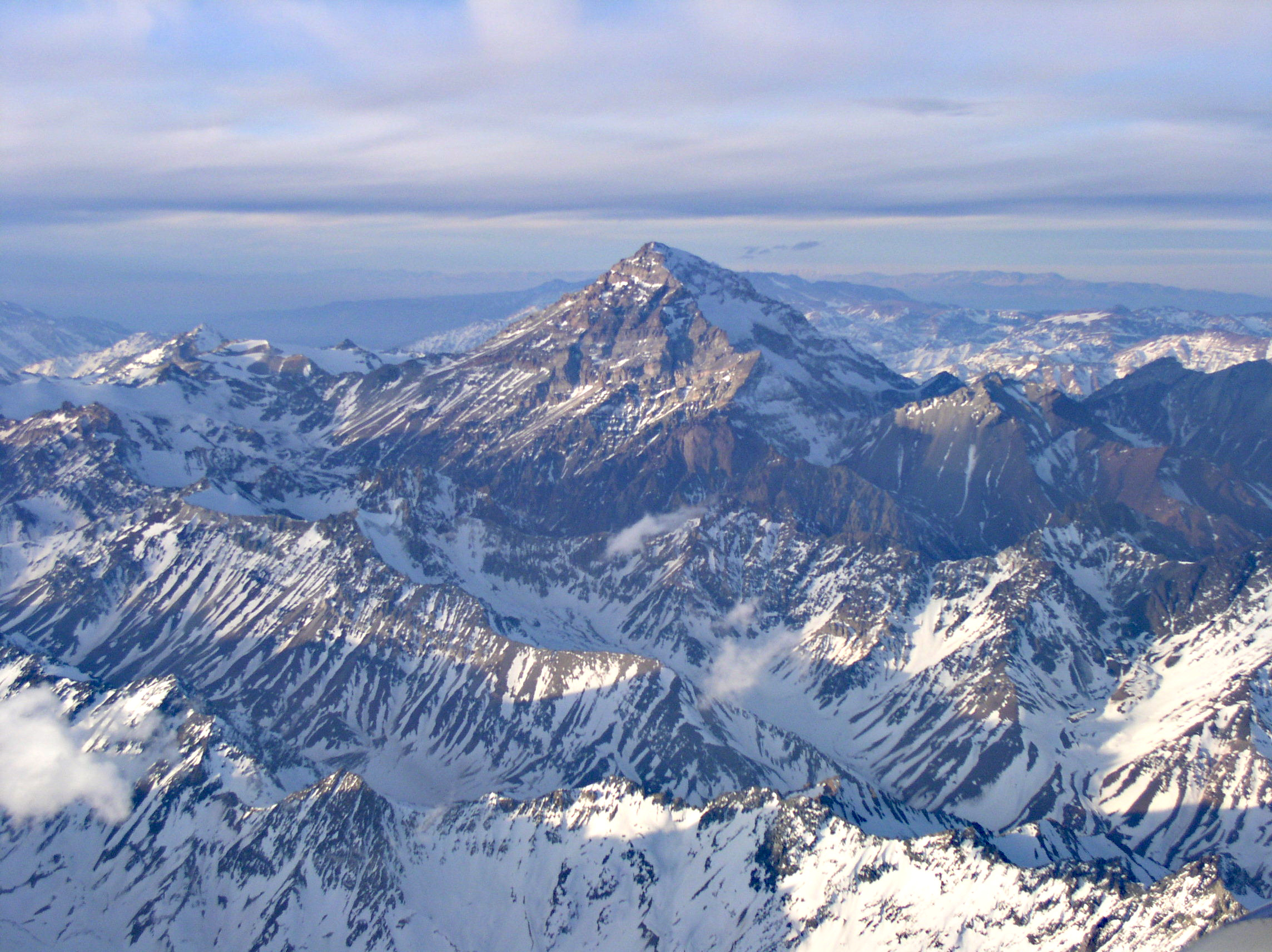
Aconcagua, Argentina, the highest mountain in the Americas

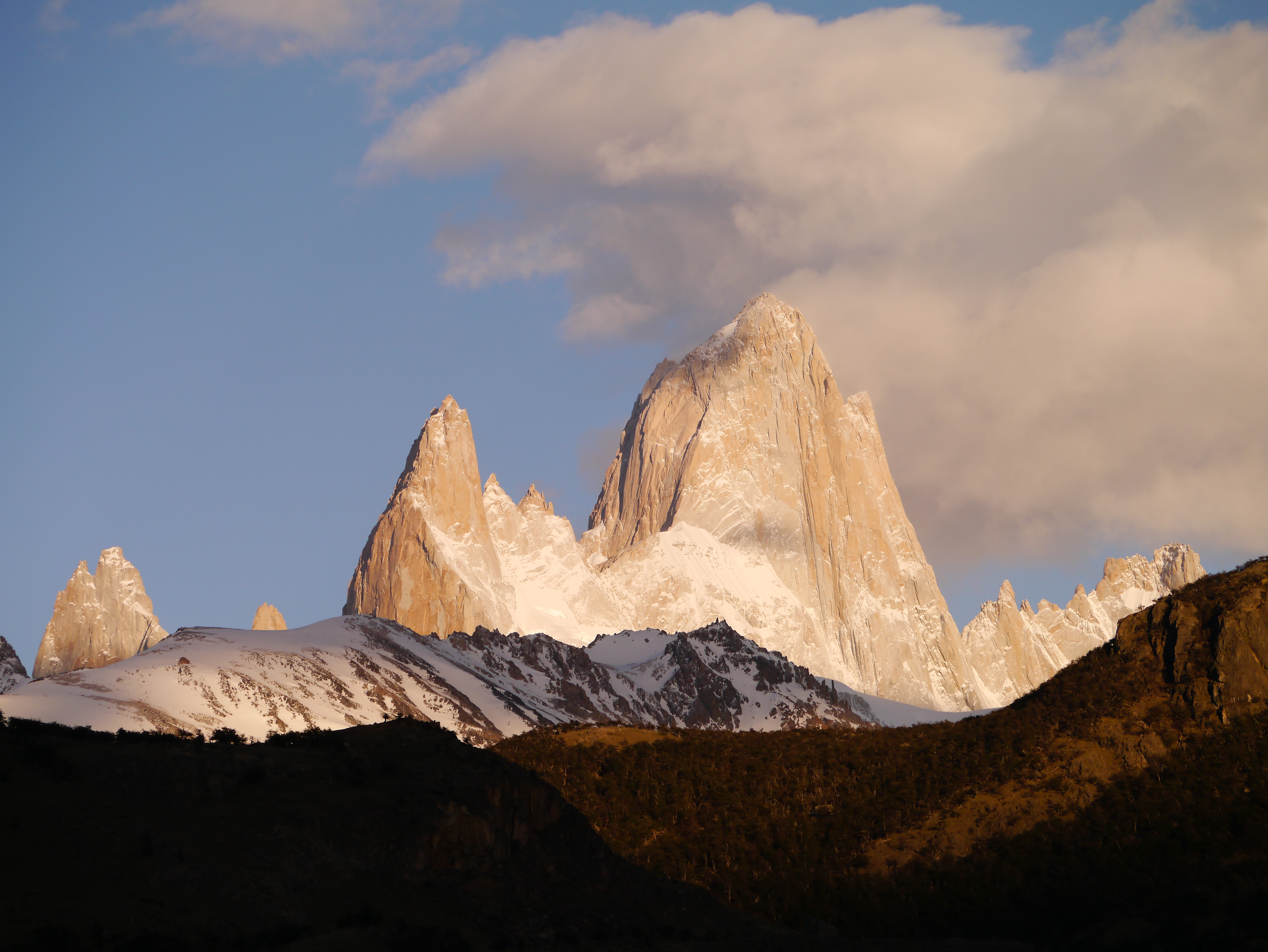
Fitz Roy in the Patagonia region between Argentina and Chile

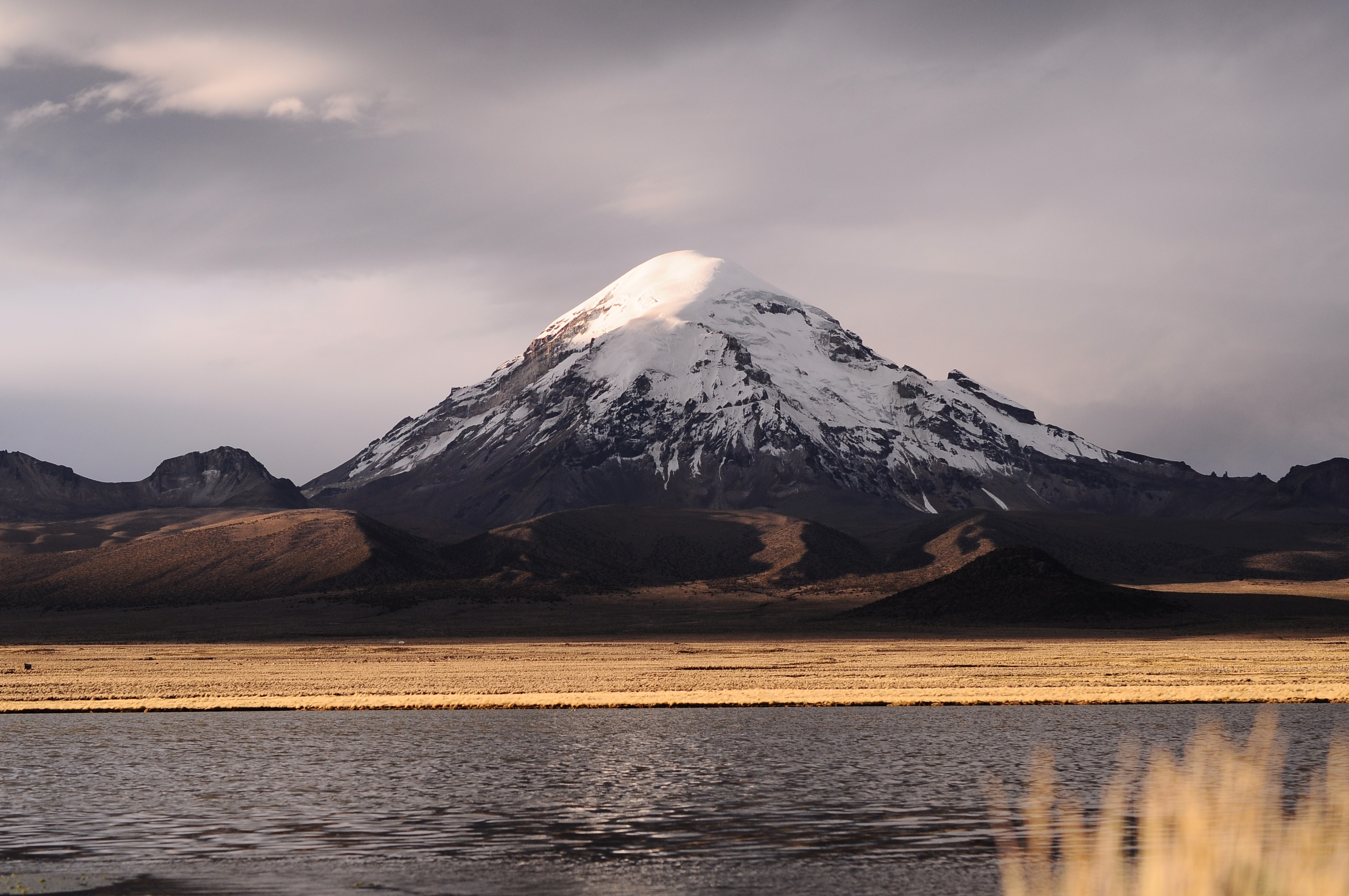
Sajama, Bolivia

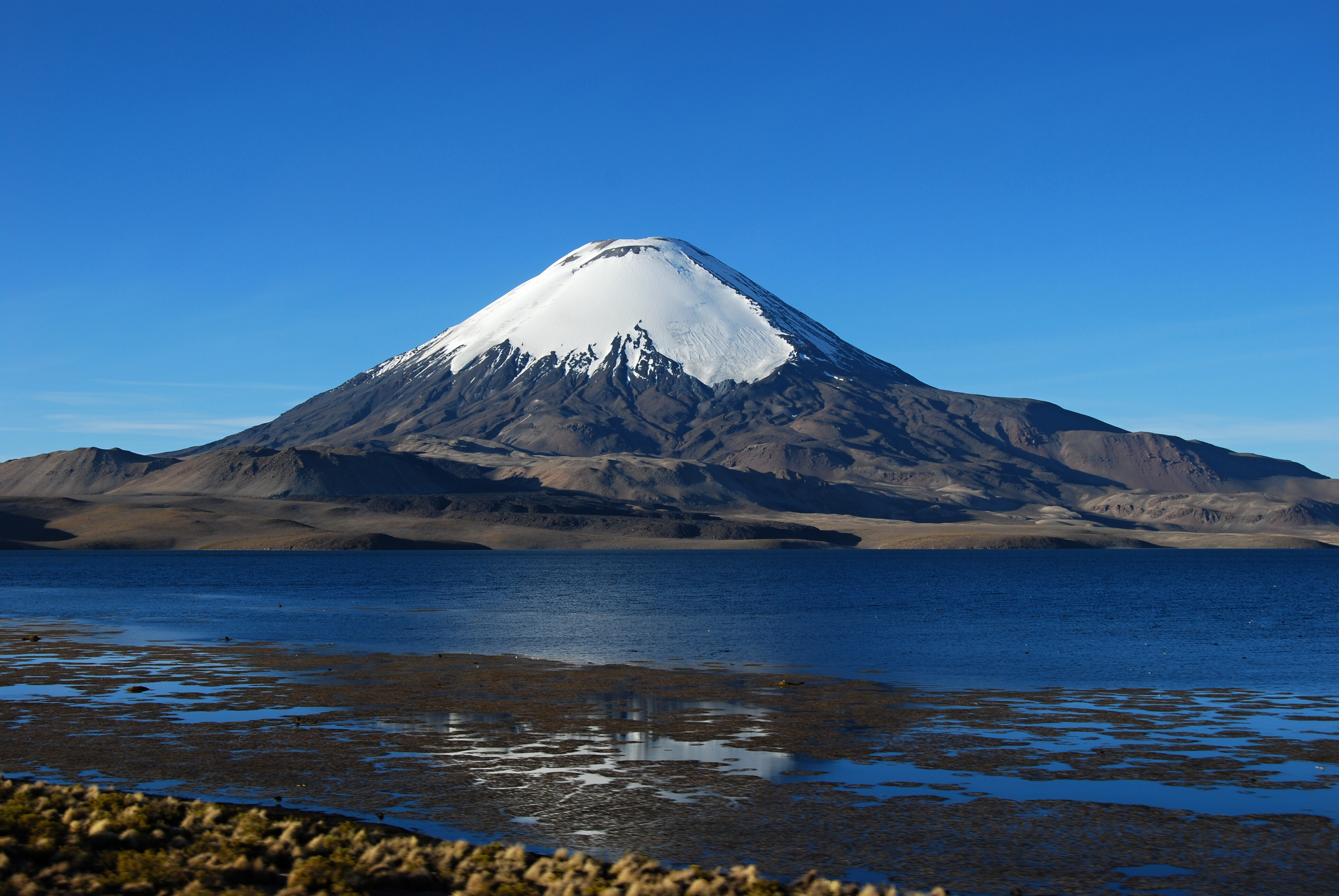
Parinacota, Bolivia/Chile

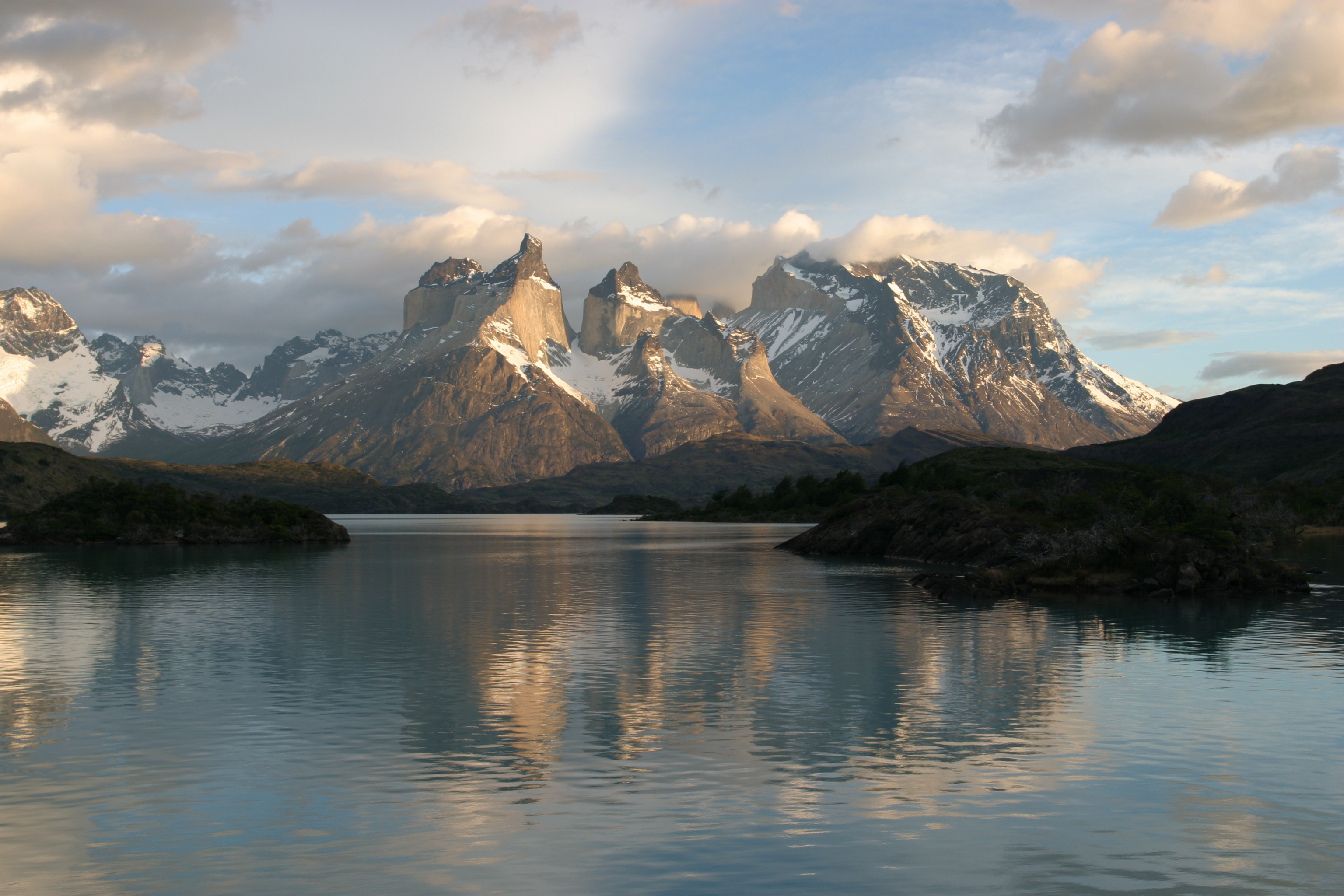
View of Cuernos del Paine in Torres del Paine National Park, Chile

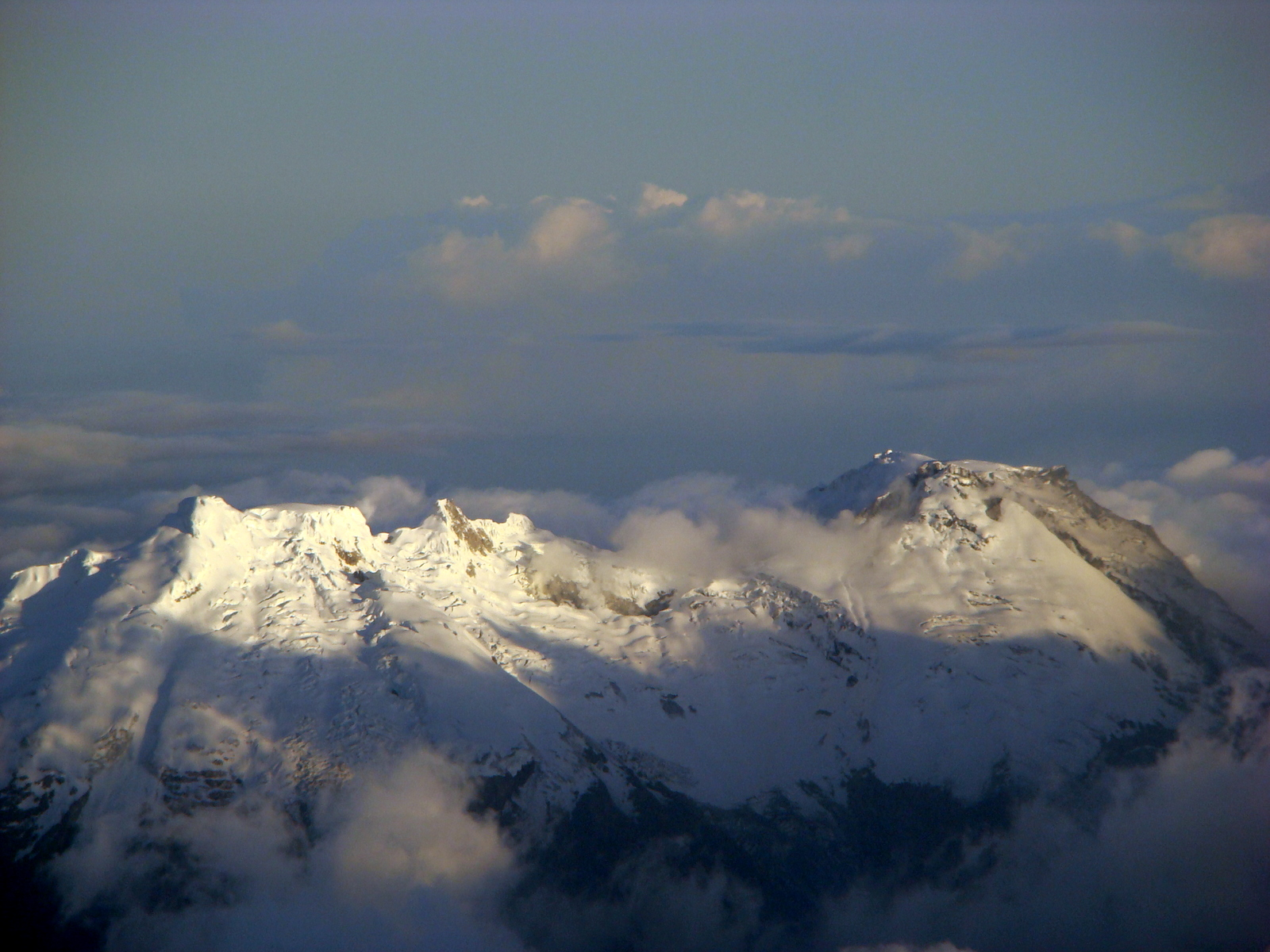
Nevado del Huila, Colombia

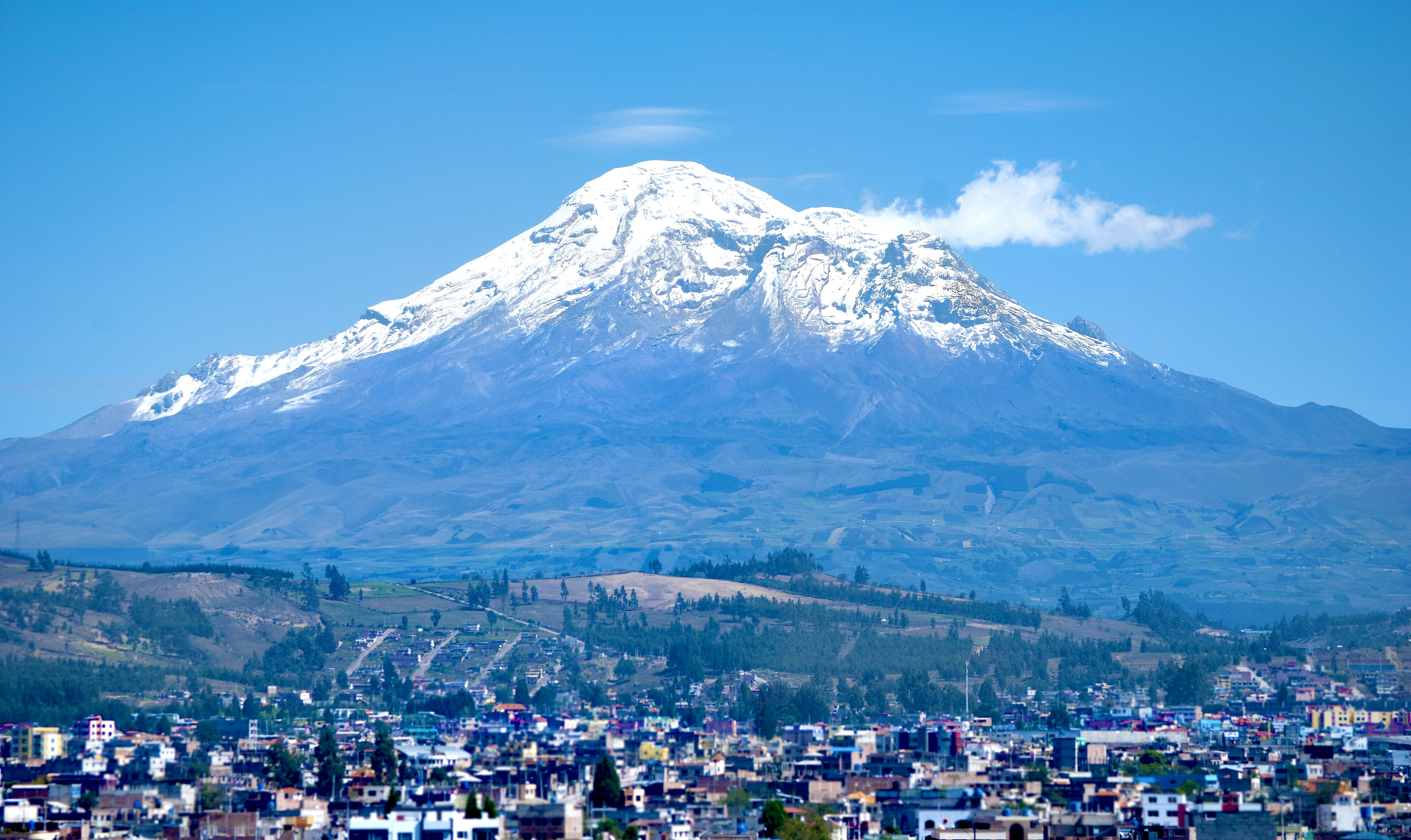
Chimborazo near Riobamba, Ecuador

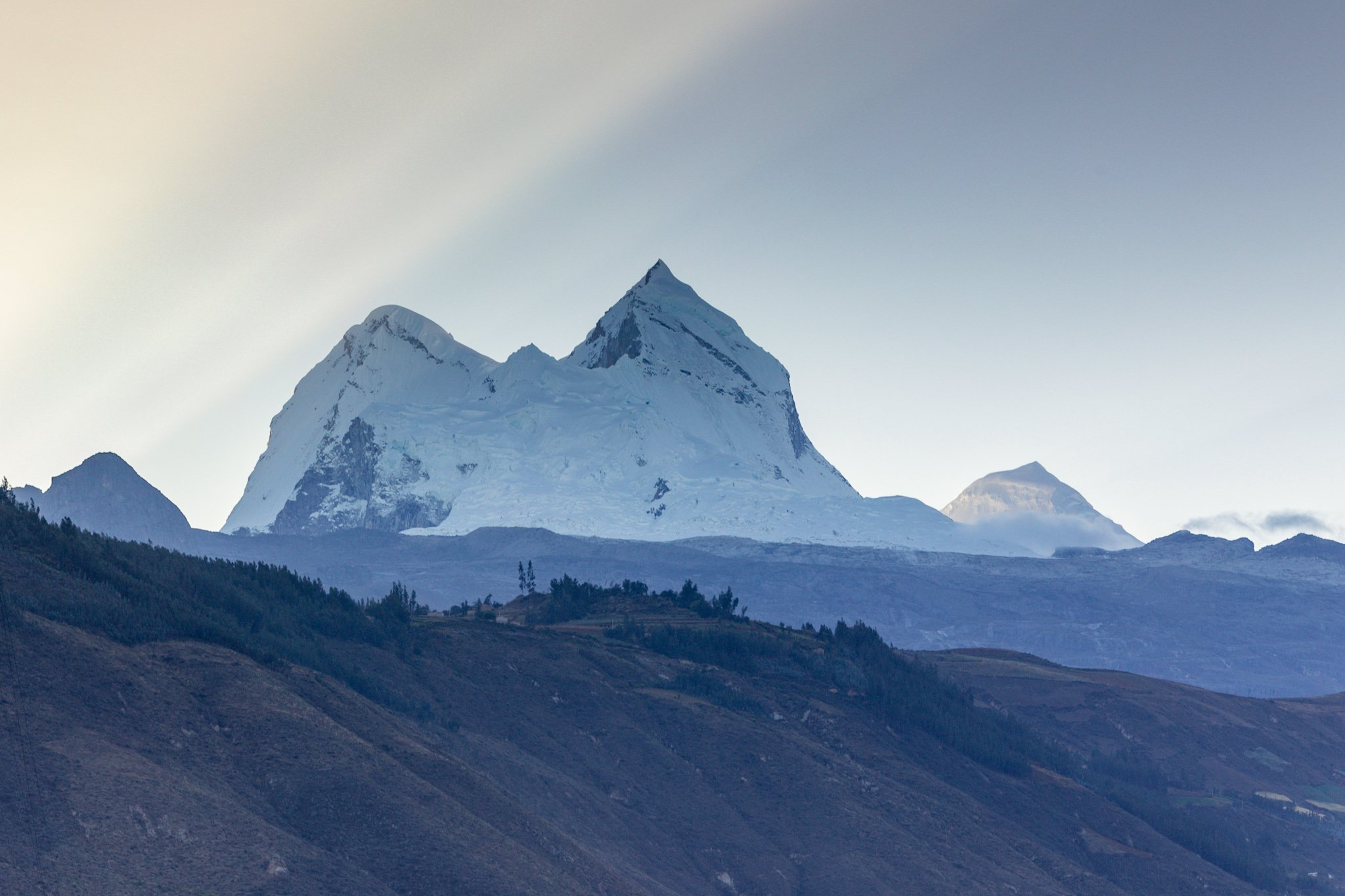
Huandoy, Peru

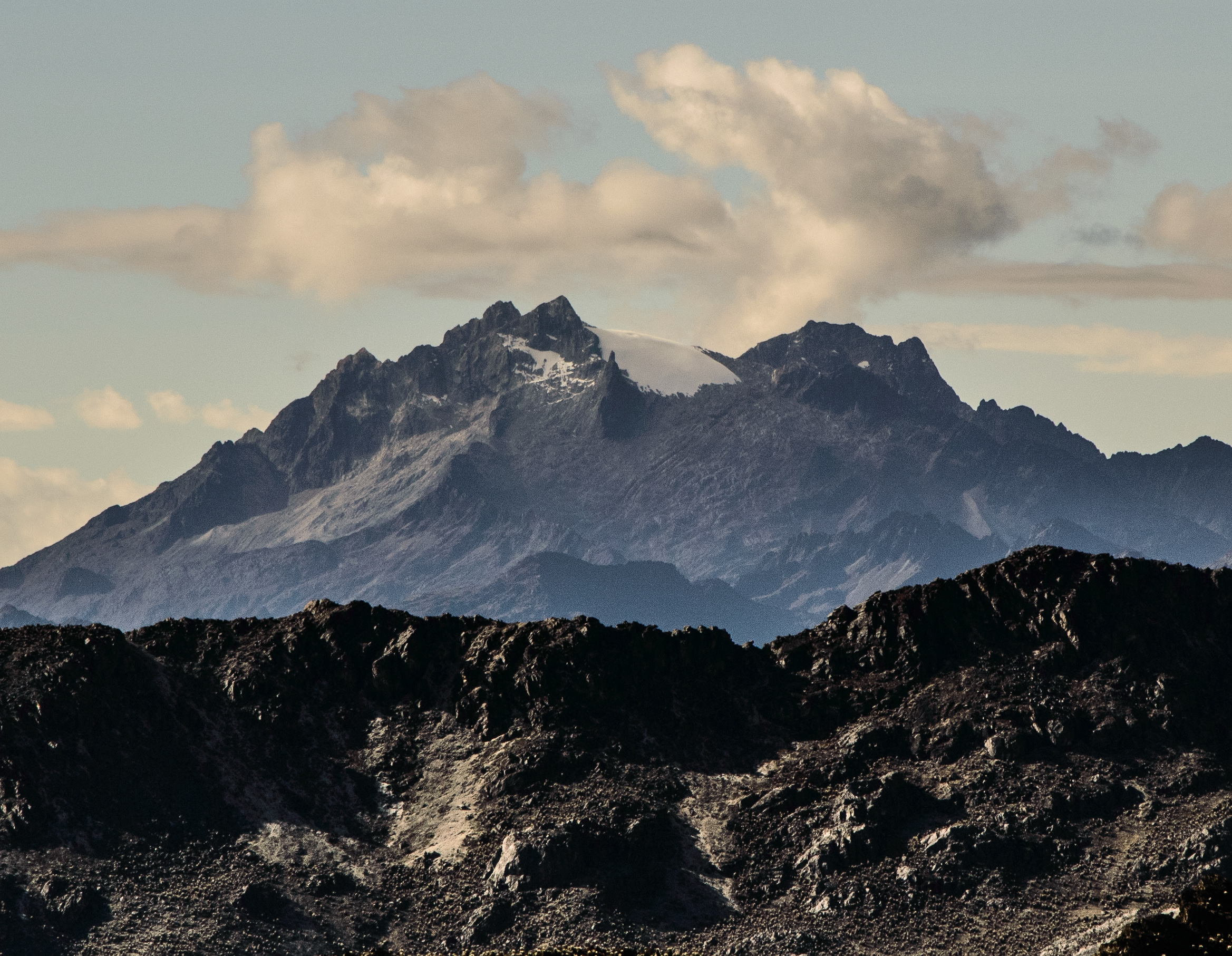
Pico Humboldt, Venezuela

== See also ==
- Andean Geology—a scientific journal
- Andesite line
- Apu (god)
- Mountain passes of the Andes
- List of mountain ranges
- Sutter Buttes

== Bibliography ==
- Biggar, John (2005). The Andes: A Guide for Climbers (3 ed.). Scotland: Andes Publishing. ISBN 978-0-9536087-2-0.
- Darack, Ed (2001). Wild Winds: Adventures in the Highest Andes. Cordee / DPP. ISBN 978-1-884980-81-7.
