= Carnicero =

Carnicero is an occupational surname literally meaning butcher, slaughterer in Spanish. Notable people with the surname include:

- Antonio Carnicero, Spanish painter
- Alejandro Carnicero, Spanish sculptor
