= Sierra Nevada National Park (Venezuela) =

Venezuelan National Park

- IUCN category II (national park)
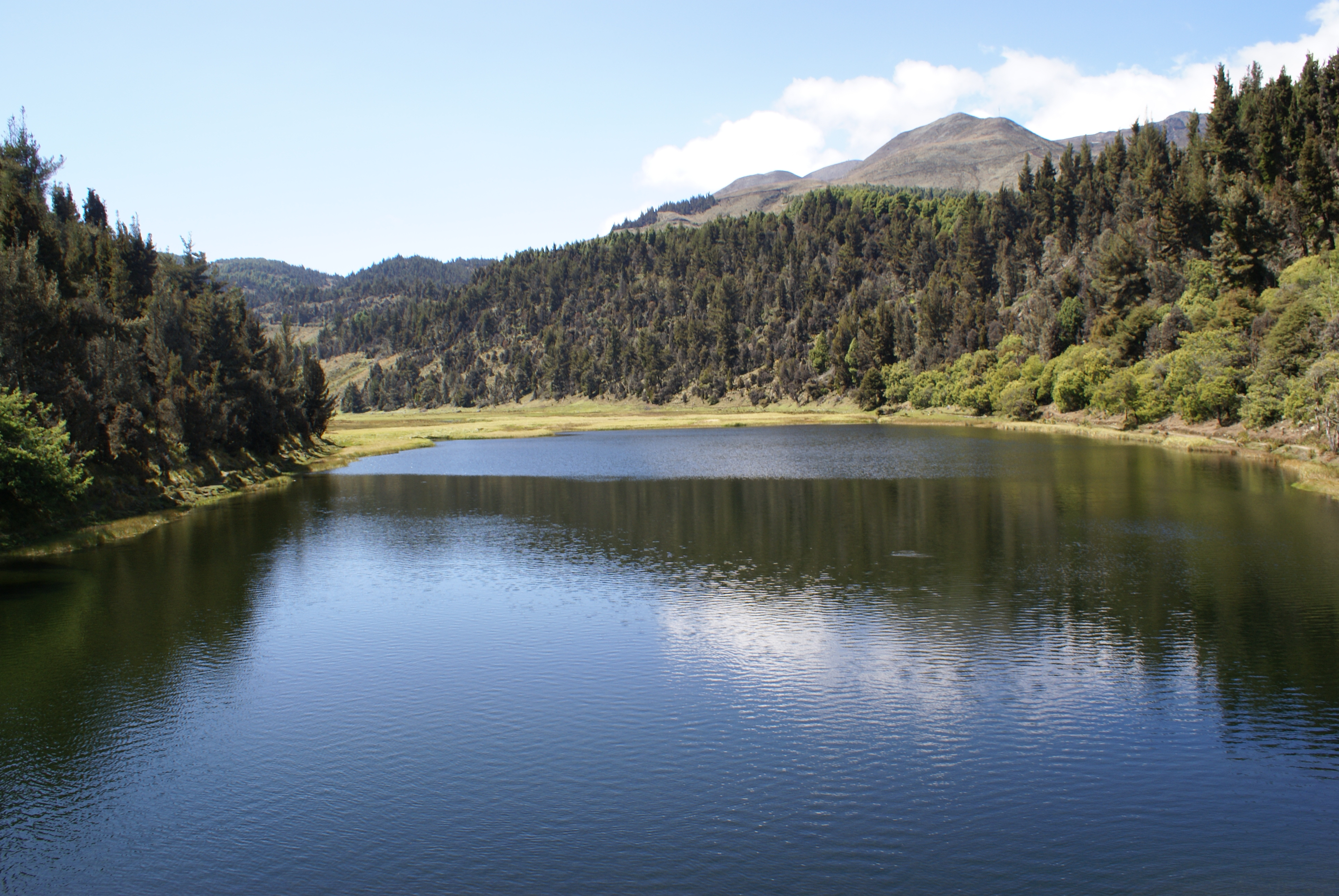
- Victoria Lagoon

- Location within Venezuela
- Location: Venezuelan Andes
- Nearest city: Mérida
- Coordinates: 8°34′N 70°42′W
- Area: 276,446 ha (683,110 acres)
- Established: 2 May 1952
- Governing body: Instituto Nacional de Parques(INPARQUES); National Park Institute

The Sierra Nevada National Park (SNNP) is a National Park of Venezuela located between the states of Mérida and Barinas in western Venezuela. It was created on May 2, 1952, by decree of President Germán Suárez Flamerich in an attempt to protect the Sierra Nevada de Mérida in the Andes.

It was declared a national park 15 years after the creation of Henri Pittier National Park, which was the first Venezuelan national park to be created.

The park includes many of the tallest mountains in the Venezuelan Andes, including Pico Bolívar, the highest peak in Venezuela at 4,978 m (16,332 ft).

== History ==
The idea to create the Sierra Nevada Park originated in the Escuela de Ingeniería Forestal in 1948. The University of the Andes appointed a commission to create a preliminary study. This study was later presented to national authorities to justify the creation of the park.

On May 2, 1952, the Governing Board, chaired by Germán Suárez Flamerich, signed a decree which created the Sierra Nevada National Park.

Initially, the park covered an area of 190,000 hectares. However, on August 14, 1985, President Jaime Lusinchi expanded the park, adding 86,446 hectares to form a total area of 276,446 hectares.

== Geography ==
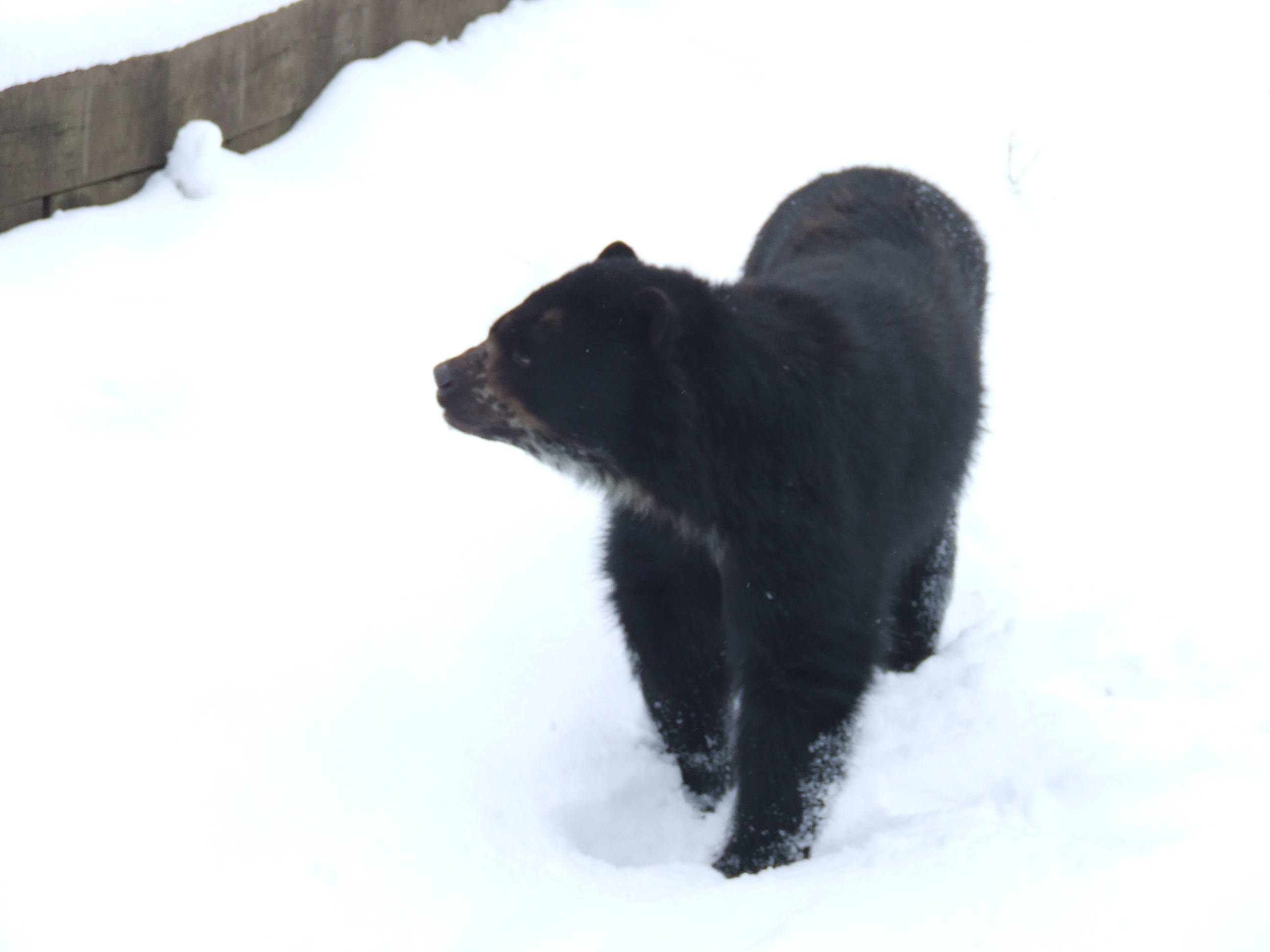
The spectacled bear, an endangered species

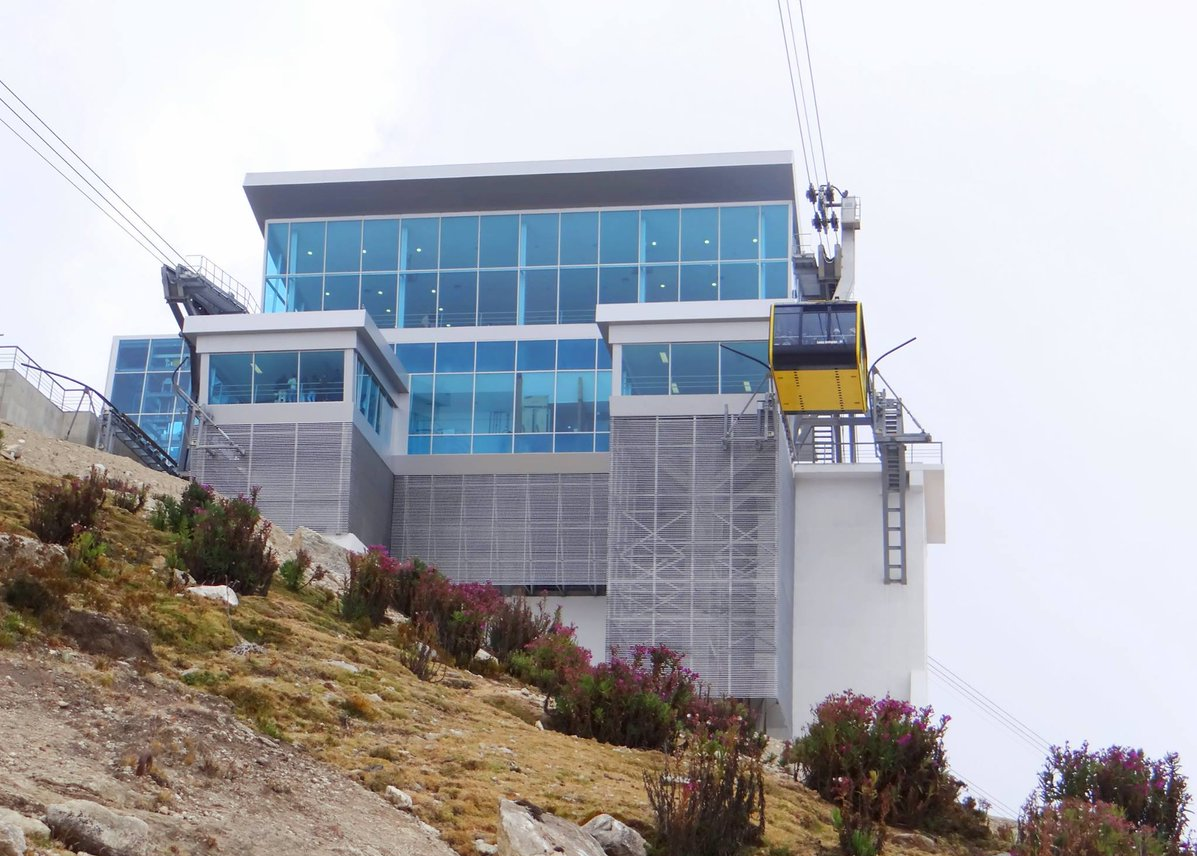
The New Mérida cable car cabin, the highest cable car and tour around the world

The park encompasses parts of six municipalities of the states of Mérida and three of the Barinas state. Its total area is 276,446 hectares, of which 185,886 ha (67.2%) belong to the state of Mérida, while the remaining 90,560 ha (32.8%) belong to the state of Barinas.

The park includes the Sierra Nevada de Mérida and Sierra de Santo Domingo, one of the three branches of the Cordillera de Mérida in the central Andes of Venezuela. The area is rugged and contains the main peaks of the country: Pico Bolívar (4,978 m), Pico Humboldt (4,942 m), Pico La Concha (4,922 m), Pico Bonpland (4,883 m), and Pico Espejo (4,609 m).

The Sierra Nevada is separated from the Sierra La Culata, another Cordilleran massif of the Andean mountain range, by the Chama River valley to the northwest and by the Santo Domingo River valley, Kettle Mucubají, and José Antonio Páez dam to the northeast. In the southwest, the boundary of the park forms the valley of the Nuestra Señora river, the left bank tributary of the Chama River, downstream from the city of Ejido. The park is in two major mountain ranges: the Sierra Nevada de Mérida and the Sierra de Santo Domingo, which are characterized by high peaks, glacial valleys, and river valleys.

The park is in two major mountain ranges: the Sierra Nevada de Mérida and the Sierra de Santo Domingo, which are characterized by high peaks, glacial valleys, and river valleys.

The main rivers are the Chama, Albarregas, and Mucujún flowing into Lake Maracaibo. Meanwhile, in the Orinoco basin, the main ones are the Caparo, the Santo Domingo, and the Cajurí that flows into the Uribante. In the park are also thirteen watersheds and ten lakes of glacial origin, whose global warming effects have been reduced; some of them are: Mucubají, La Negra, La Verde, and Los Anteojos.

The vegetation of the park is representative of the Andean cloud forests, mostly trees, with well-developed undergrowth layers and numerous epiphytes and endemic species. At altitudes above 3,000 m, typical moorland vegetation develops, consisting of a large number of species of Espeletia. It also presents xerophytic scrub vegetation in the drier areas of the River Basin Nuestra Señora. In Barinas, the vegetation is predominantly forest, with trees up to 25 m (82 ft) height.

=== Climate ===
The Sierra Nevada experiences two distinct climatic periods annually. The wet season, characterized by maximum rainfall, spans from May to October. Conversely, the dry season, marked by minimal rainfall, occurs between December and March. Precipitation in the region is not limited to rain; snowfall is also a common occurrence, especially on the highest peaks. Snowfalls are frequent from July to September and become sporadic throughout the remainder of the year.

The park's elevation results in a significant temperature range. Average annual temperatures vary from 26 °C (79 °F) in the lower elevations (around 400 meters above sea level) to -5 °C (23 °F) in the higher elevations (above 4900 meters above sea level).

Fauna

== Fauna ==
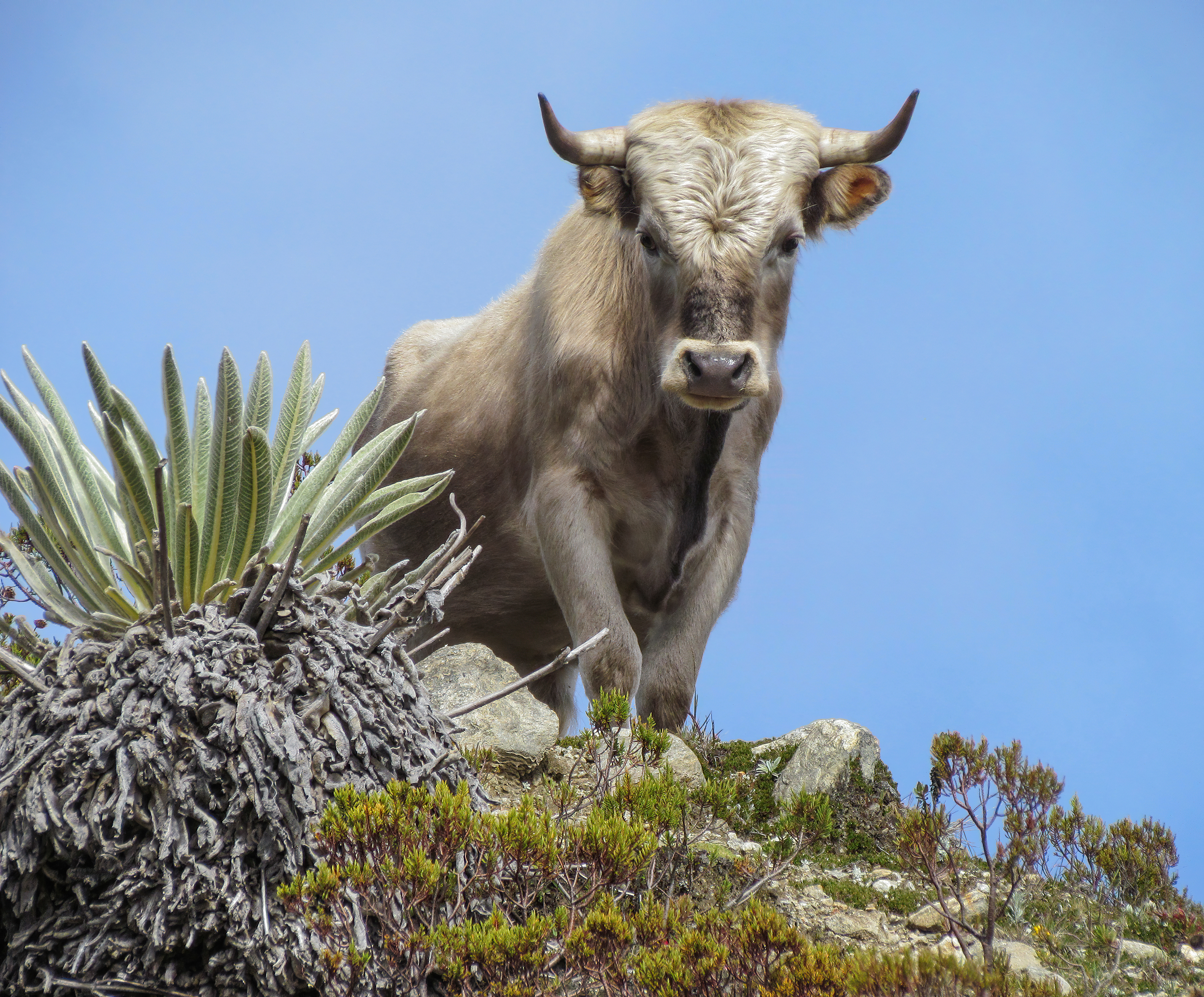
Feral cattle in the park

The diverse climate of the Sierra Nevada National Park has made it a refuge for a wide range of animal species. Notably, the park is home to the spectacled bear, the only species of the Ursidae family in the Andes and a species currently classified as endangered.

The Sierra Nevada hosts a variety of other wildlife species, including the white-tailed deer, helmeted curassow, puma, Andean coati, purported Andean leopard (though this might be a reference to pumas as there are no officially recognized species by the name of Andean leopard), jaguar, paca, and the moor rabbit. The park also contains populations of feral cattle and horses.

The avian population in the park is rich and diverse, featuring species such as the Andean guan, white-tailed quetzal, masked trogon, magpies, and the black-chested buzzard-eagle. The Andean condor, a larger bird species now facing the threat of extinction, is subject to restocking programs in Colombia to help preserve its numbers.

== Access ==
The Sierra Nevada National Park is accessible through several routes. The Mérida cable car is the most popular method for visitors to enter the park. Additionally, road access is available through the village of Tabay, specifically through the La Mucuy area. This road leads visitors into the park, offering a journey past several notable lagoons, including Coromoto, La Verde, and El Suero. The route encompasses the periphery of significant peaks such as Pico Humboldt and La Concha. It continues towards the south to Pico Bolívar and extends southeast to Pico Espejo.

== Gallery ==
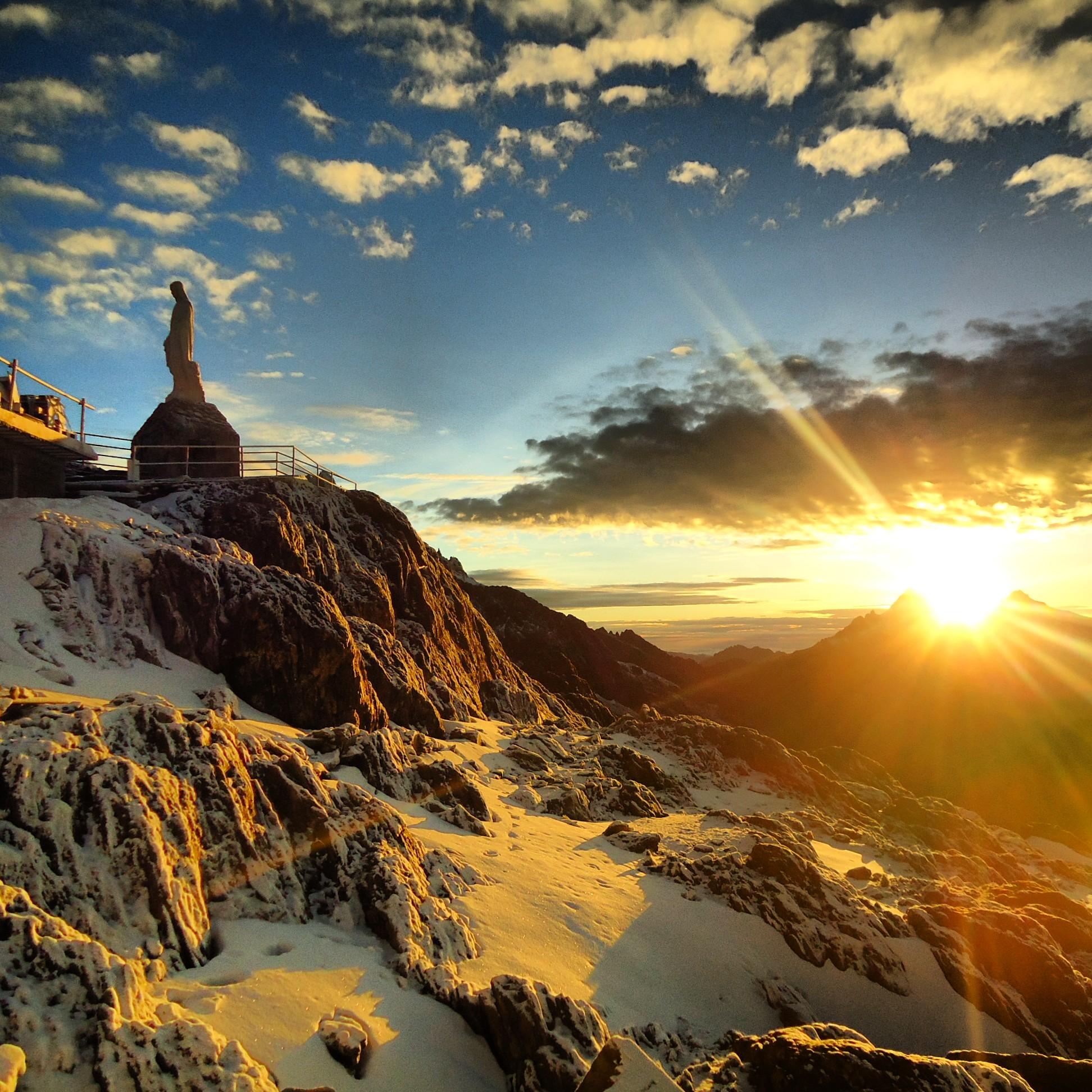
Virgin of the Snows

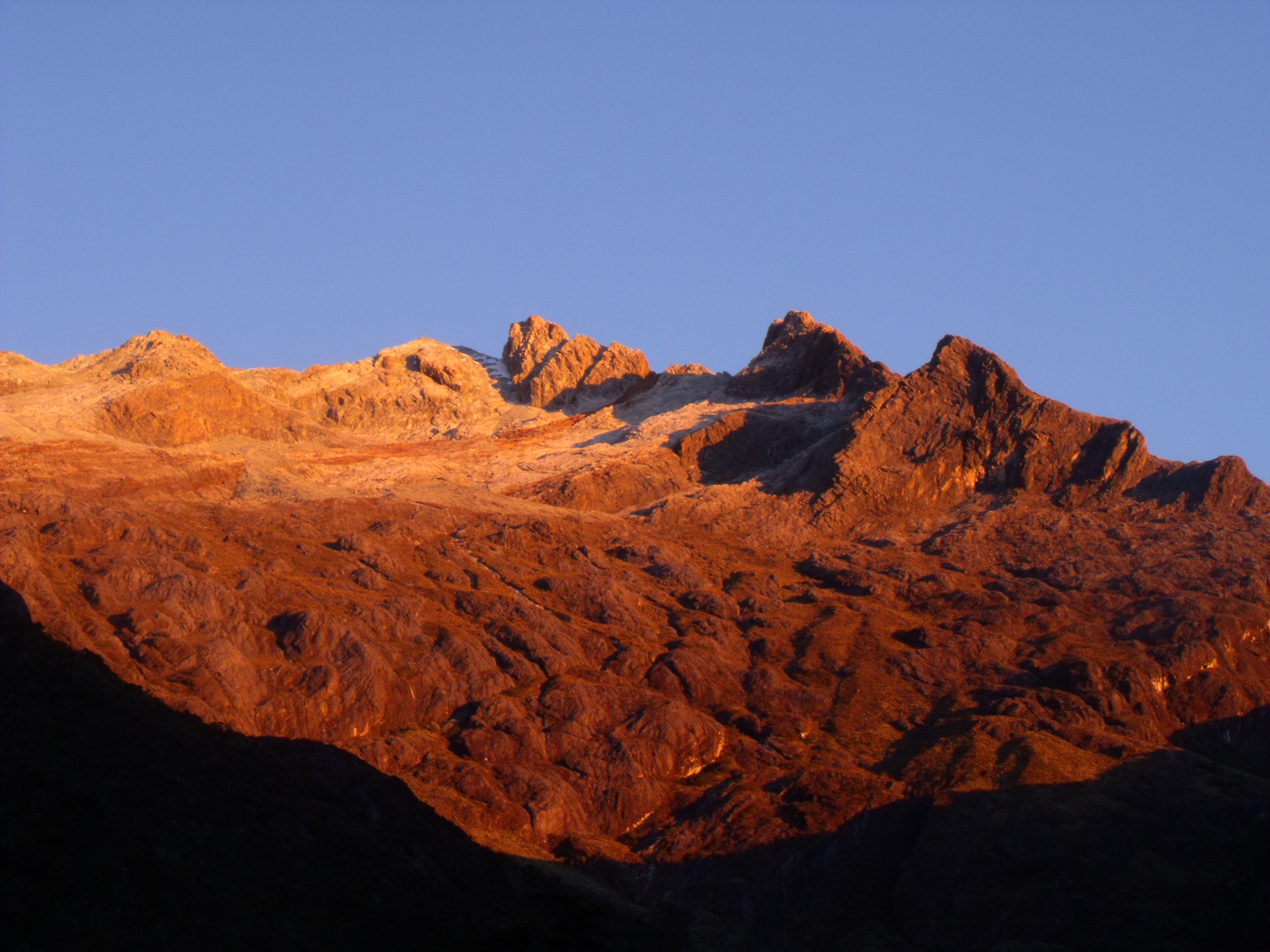
Humboldt Peak

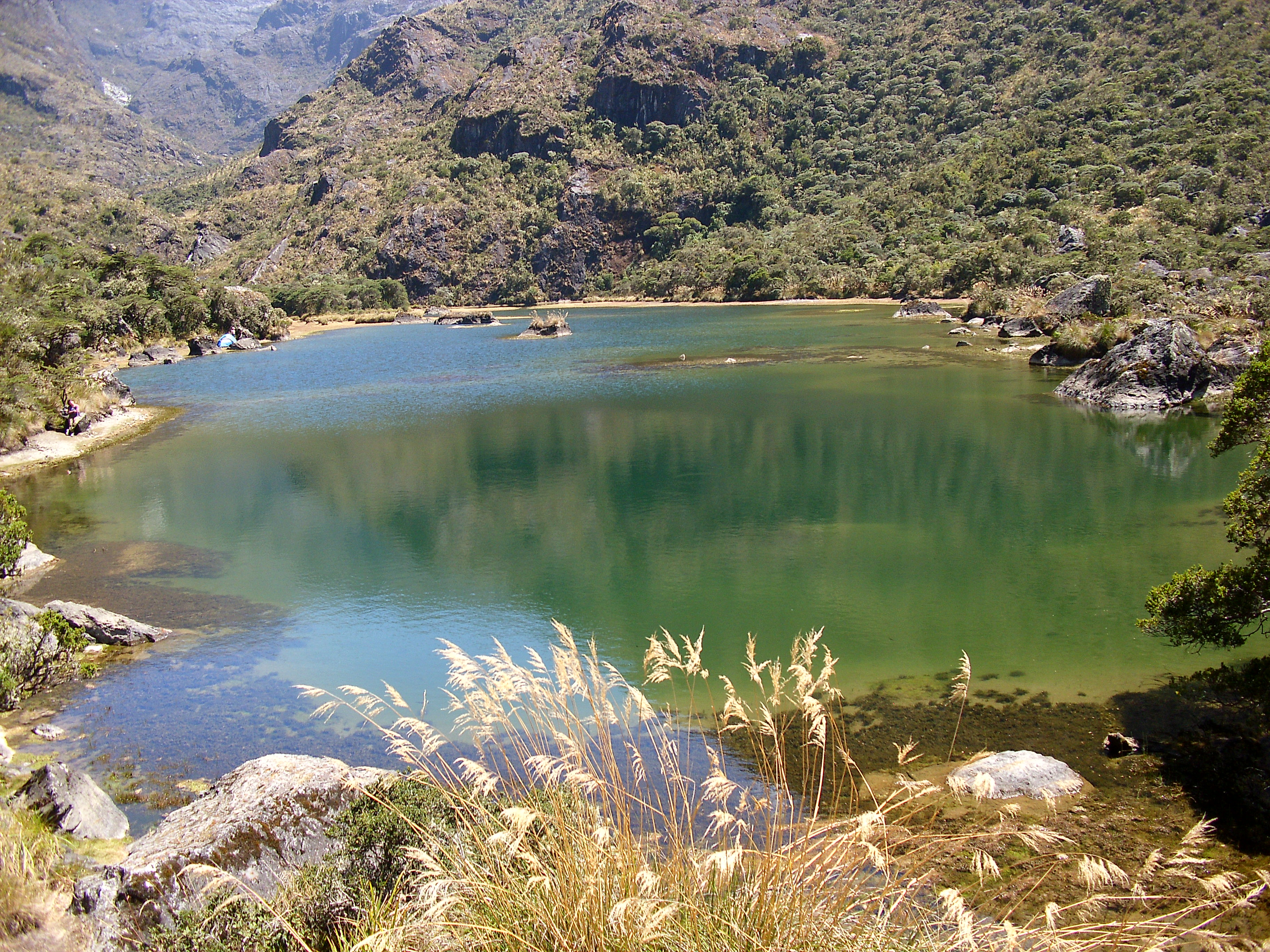
Coromoto Lagoon

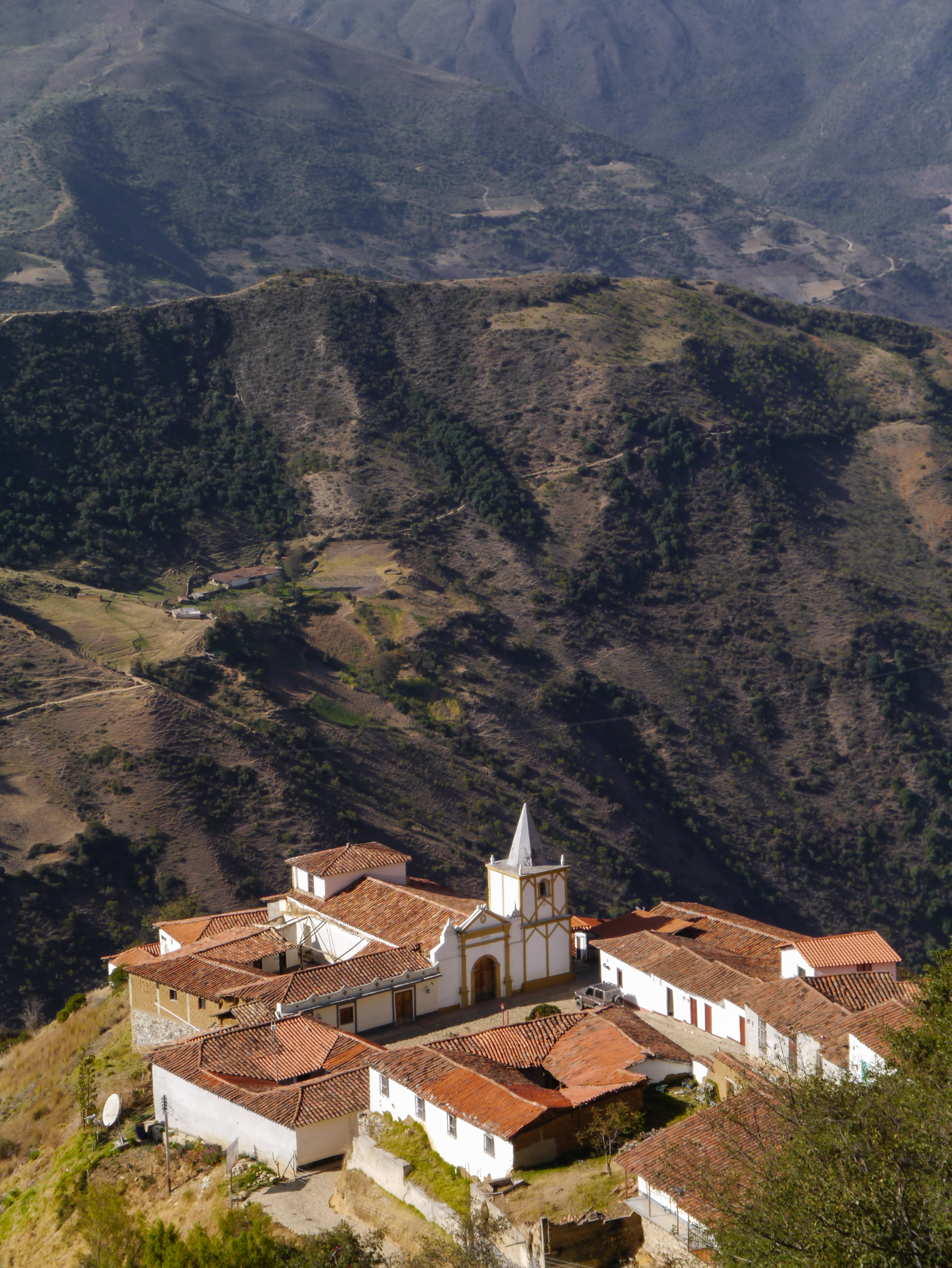
Los Nevados Village

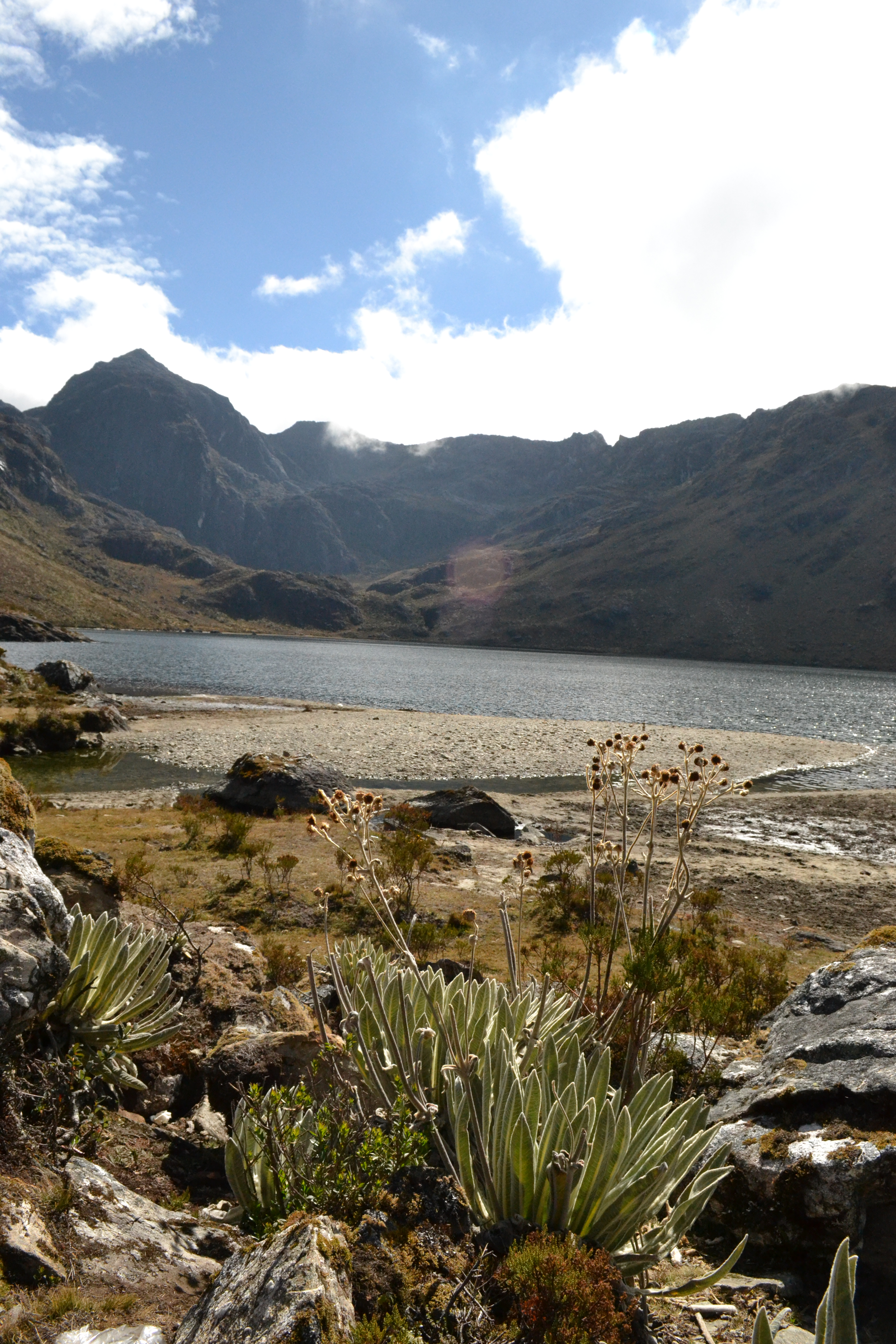
Santo Cristo Lagoon (Holy Christ Lagoon)

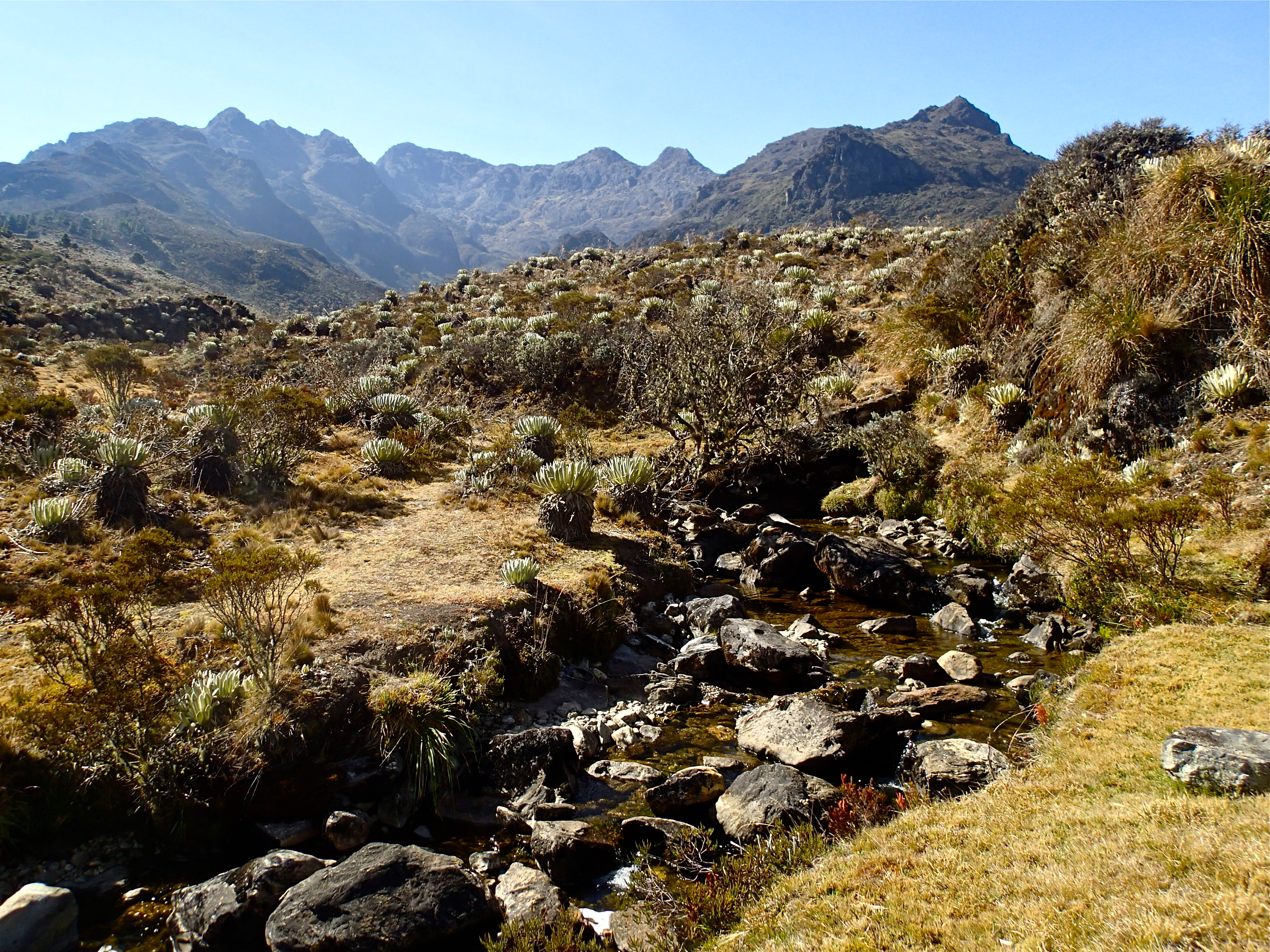
Mucubaji river

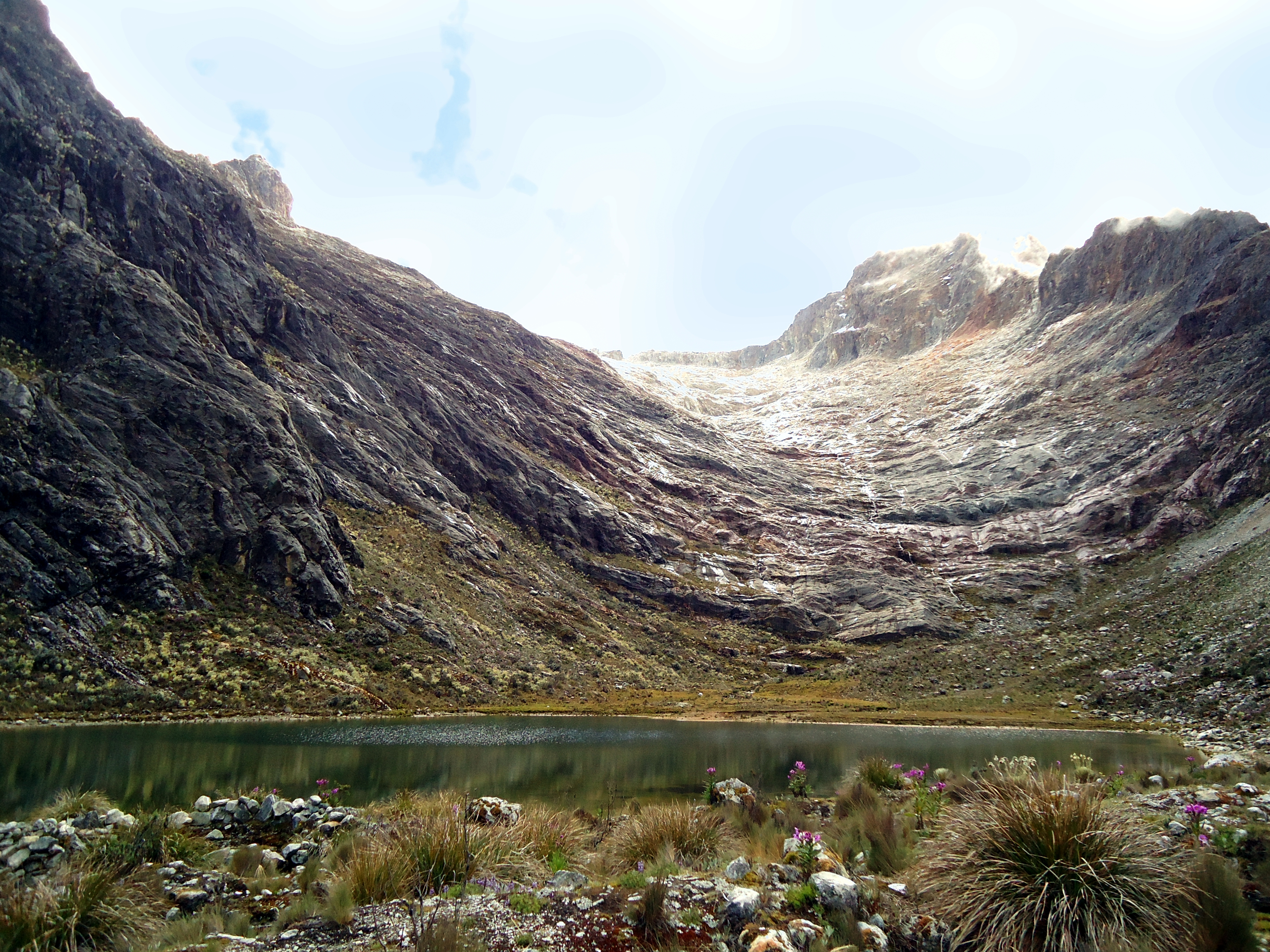
El Suero Lagoon

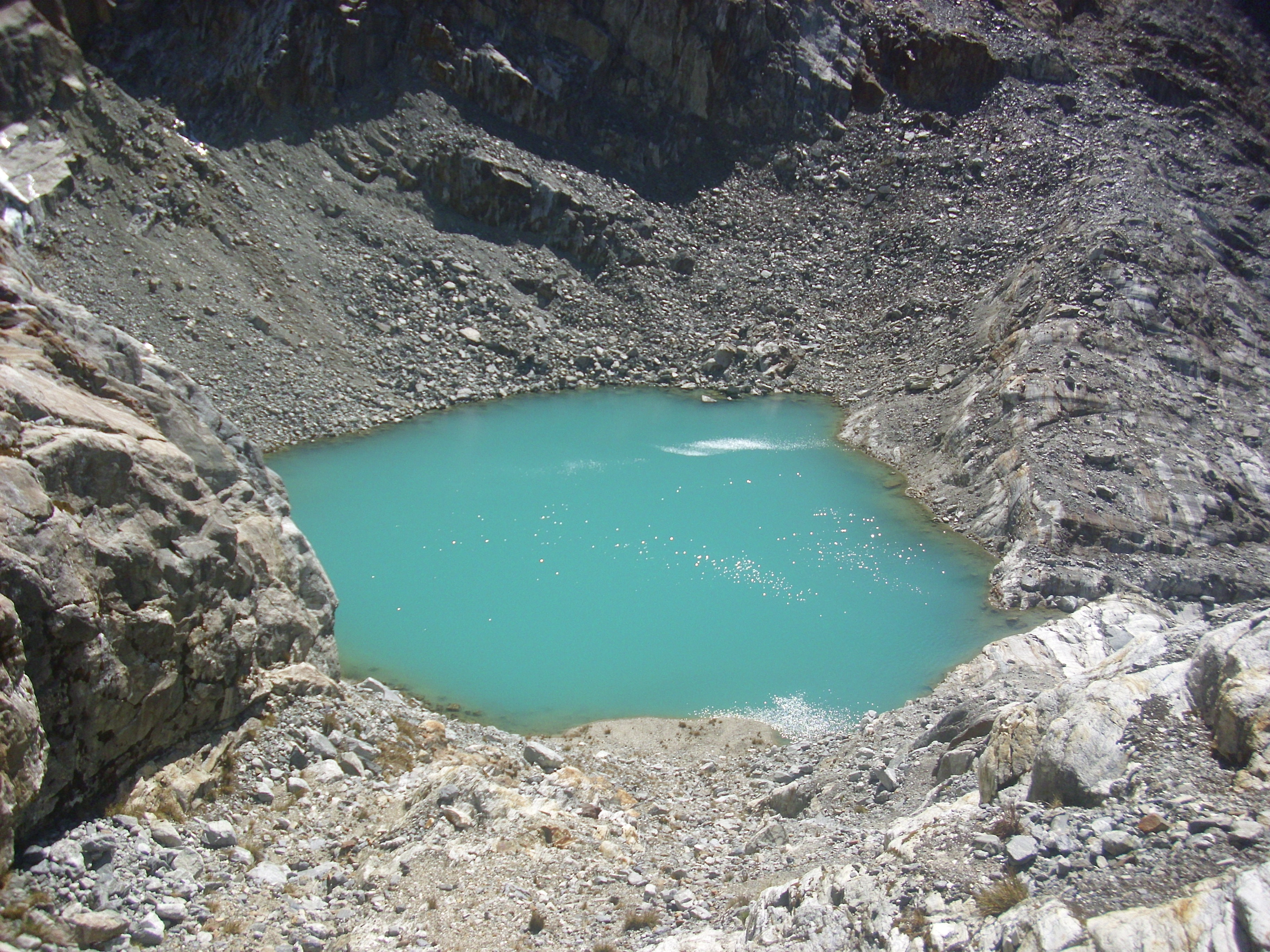
Los Hielitos Lagoon, Bondpland Peak

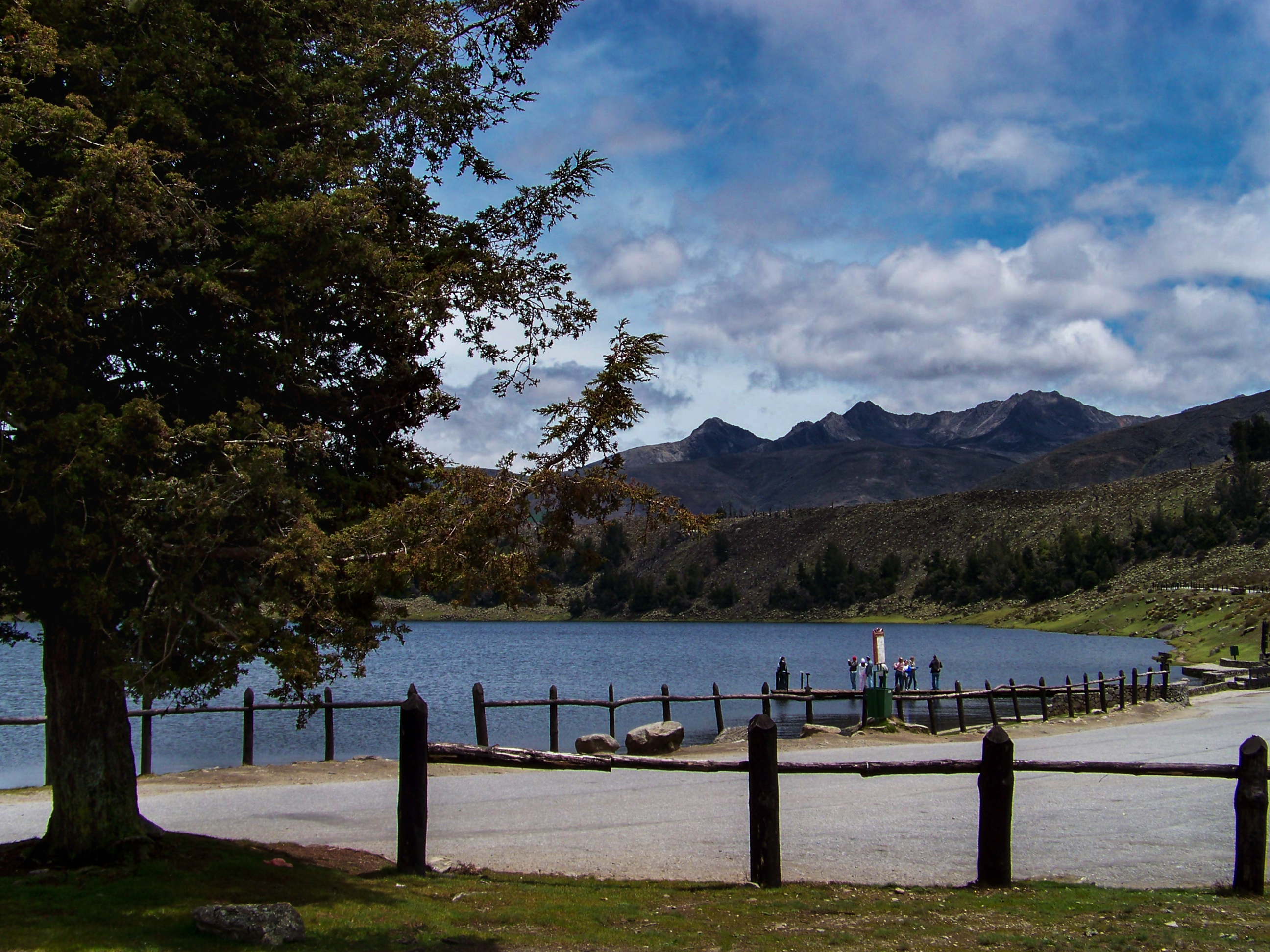
Mucubaji Lagoon

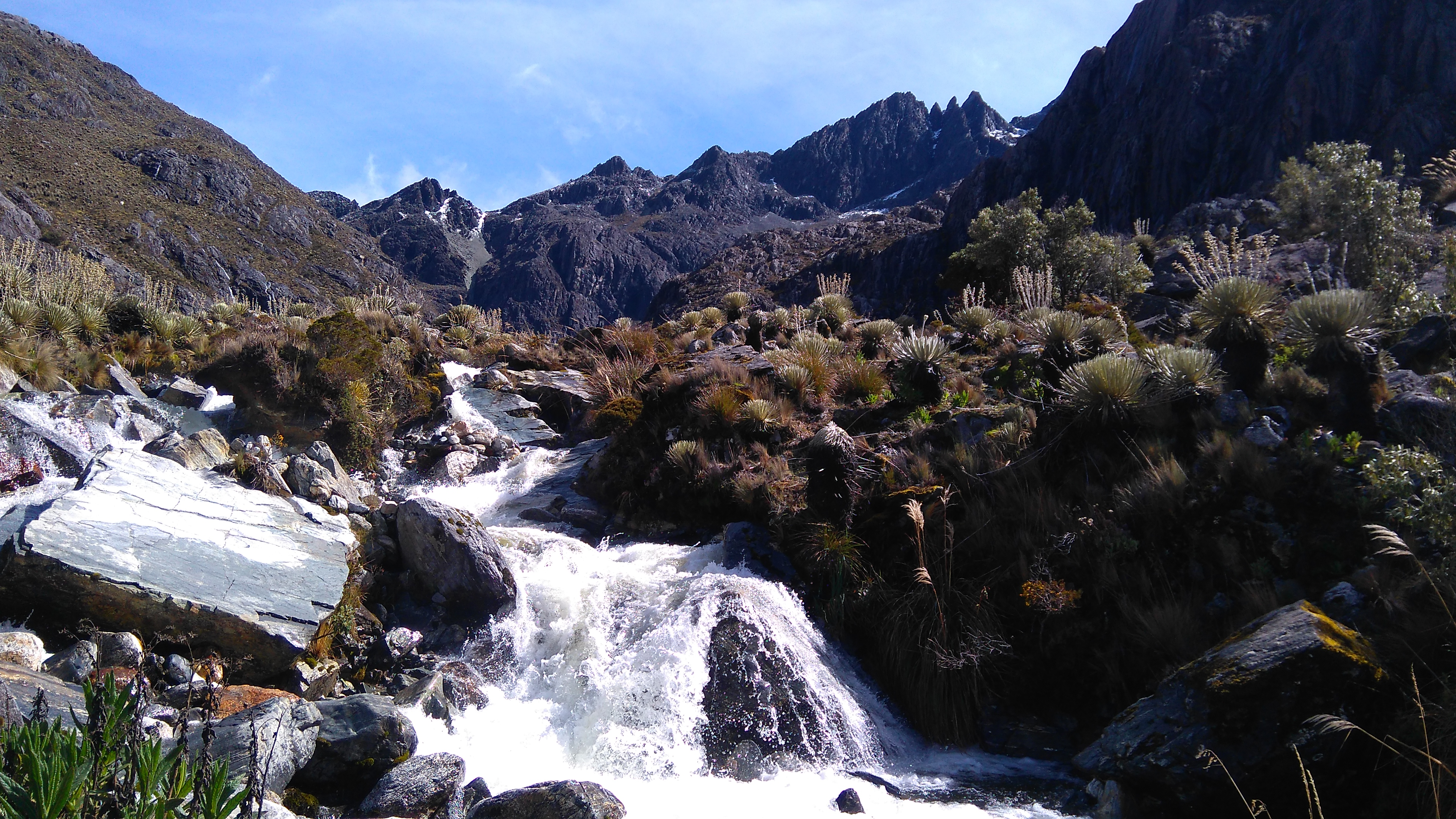
Waterfall at the base of Humboldt Peak

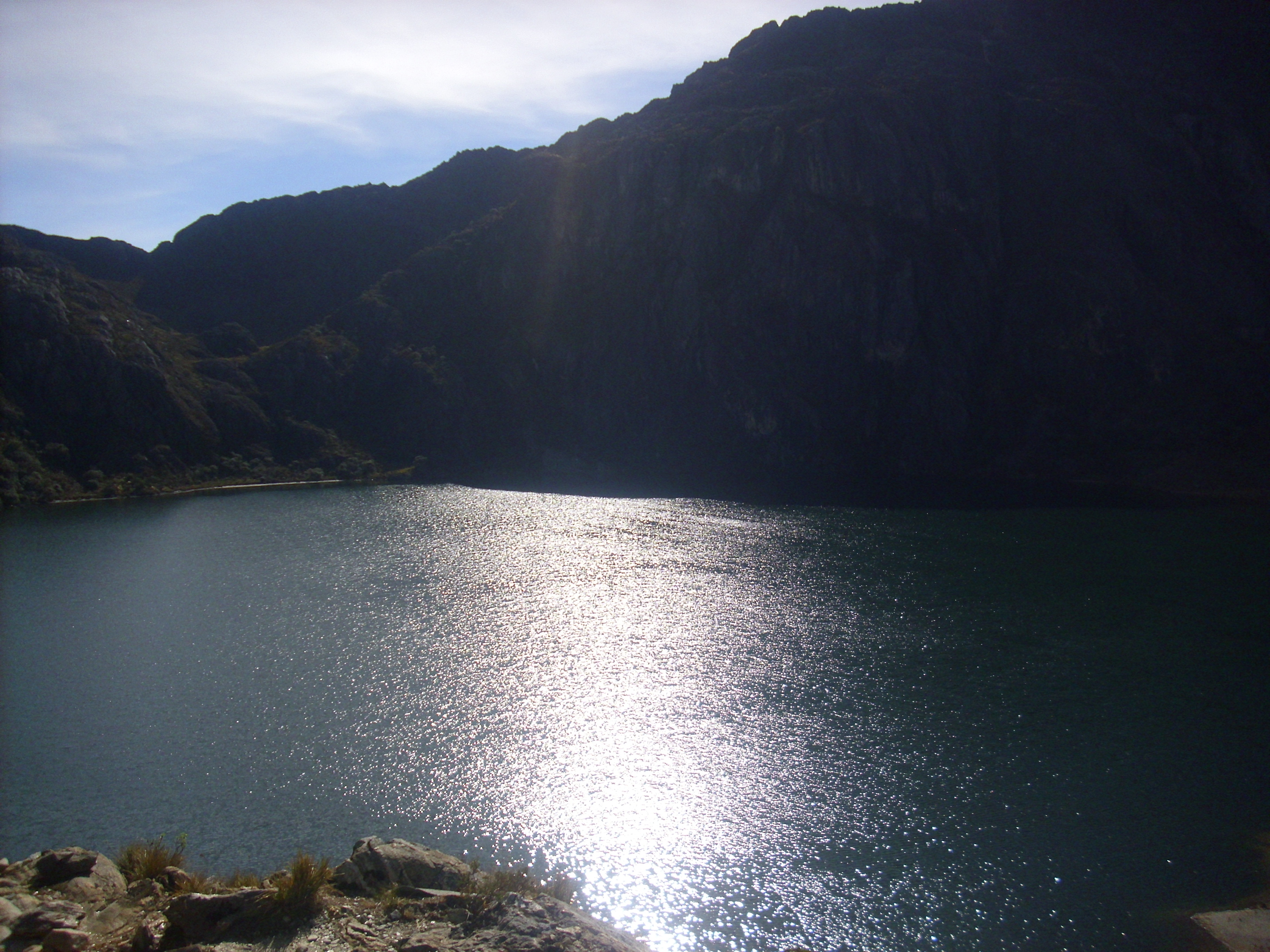
Verde Lagoon

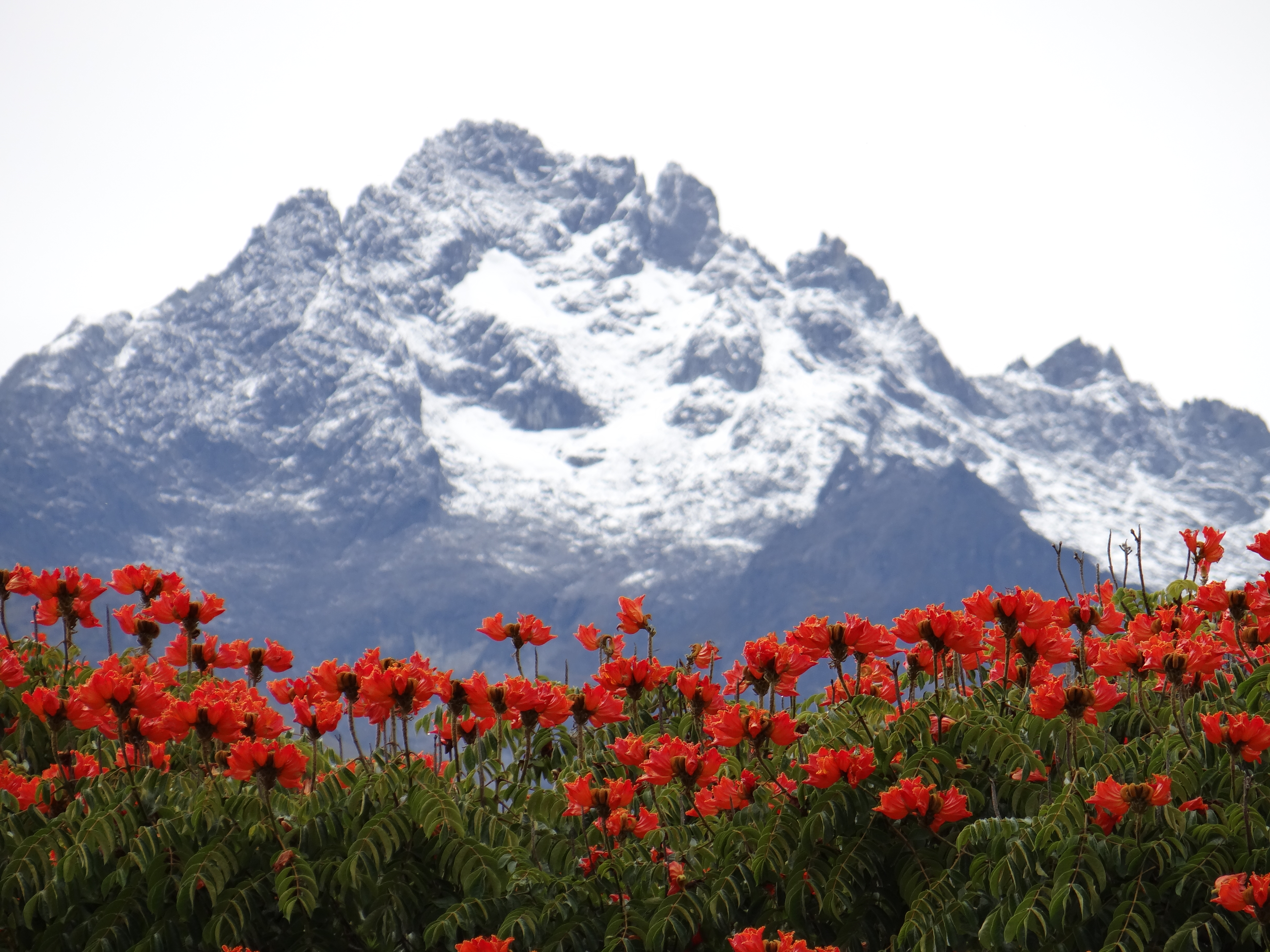
Bolívar Peak

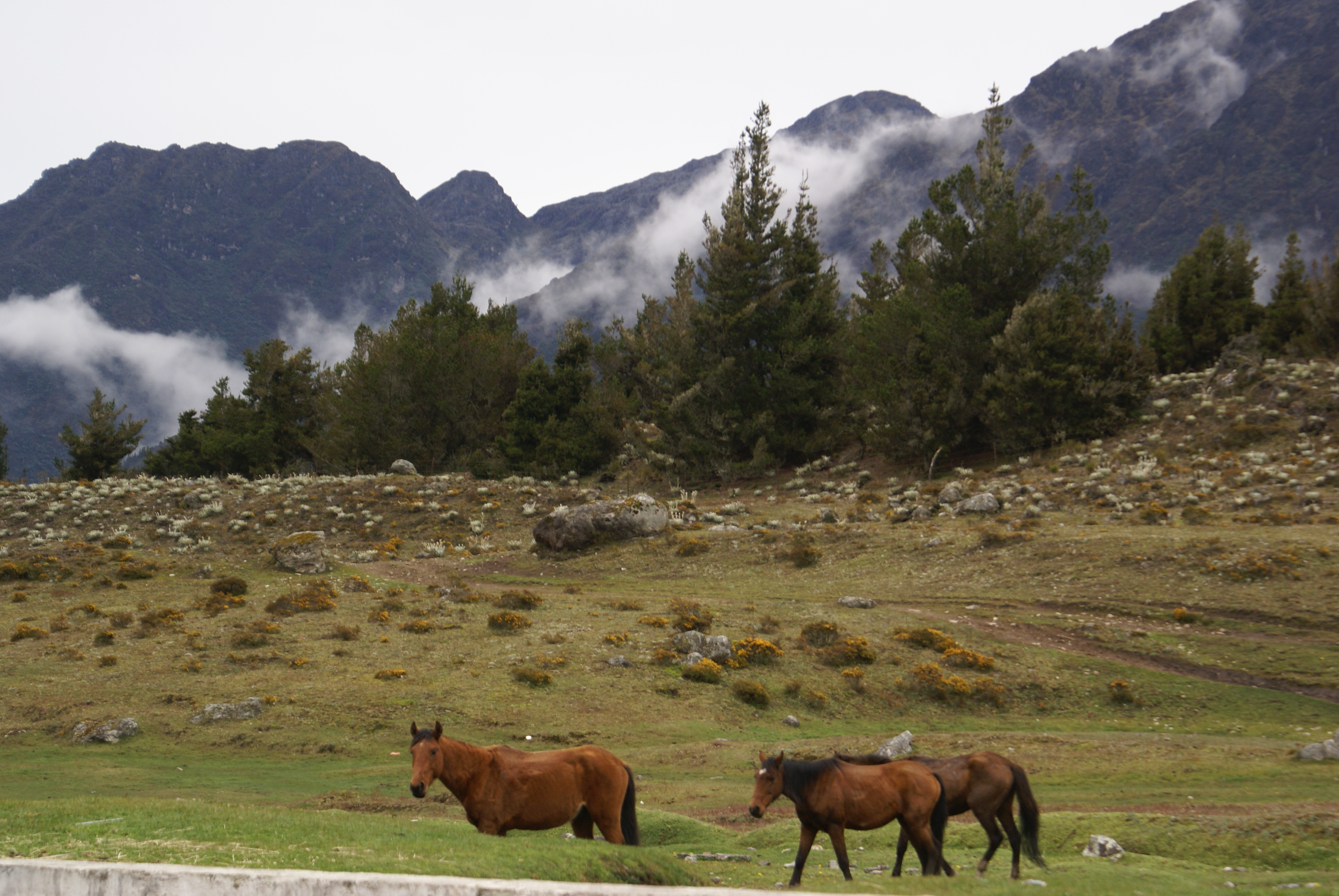
Horses in the Park

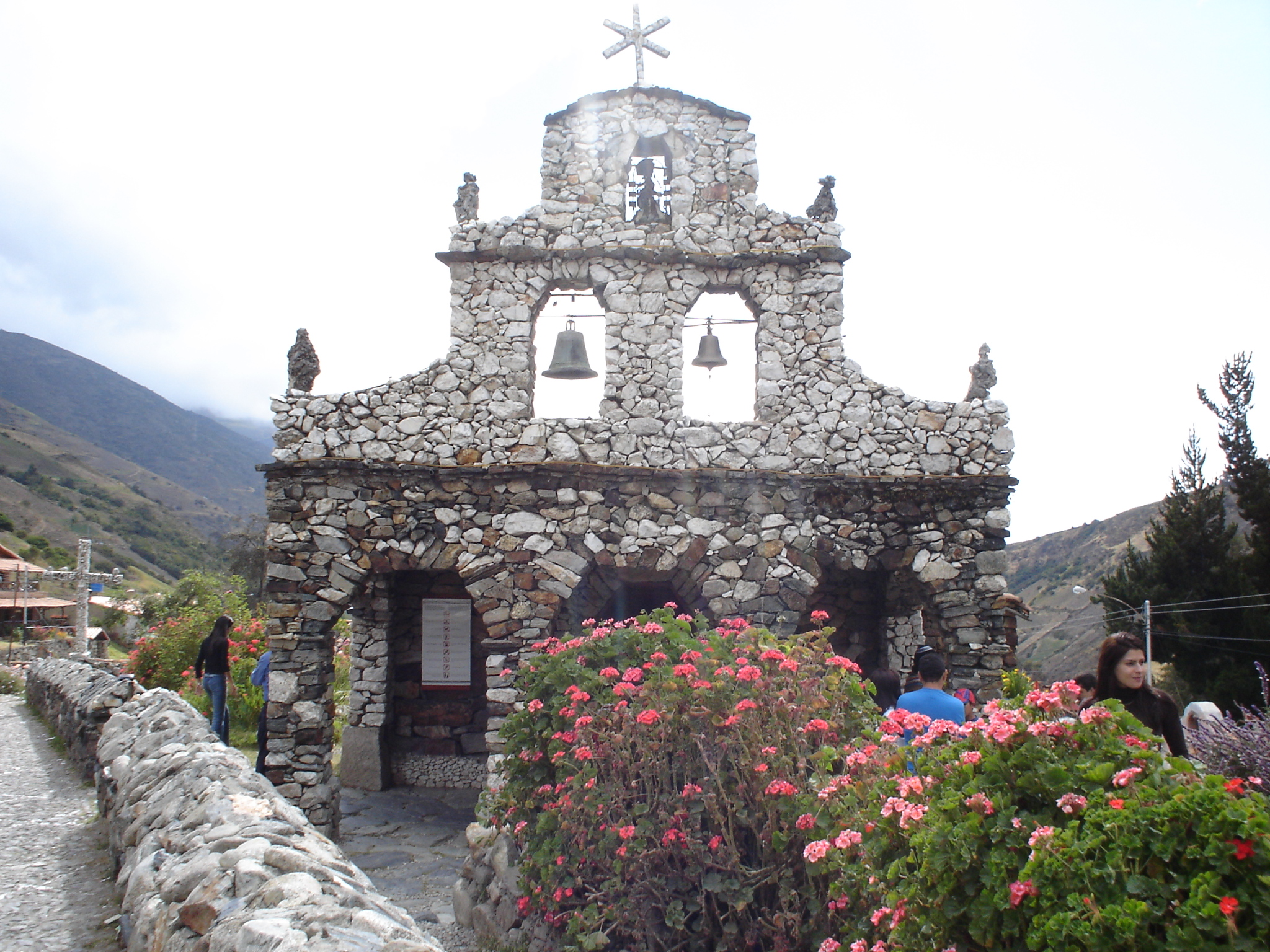
Our Lady of Coromoto chapel

== See also ==
- Sierra Nevada de Mérida
- Sierra de Santo Domingo
