= Pico Mucuñuque =

Mountain in Venezuela

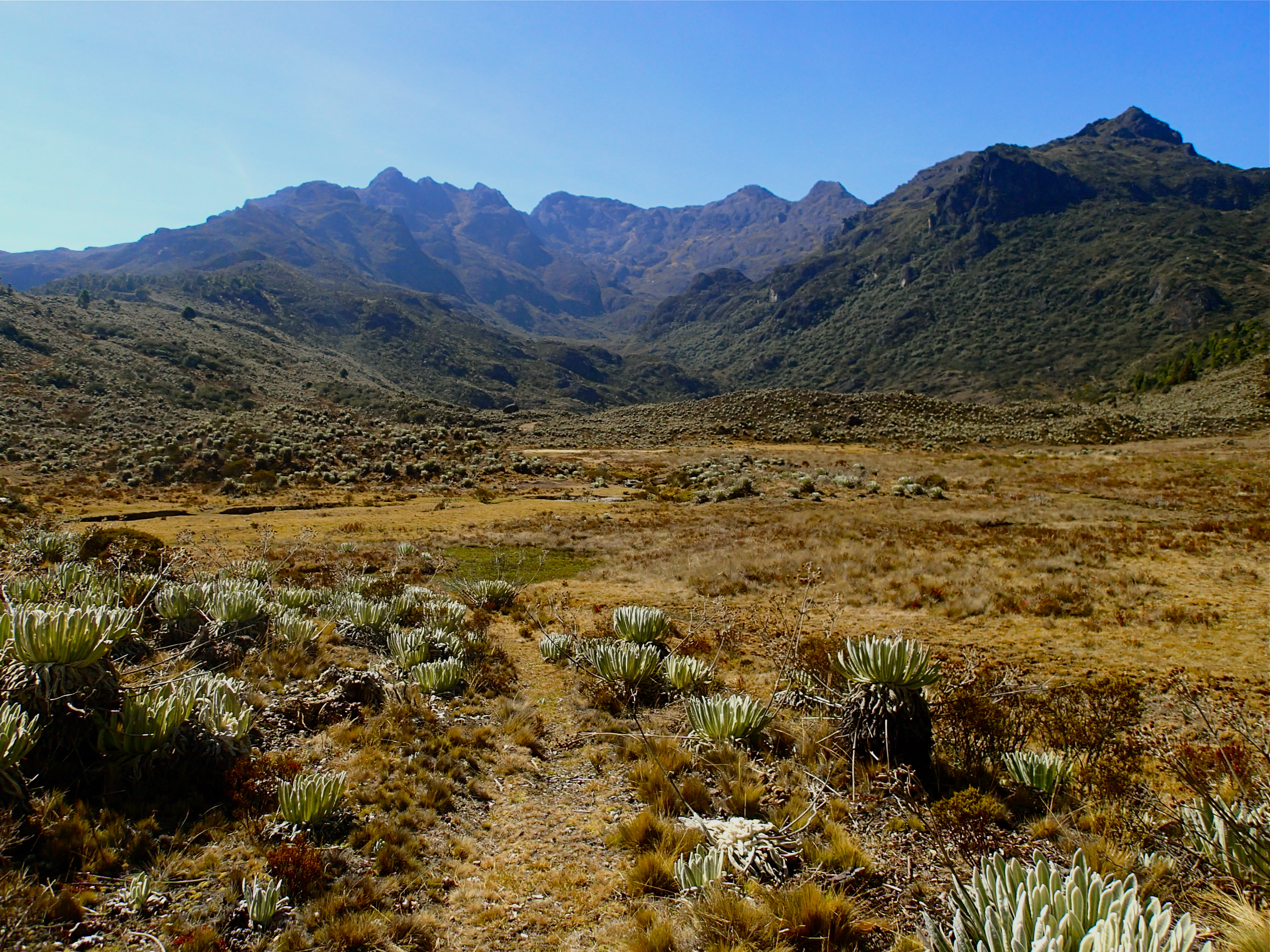

Highest point
- Elevation: 4,609 m (15,121 ft)
- Coordinates: 8°45′19″N 70°48′03″W

Geography
- Location: Mérida, Venezuela
- Parent range: Sierra de Santo Domingo, Andes

Pico Mucuñuque is a mountain in the Sierra de Santo Domingo range of the Venezuelan Andes, located in Mérida state, Venezuela. It has a height of 4,609 metres.

== See also ==
- List of mountains in the Andes
