= Kettle Mucubají =

- Laguna de Mucubají (Spanish)
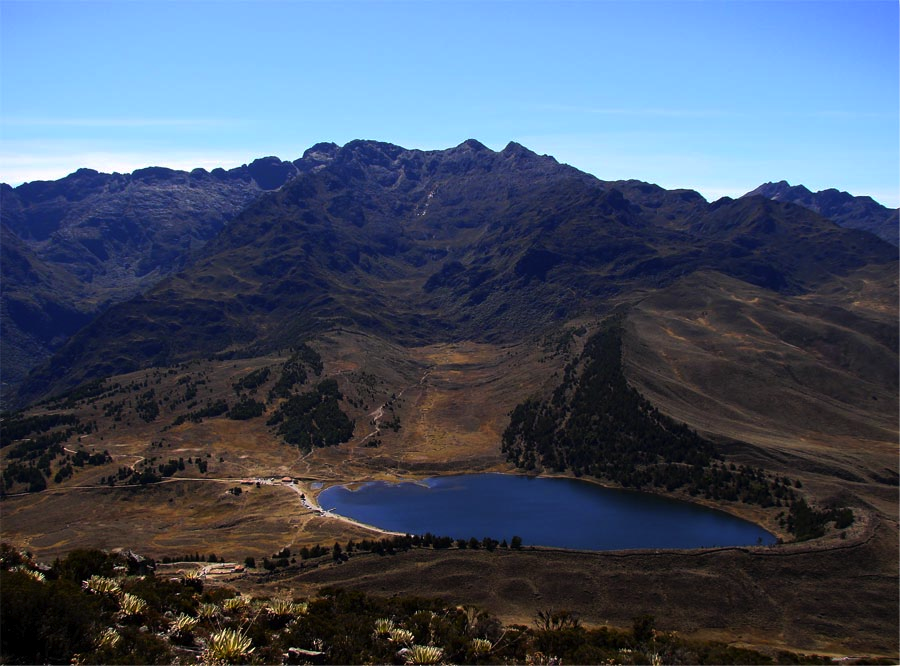
- Photography by Elides Sulbarán

- Location within Venezuela
- Location: Sierra Nevada National Park, Mérida, Venezuela
- Coordinates: 8°47′50″N 70°49′43″W
- Type: glacial lake

Kettle Mucubají (Spanish: Laguna de Mucubají) is a glacial lake located in Sierra Nevada National Park, in the Mérida State of Venezuela. The lake is 3625–3655 metres above sea level. Kettle Mucubají is one of the biggest kettles in the valley and is one of the main tourist attractions in the area, which is known for its scenery. In 2007, the Ramsar List of Wetlands of International Importance recognised the importance of Lake Mucubají in the region.

== Origin ==
The glacial origin of the Kettle Mucubají is evident because of the visible footprint left by the Mucubají ravine tens of thousands of years ago. This ravine was created by the action of a receding glacier, which was also sealed by an accumulation of unconsolidated glacial debris (moraine) created by the lake. This moraine changed the course of the ravine from Rio Chama to Rio Orinoco and to the Atlantic Ocean.

== Fauna and vegetation ==
The kettle is located in a páramo ecosystem characteristic of the high mountains of the northern Andes. Vegetation is dominated by espeletia and several grasses, mosses and herbs. The páramo brown, Redonda chiquinquirana, is a butterfly species that is currently known from only three localities around Mucubají.

Exotic species of plants and fishes have been introduced for ornamental and recreational purposes. Pines were planted around the kettle and some walking trails. Trouts were brought from Europe and North America in 1937 and there is a fishing season from October 16 to September 30.

== Tourism and access routes ==
Located sixty km from the city of Mérida, Kettle Mucubají has a car access route that takes visitors directly to the kettle, where they can park nearby. In the general area there are several small businesses offering guide services, travel guides and maps. There are several options to explore the area and visit other scenic kettles such Laguna Negra, which is about one and a half hour walk or a 40-minute horse ride from Kettle Mucubají. Tourists make this journey in order to view the landscapes in this glacial valley.

Special permission is required for camping in order to access higher lands with other kettles such as Laguna Los Patos. Additional equipment and training is also required. The permit is easy to obtain by following the necessary process in the forest ranger's office, which is located in the area.
