= Chama River =

The Chama River may refer to:

- Chama River (Venezuela), the main river of the state of Mérida in Venezuela
- Rio Chama, United States, a tributary of the Rio Grande
