= Pico Humboldt =

Mountain peak in Venezuela

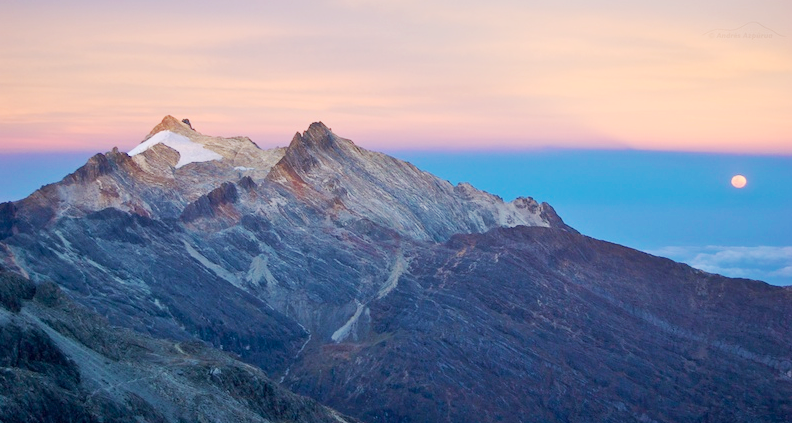
- Pico Humboldt in 2008

Highest point
- Elevation: 4,925 m (16,158 ft)
- Prominence: 440 m
- Isolation: 5.62 km (3.49 mi)
- Coordinates: 8°32′58.78″N 70°59′46.11″W

Geography
- Location: Mérida, Venezuela
- Parent range: Sierra Nevada, Andes

Climbing
- First ascent: 1911 by Alfredo Jahn
- Easiest route: Laguna del Suero

Pico Humboldt is a summit in Mérida, Venezuela. The peak is Venezuela's second highest peak, at 4,925 meters above sea level. It is located in the Sierra Nevada de Merida, in the Venezuelan Andes of (Mérida State). The peak, its sister peak Pico Bonpland, and the surrounding páramos are protected by the Sierra Nevada National Park. The mountain is named after German explorer and naturalist Alexander von Humboldt.

== Glaciers ==
The summit was formerly surrounded by glaciers, including the two largest out of the four glaciers remaining in the country (the other two smaller glaciers were on Pico Bolívar). The glaciers on Humboldt Peak (as most tropical glaciers) have been receding fast since the 1970s. By 2009, all but one glacier, the Humboldt Glacier, had vanished. In 2019, the remaining glacier covers an area of 0.1 km^{2} and was forecast to melt completely within a decade: in May 2024, the Humboldt Glacier was officially downgraded to an ice field, no longer considered a glacier.

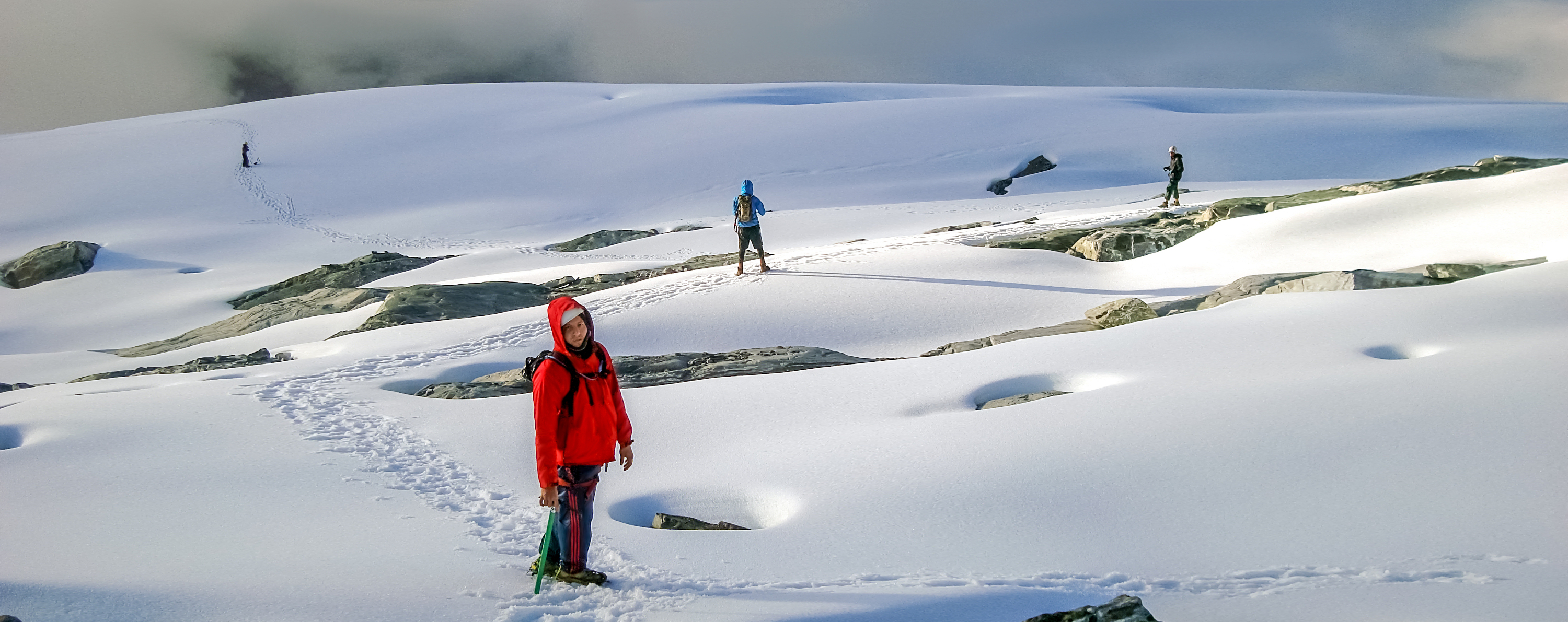
Humboldt glaciers in 2011

== Glacier ecosystem ==
Humboldt peak also hosts the last remnant of the Tropical glacier ecosystem of the Cordillera de Merida. This ecosystem is formed by the interconnected remaining ice substrate, proglacial lakes and glacier forefield. As the ice substrate declines, the risk of losing these connections increases and the ecosystem is considered critically endangered (category CR) with high risk of imminent collapse, according to a recent IUCN Red List of Ecosystems assessment.
