= Pico Bonpland =

Mountain in Venezuela

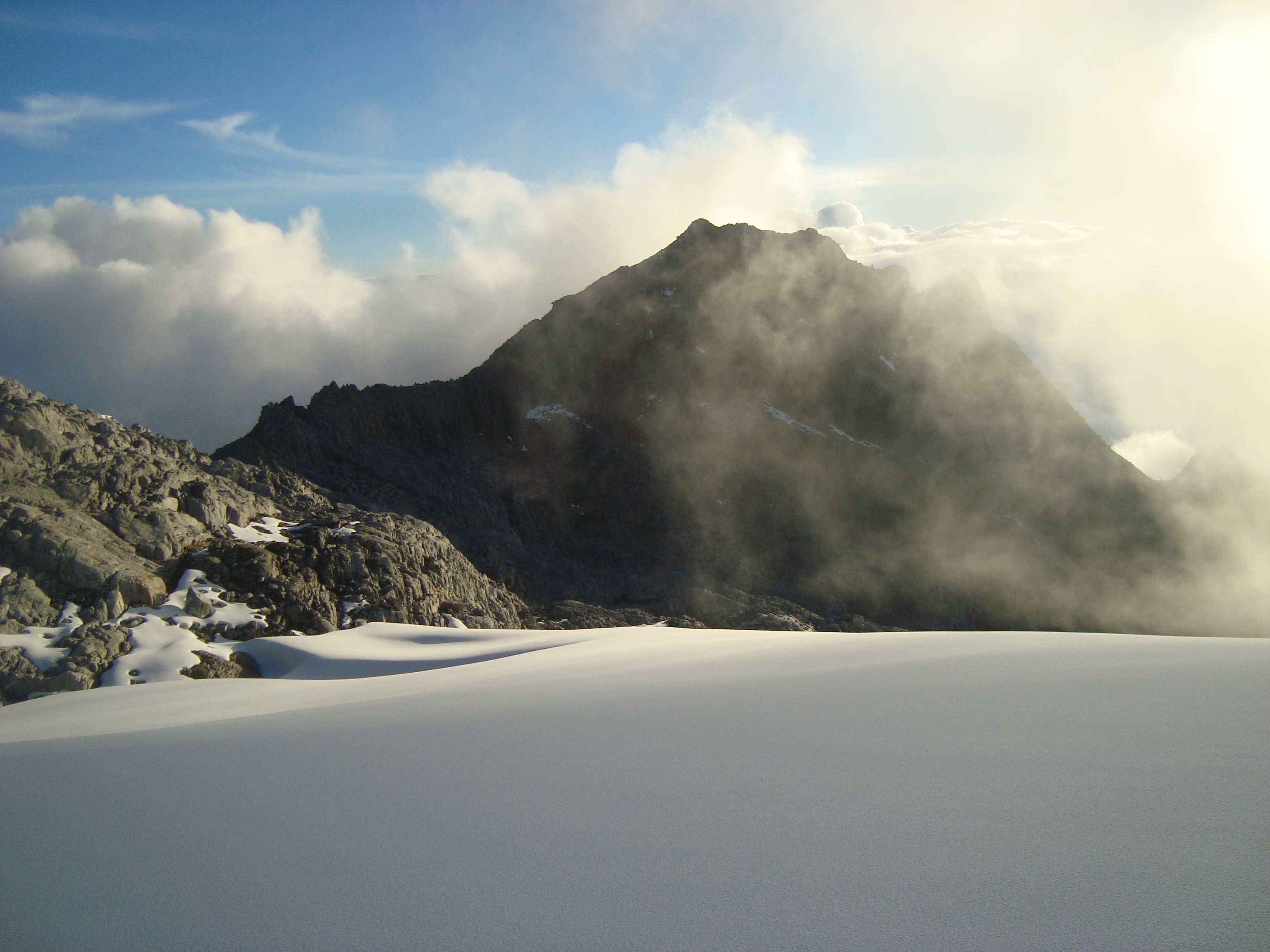
- Pico Bonpland as seen from the Pico Humboldt

Highest point
- Elevation: 4,883 m (16,020 ft)
- Coordinates: 8°32′N 71°00′W

Geography
- Location: Mérida, Venezuela
- Parent range: Sierra Nevada, Andes

Climbing
- First ascent: 1911 by Alfredo Jahn (was the same ascent to the Pico Humboldt as well)
- Easiest route: By the excursionist route Pico Espejo-Mucuy.

Pico Bonpland is Venezuela's fourth-highest peak, at 4,883 metres above sea level. It is located in the Sierra Nevada de Merida, in the Venezuelan Andes of (Mérida State). The peak with its sister peak Pico Humboldt, and the surrounding páramos are protected by the Sierra Nevada National Park. The name of the peak is in honor of Aimé Bonpland, although he never visited the Venezuelan Andes.

The glaciers located in the Bonpland were the result from Merida glaciation in the Pleistocene. By 2011 they had all disappeared.
