= Pico La Concha =

Mountain in Venezuela

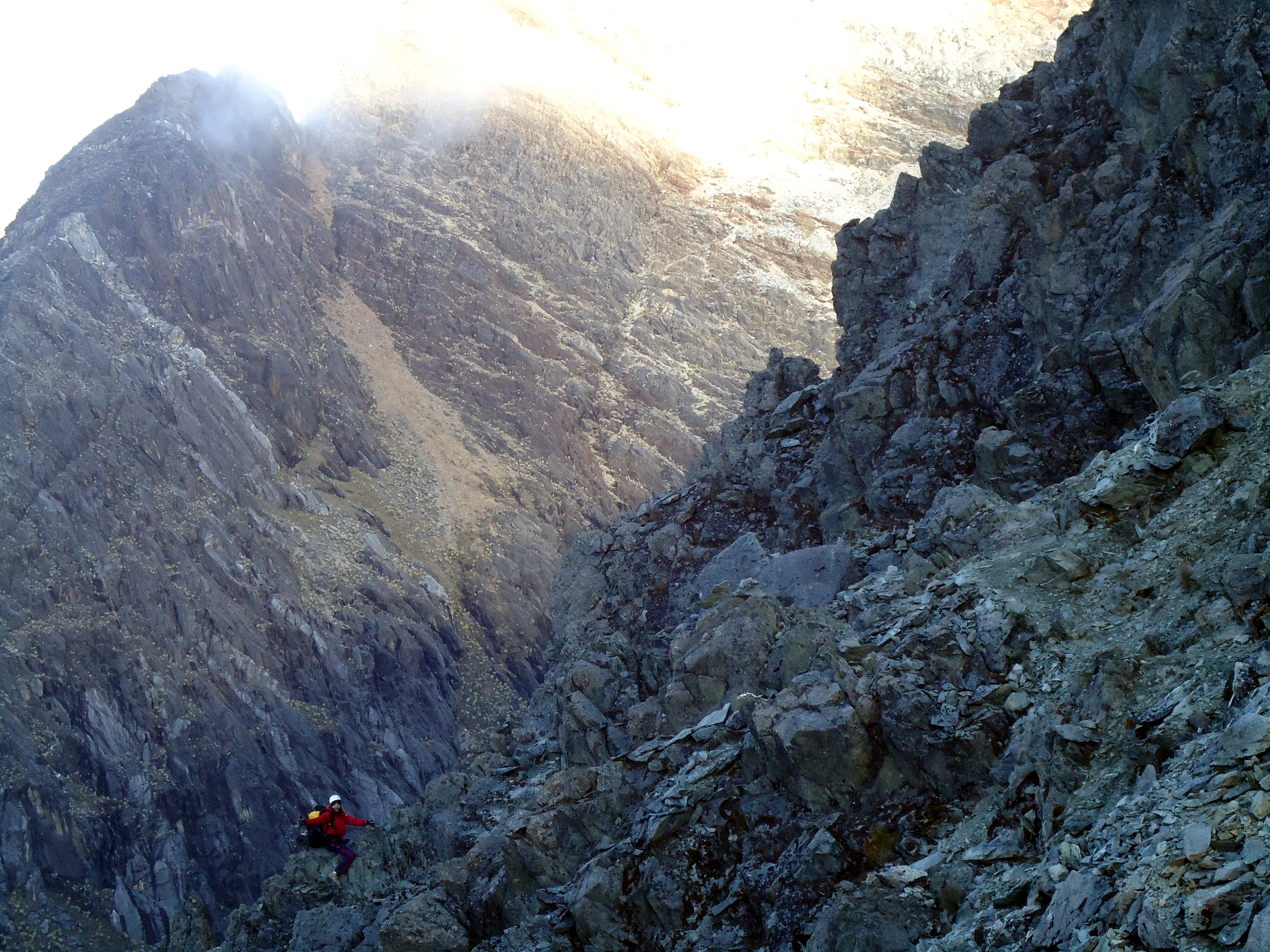
- Pico La Concha as seen from Mérida.

Highest point
- Elevation: 4,922 m (16,148 ft)
- Coordinates: 8°32′31″N 71°01′29″W

Geography
- Location: Mérida, Venezuela
- Parent range: Sierra Nevada, Andes

Climbing
- Easiest route: La Mucuy

Pico La Concha is a mountain in the Andes of Venezuela. It has a height of 4,922 metres.

== See also ==
- List of mountains in the Andes
