= Venezuelan Andes =

Mountain system in Venezuela

- Andes venezolanos
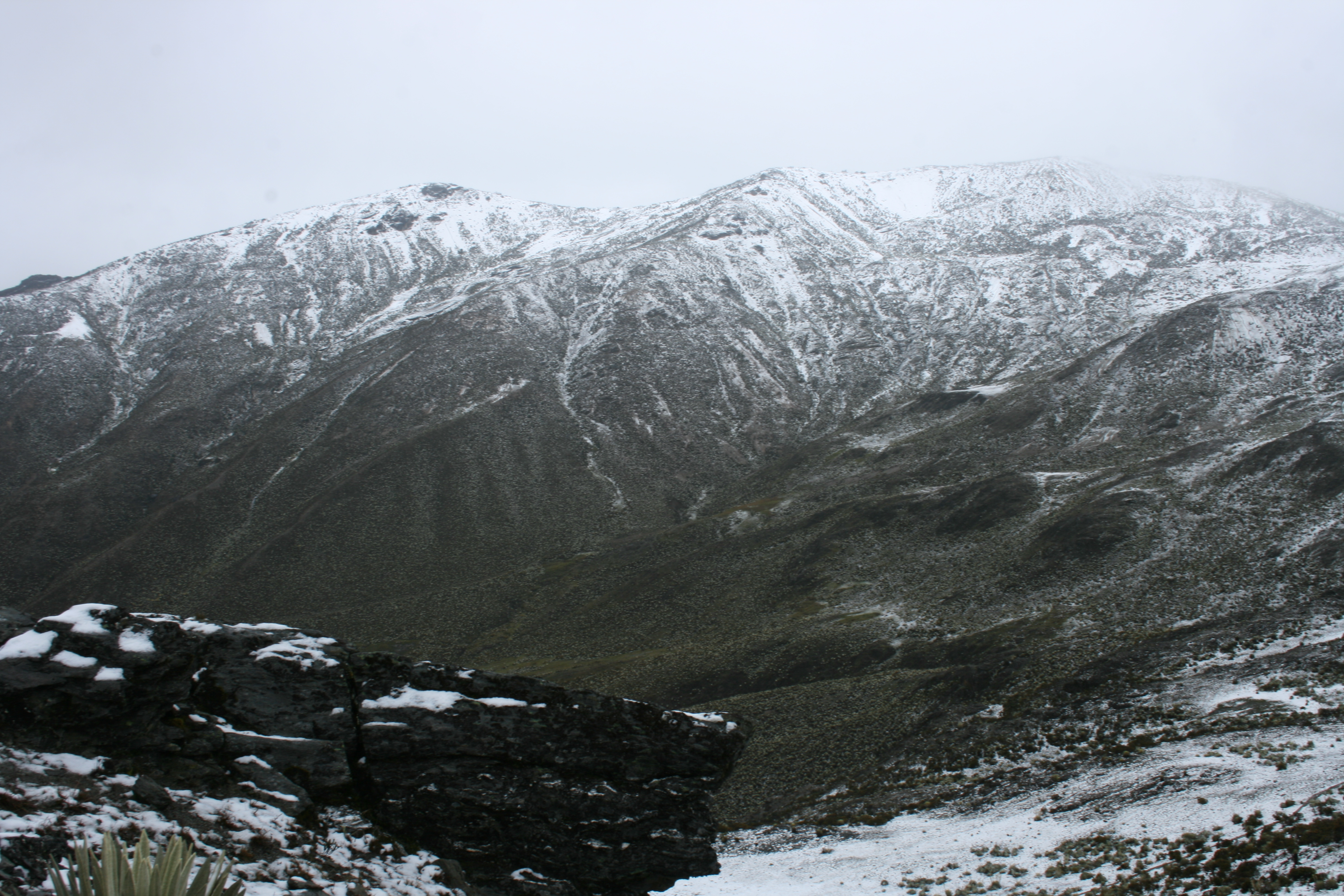
- A view of Collado of Condor Peak in Venezuelan Andes

Highest point
- Coordinates: 8°45′N 70°55′W

Geography
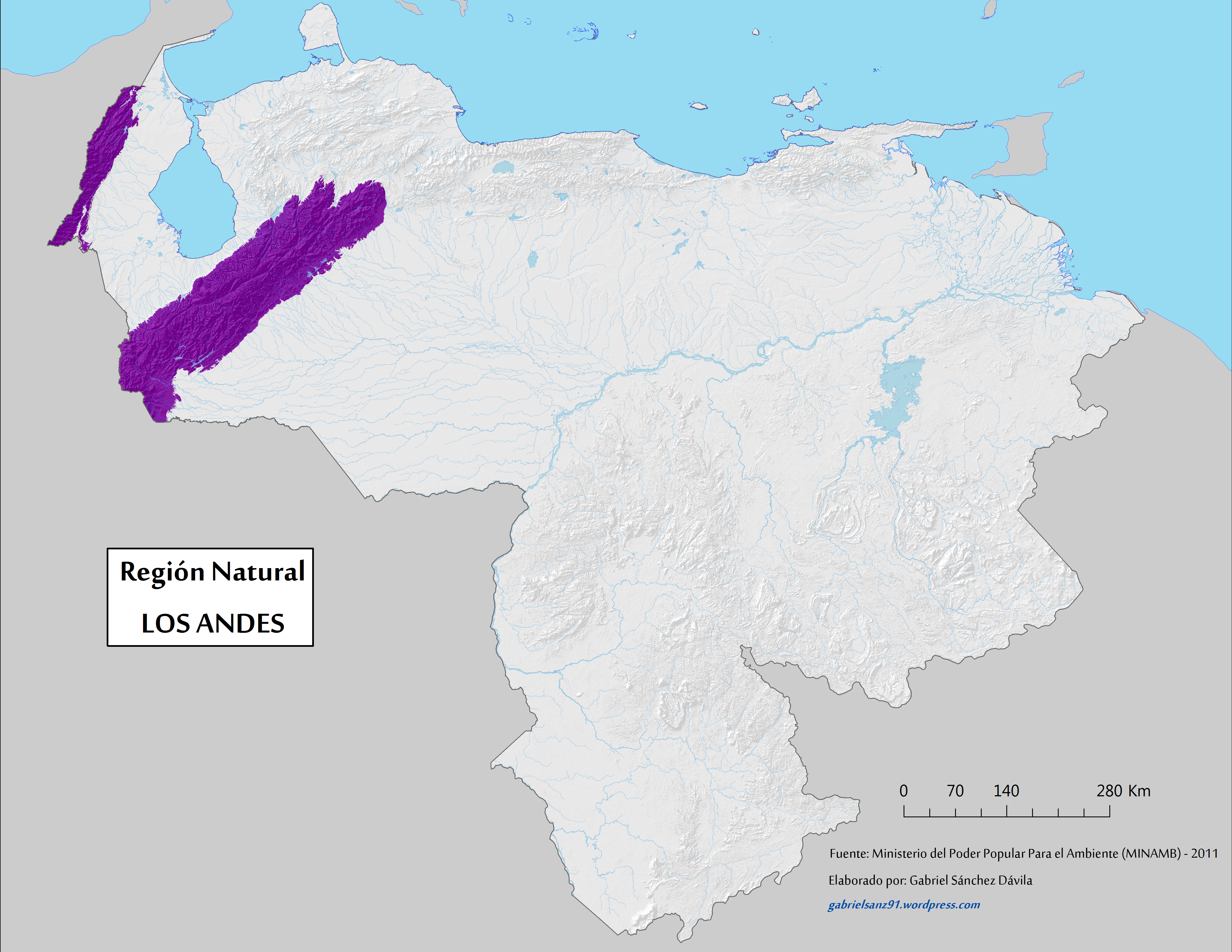
- Geographic map of the Andean Venezuelan natural region.
- Location: Táchira, Mérida and Trujillo states, the southern area of Lara, and portions of higher areas on the western side of Barinas, Apure, Portuguesa and Zulia states
- Parent range: Andes

Geology
- Rock age: Eocene
- Rock type(s): Igneous and metamorphic rocks

The Venezuelan Andes (Spanish: Andes Venezolanos) also simply known as the Andes (Spanish: Los Andes) in Venezuela, are a mountain system that form the northernmost extension of the Andes. They are fully identified, both by their geological origin as by the components of the relief, the constituent rocks and the geological structure.

The Venezuelan Andean system represents the terminal bifurcation of the Cordillera Oriental de Colombia, which in Venezuelan territory consists of two mountainous branches: the Sierra de Perijá, smaller, slightly displaced from southwest to northeast with 7,500 km^{2} in Venezuela; and a larger, frankly oriented Southwest to northeast with about 40,000 km^{2}, the Cordillera de Mérida, commonly known as the proper Venezuelan Andes. The highest point in Venezuela is located in this natural region. It covers around 5.2% of the national territory, being the 4th largest natural region in Venezuela.

== Geography ==
Venezuelan Andes can be divided in two sections:

- Cordillera de Mérida: covering almost all the territory of Táchira, Mérida and Trujillo states, the southern area of Lara, and portions of higher areas on the western side of Barinas, Apure and Portuguesa states. It can be divided in three subregions:
1. Western Venezuelan Andes (Macizo del Tamá, Páramos Batallón y La Negra).
2. Central Venezuelan Andes (Macizo del Sur, Sierra Nevada de Mérida, Sierra de la Culata, Sierra de Santo Domingo).
3. North-Eastern Venezuelan Andes (Sierra de Trujillo, Sierra de Portuguesa, Lara Andes)
- Sierra de Perijá: located at the western extreme of Venezuela in Zulia state, bordering Colombia.

== Geology ==
They have a common geological origin, which dates back to the Eocene period of the early Tertiary era, about 40-50 million years ago, coincides with the beginning of the contact of the three tectonic plates (Nazca, Caribbean and South American) that began their orographic rise.

Before the rise of the current Venezuelan Andes, between the Cambrian and Silurian periods, the so-called primitive Andes emerged, which already for the Triassic period (Mesozoic era) had been almost completely flattened because of the intense erosive process to which were subjected.

=== Quaternary tectonics ===
It's characterized by the interaction of the three most important lithospheric plates in the region: Nazca, Caribbean and South American. A northwest-southwest oriented direction of compression produces vertical and horizontal deformation components, with the formation of thrusts align the Andean borders, and strike-slip faults. The split of Venezuelan Andes apparently began in the Late Eocene, and its present height was probably attained before the Quaternary.

During the Quaternary. the main active structures are the strike-slip faults. the principal one being the Boconó Fault Zone, with a measured dextral displacement of several millimeters per year. In the field this displacement is shown by the existence of fault trenches, fault depressions, sag ponds, offset ridges and lateral moraines.

=== Glacial geology ===
Like all tropical mountain ranges with altitudes above 3,000 m, the Venezuelan Andes were affected by Pleistocene glaciations.

==== Late Pleistocene glaciation ====
Two morainic complexes have been recognized in the Cordillera de Mérida: one between 2,600 and 2,800 m altitude, and another one between 2,900 and 3,500 m. These two levels have been considered as Early and Late Stades, respectively, of the Mérida glaciation. The moraines of the Late Stade are topographically well represented, and several superposed moraines, or morainic complexes, are found. The glaciated area in Cordillera de Mérida during the Last Glacial Maximum was approximately 600 km^{2}

In the Sierra de Perijá, the existence of moraines has been mentioned at altitudes between 2,700 and 3,100 m. In the absence of more detailed data, these have been tentatively assigned to the Late Stade of the Mérida glaciation.

==== Late Holocene glaciation ====
Evidence of Late Holocene morainic sedimentation are based on palynological and radiocarbon analyses, which established a cold phase between the 15th and middle-19th centuries, which can be correlate with the Little Ice Age. The moraines associated with this phase are most probably those located at an altitude of approximately 4,700 m between 100 and 200 below the terminal zone of present-day glaciers.

== Gallery ==
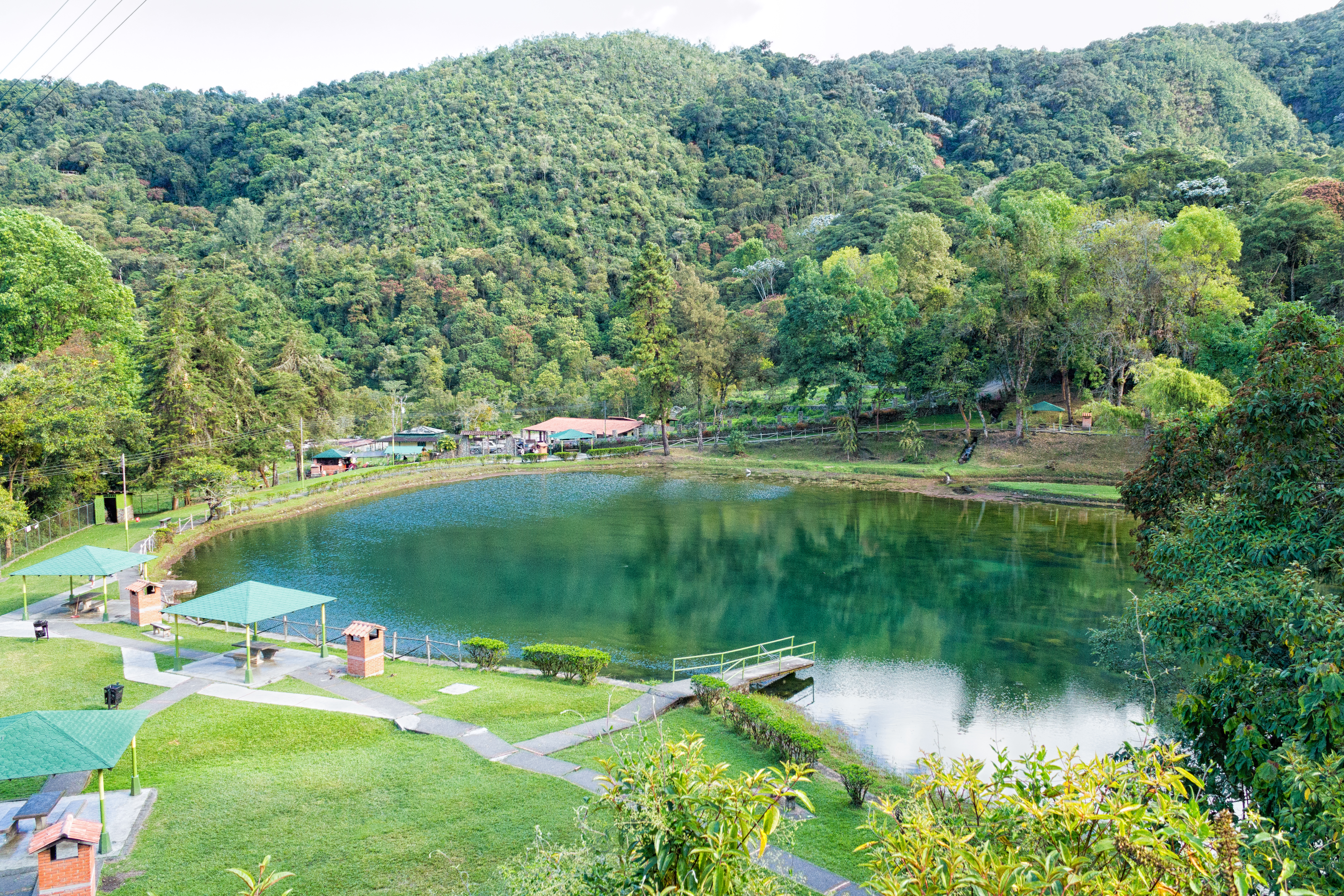
Los Cedros Lagoon, Trujillo State

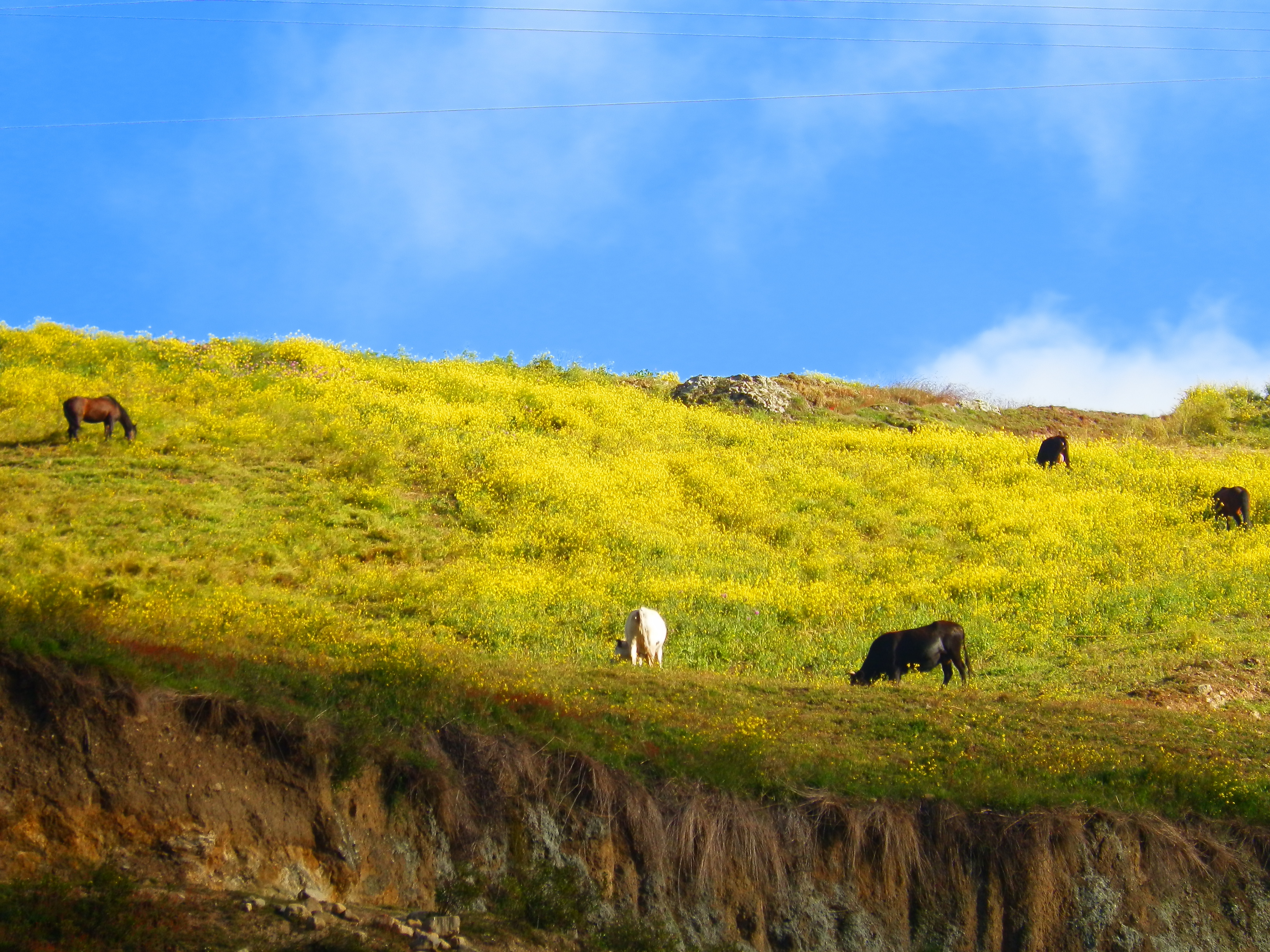
Fauna of the Venezuelan Andes

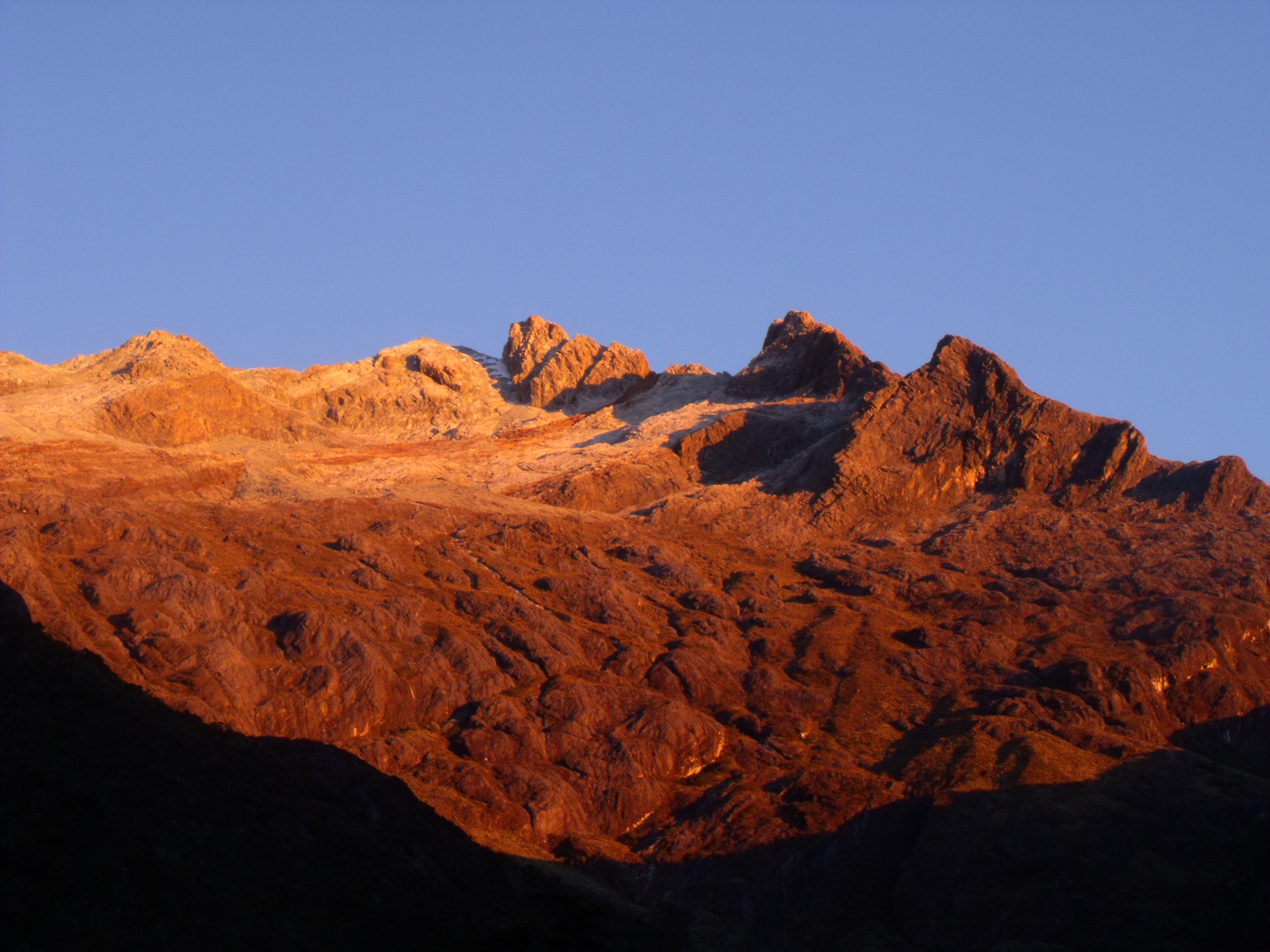
Humboldt Peak

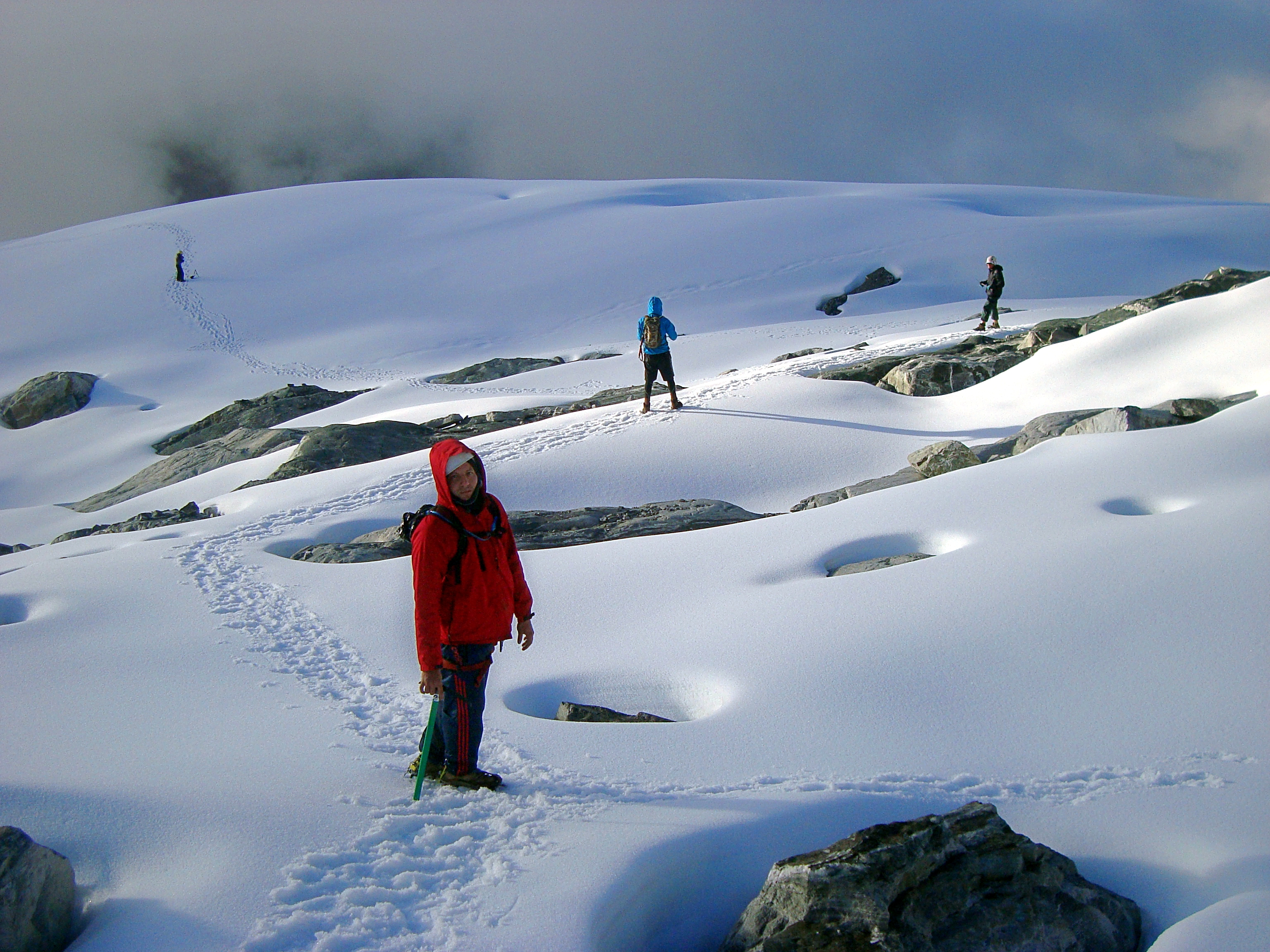
Snow in the Humboldt Peak

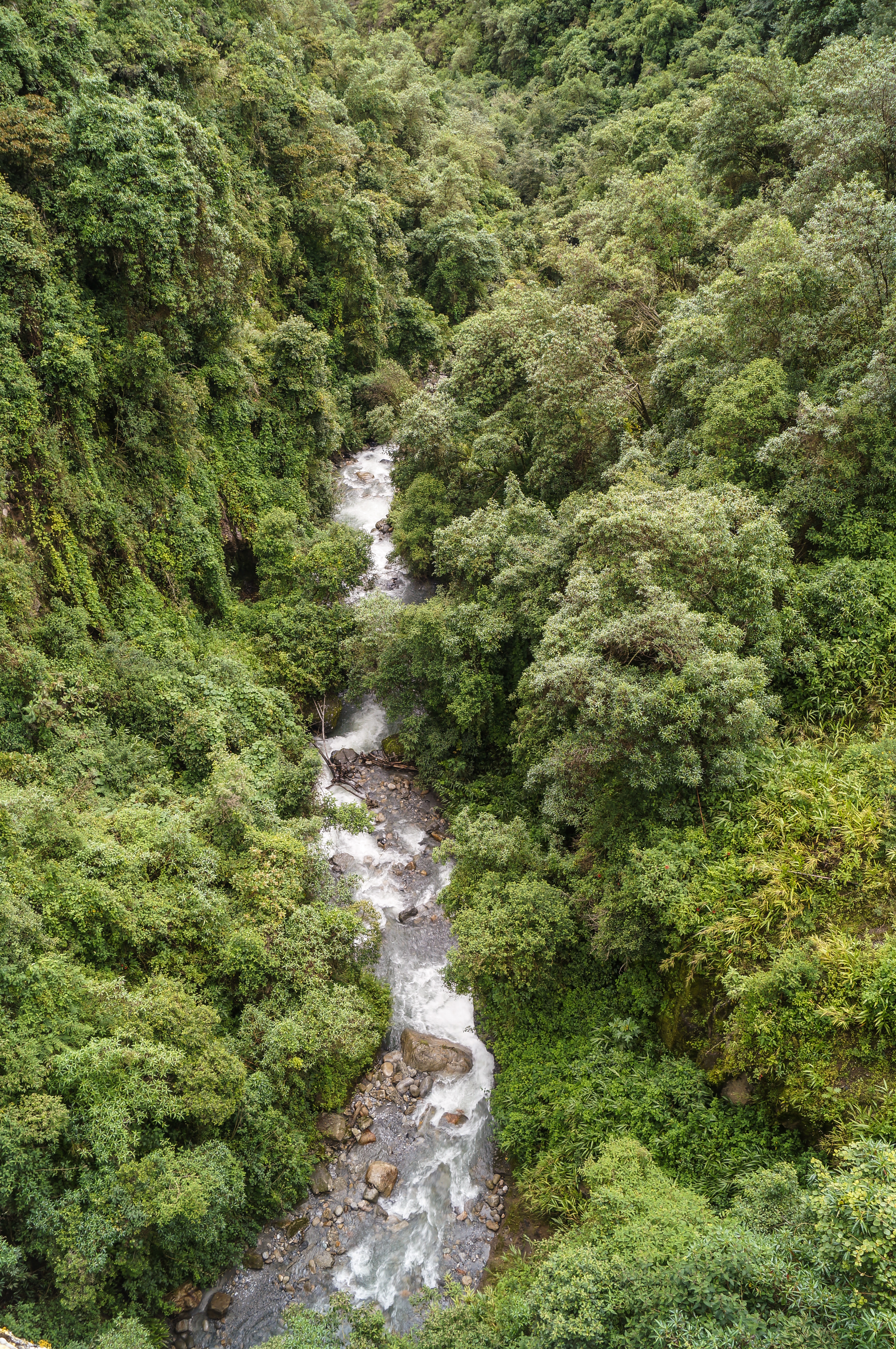
Butare River

== See also ==
- Andes
