= Sierra de Santo Domingo =

Mountain range in Venezuela

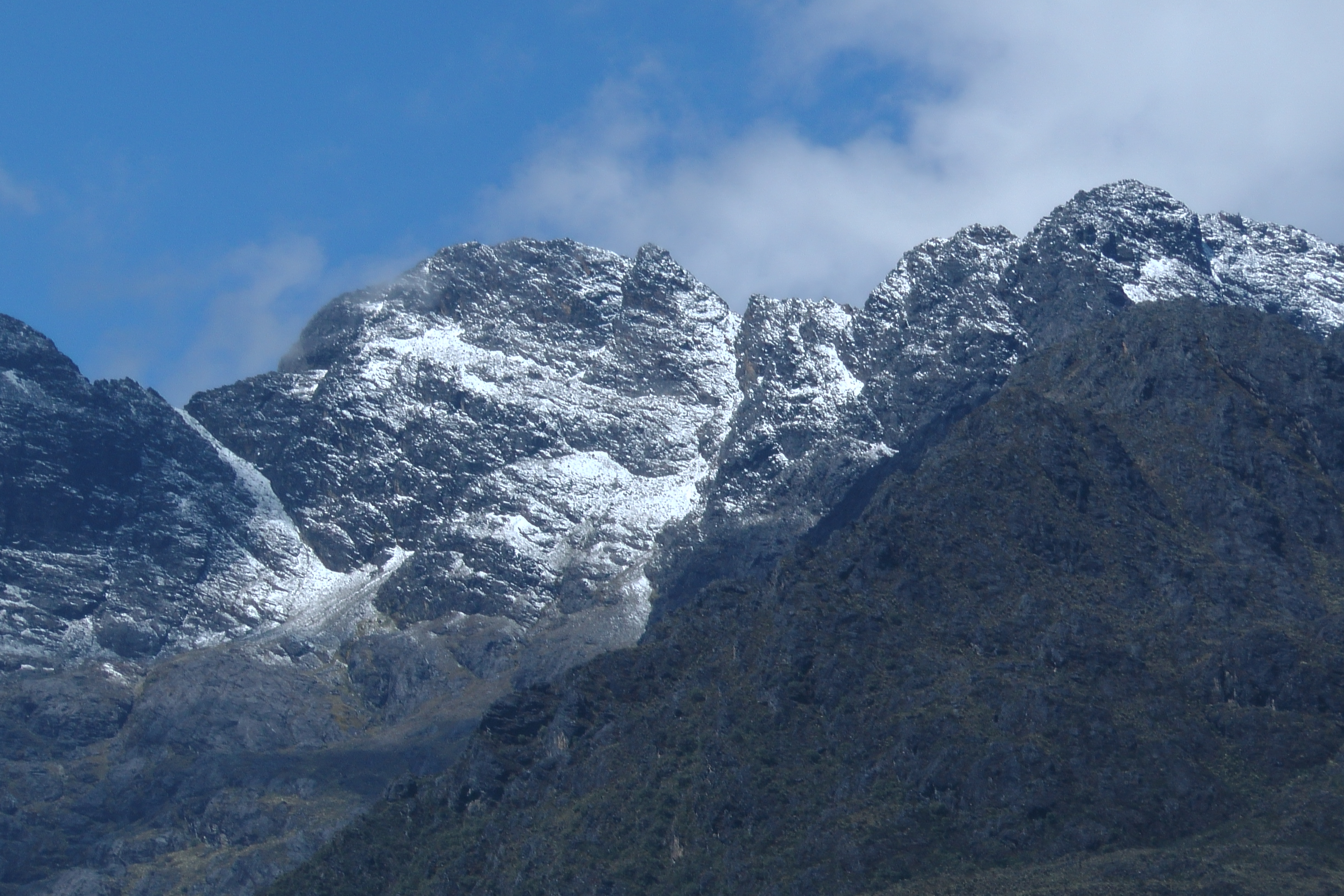
- Pico Mucuñuque

Highest point
- Peak: Pico Mucuñuque
- Elevation: 15,121 ft (4,609 m)
- Coordinates: 8°45′19″N 70°48′03″W

Dimensions
- Length: 22 mi (35 km) SW-NE

Geography
- Country: Venezuela
- States: Merida and Barinas

Geology
- Rock age: Precambrian

The Sierra de Santo Domingo (used to be referred to as the Sierra Nevada de Santo Domingo of Mérida) is a mountain range belonging to the Sierra Nevada National Park, which extends across the western part of Venezuela, specifically through the states of Barinas and Mérida. It sustains elevations above 3,500 metres (11,500 ft) above sea level. Geologically, it shares one of the oldest rock substrates in Venezuela's stratigraphic record and the greatest geological age yet found in the Venezuelan Andes. These consist of metamorphic and igneous rocks belonging to the Upper Precambrian, with ages of approximately 600 million years, grouped under the designation of the Iglesias Complex. During the Quaternary, cooling conditions allowed the Sierra de Santo Domingo to be covered by mountain glaciers in valleys situated above 2,900–3,000 metres (9,500–9,800 ft) above sea level.

== Climate ==
Annual mean temperatures in the Sierra de Santo Domingo range from temperate (17.5 °C (63.5 °F)) to glacial (−0.2 °C (31.6 °F)), with an overall average of 6.4 °C (43.5 °F). During the dry season (November through March), frost events are very common, while during the wet season (June through September), snowfall frequently occurs at elevations above 4,000 metres (13,123 ft).

The climate of the sierra can be classified under three Köppen types: a warm temperate highland climate with dry winters (Cwb) at elevations below 2,900 metres (9,514 ft); an alpine tundra climate (ETH) across the majority of its territory; and a highland ice cap climate (EFH) confined to the orographic summits of the range.

== See also ==
- Sierra Nevada National Park (Venezuela)
- Sierra La Culata
- Sierra Nevada de Mérida
- Merida glaciation
