= Sierra Nevada de Mérida =

Mountain range in Venezuela

Sierra Nevada de Merida
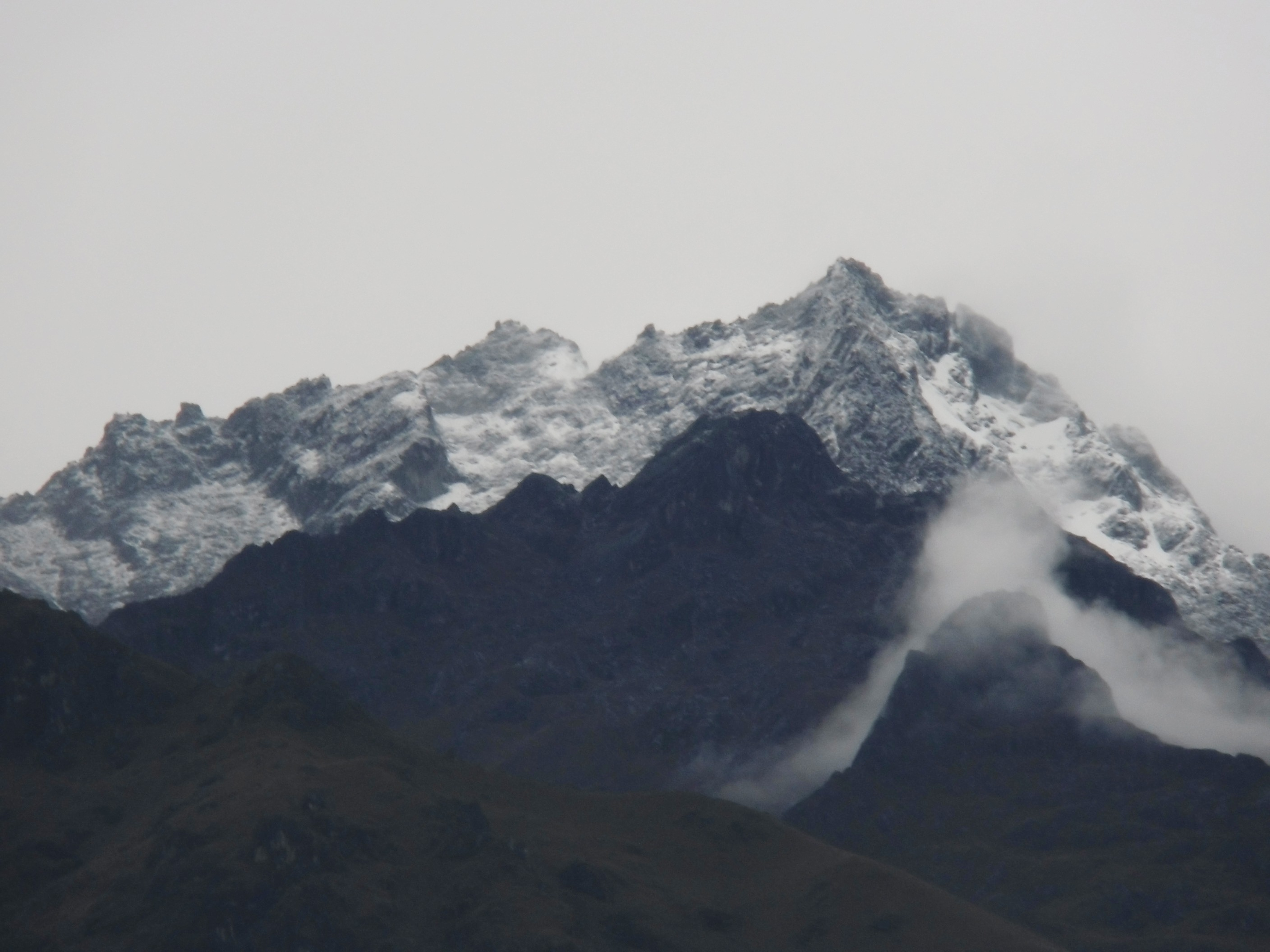
- Remnants of glaciers on the Pico Bolívar

Highest point
- Peak: Pico Bolívar
- Elevation: 16,342 ft (4,981 m)
- Coordinates: 8°34′12.61″N 71°00′45.32″W

Dimensions
- Length: 200 mi (320 km) Southeast-Northwest

Geography
- Country: Venezuela
- States: Merida and Barinas

Geology
- Rock age: Precambrian

The Sierra Nevada de Mérida is the highest mountain range in the largest massif in Venezuela, the Cordillera de Mérida, which in turn is part of the northern extent of the Cordillera de los Andes (Andes Mountains). The Sierra Nevada de Mérida includes the highest peaks in Venezuela, Pico Bolívar, which has an elevation of 4,981 metres (16,342 ft), Pico Humboldt, Pico Bonpland and others.

The Sierra Nevada National Park is a protected area within the range.

The Cordillera de Mérida is a series of mountain ranges, or massif, in northwestern Venezuela. The Cordillera de Mérida is a northeastern extension of the Andes Mountains. The ranges run southwest–northeast between the Venezuelan-Colombian border and the Venezuelan coastal range. The Táchira depression separates the Cordillera de Mérida from the Cordillera Oriental, which forms the Colombia-Venezuela border.

The ranges runs from southwest to northeast and parts lie within each of the following states: Táchira, Mérida, Barinas, Trujillo, Portuguesa and Lara. The southeastern slopes are drained by tributaries of the Orinoco River, while the streams that drain the northwestern slopes empty into Lake Maracaibo. At the northeast tip of the massif lies the town of Barquisimeto and the headwaters of the River Cojedes.

In the centre of the massif is the city of Mérida. Two ranges of peaks lie on either side of the city, the Sierra de la Culata to the north and Sierra Nevada de Mérida to the south. Pico Bolívar, at 4,981 meters elevation (16,342 feet), is the highest peak in Venezuela.

Most of the ranges are covered by Venezuelan Andes montane forests, although the highest elevations (above 3,100 meters) are above tree line. These ranges are home to the Cordillera de Mérida páramo, an enclave of the páramo (tropical alpine grasslands) of the northern Andes. Protected areas in the massif include Sierra Nevada National Park.

== Glaciers ==
In 1991 the mountain range had five glaciers situated near its peaks. However, as of 2017, only one glacier (10% of its size 30 years earlier) remained near Pico Humboldt. It was then predicted this last glacier would disappear within the next ten or twenty years, but already in May 2024, the Humboldt Glacier was officially downgraded to an ice field and thus no longer considered a glacier.

The snowy season is between July–August. The snows cover the mountains above 4.200 meters, and sometimes above 3.800 meters.[2]

== Gallery ==
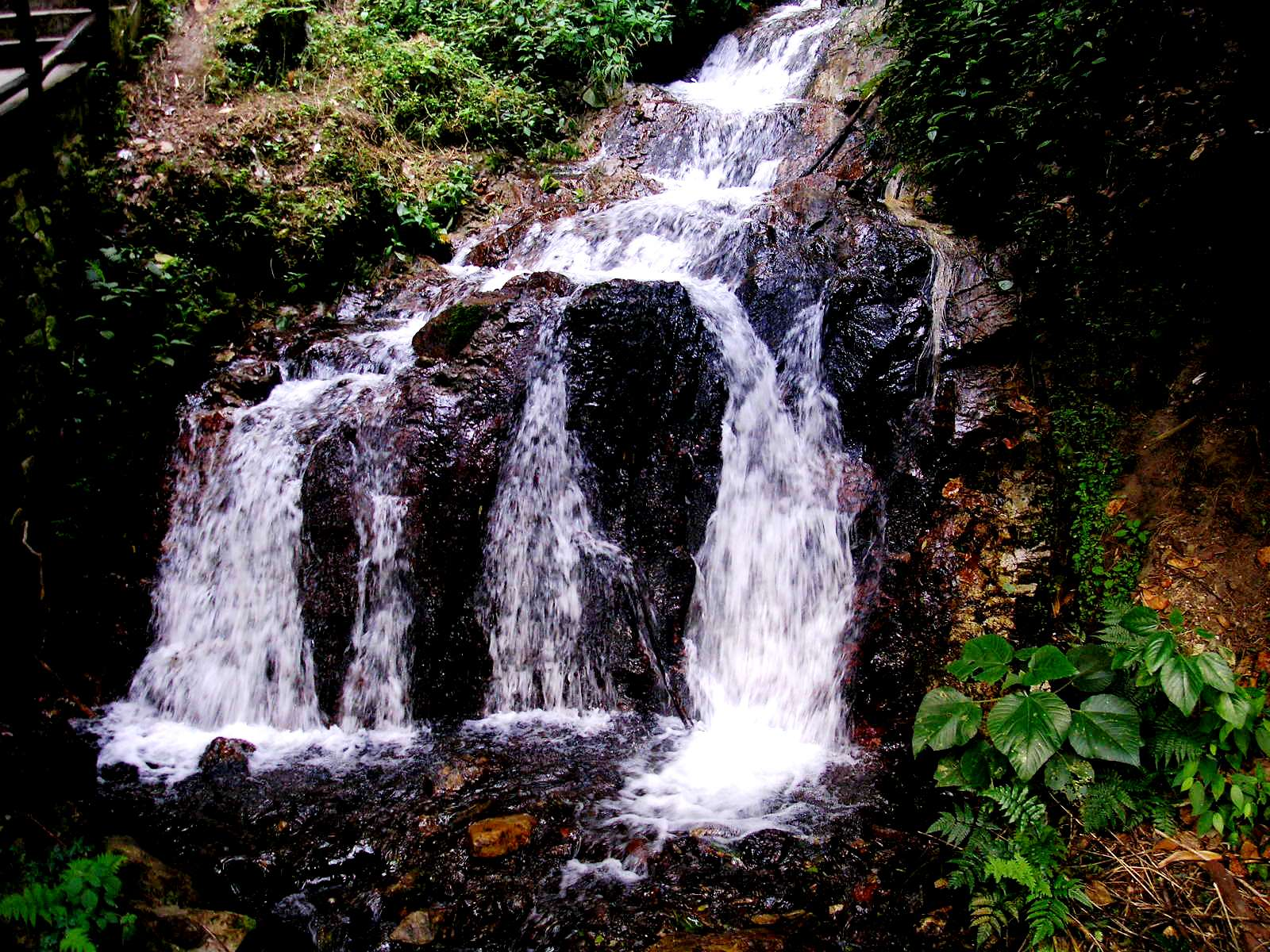
El Velo de la Novia waterfall

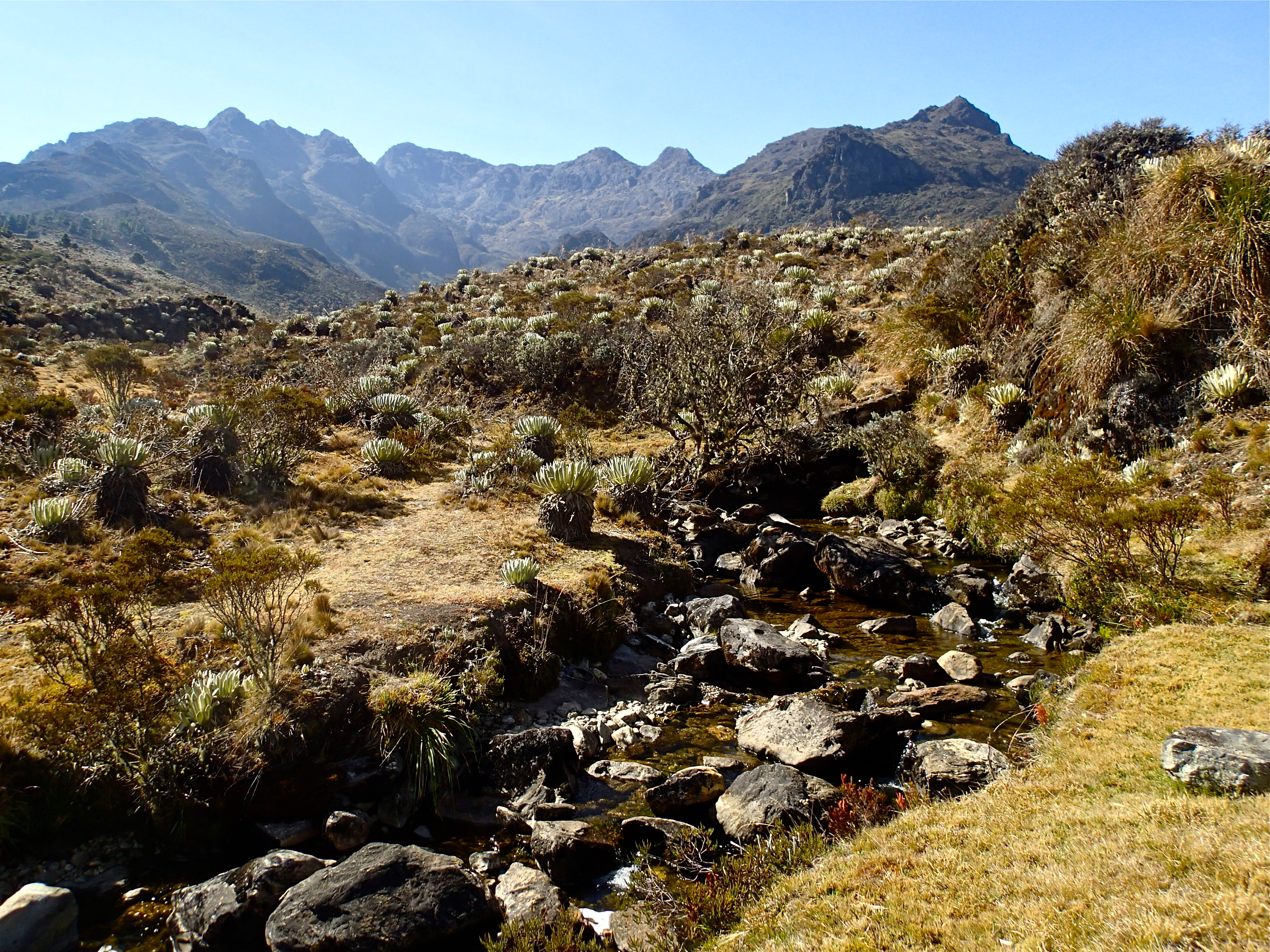
Sierra de Santo Domingo

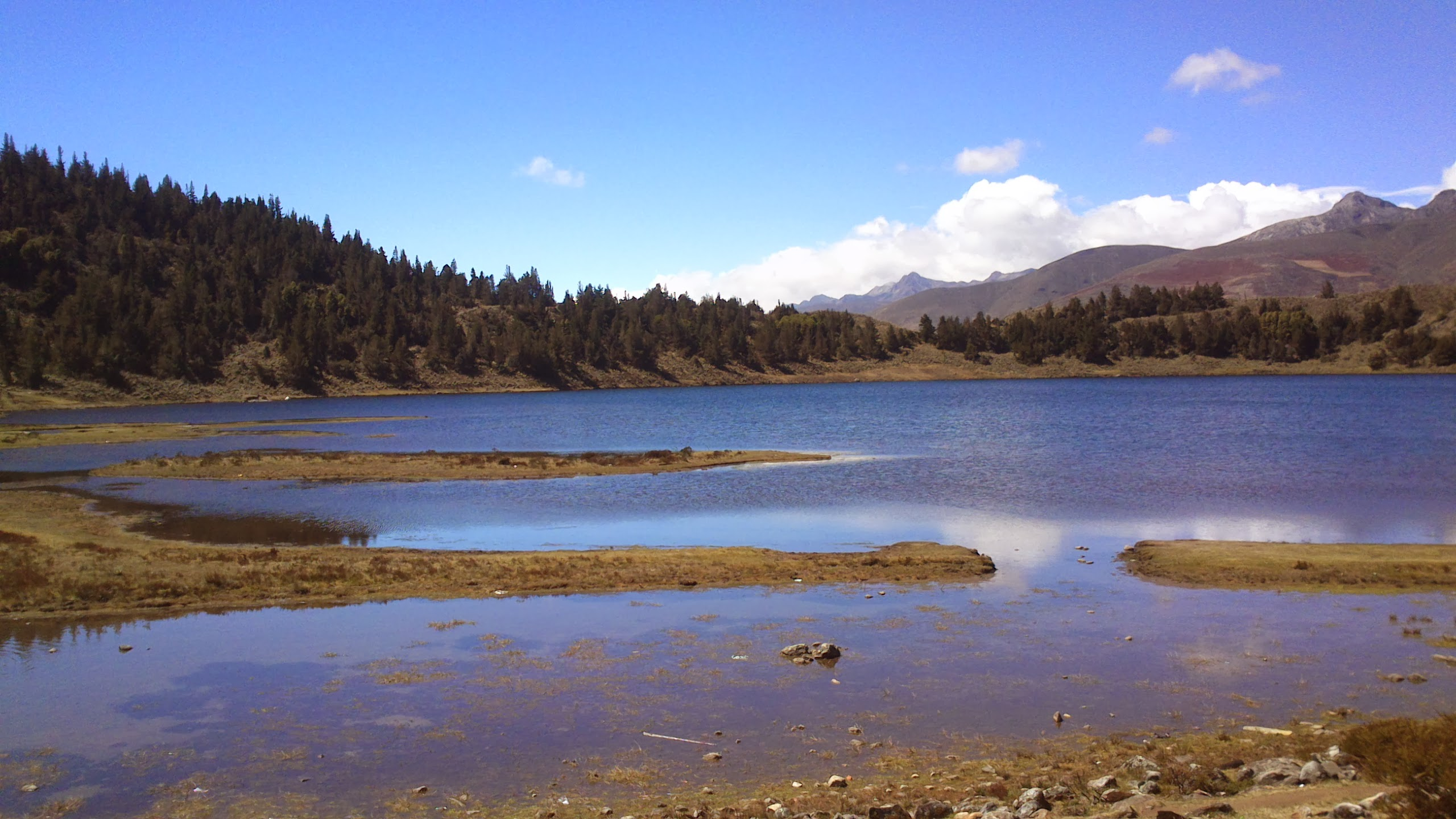
Mucubají lagoon

== See also ==
- Sierra Nevada National Park (Venezuela)
- Sierra de Santo Domingo
- Sierra La Culata
- Merida glaciation
