= Chama River (Venezuela) =

Chama
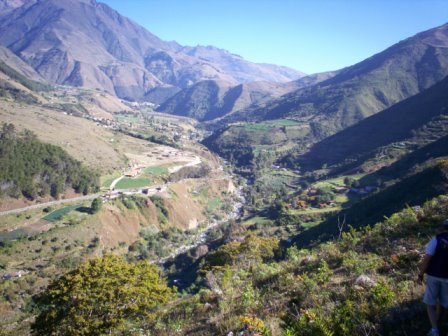
- The upper section of the Chama river near the town of Cacute

Location
- Country: Venezuela
- State: Mérida

Physical characteristics
- Source: Alto de Mifafí
  - location: Apartaderos
  - elevation: 2,500 m (8,200 ft)
- Mouth: Lake Maracaibo
- Length: 180 km (110 mi)

Basin features
- Tributaries
  - right: Albarregas

The Río Chama (English: Chama River) is one of the main rivers of the state of Mérida in Venezuela. The headwaters of the Chama are the Mifafí high lands, in the Andes Range, near the town of Apartaderos. Its outlet is at Lake Maracaibo.

From the headwaters to an elevation of about 2,500 metres (8,200 ft) above sea level, the Chama runs as a steep mountain torrent. As it progresses through the valley, it quickly becomes contaminated with sewage from the many towns that lie along its path. The river continues its journey passing at the foot of the plateau where the city of Mérida sits. Near the town of Ejido, the Albarregas river joins the Chama, dumping all the pollutants from the city of Mérida and thus reaching its peak of contamination. From there, the river continues in steep descent, through a very rocky river bed. This allows the water to become oxygenated and naturally purified from its organic contaminants. At the town of Las Gonzalez, the Chama, while still contaminated, is often used by white water rafters.

Near the town of Estanques, the river enters an approximately 19-kilometre (12 mi) long canyon, characterized by being steep and narrow. This canyon is mostly tropical, providing a natural scenery that contrasts with the Andean set up that mostly characterizes the river. Upon leaving the canyon, the river passes by the second largest city of the state, El Vigía. In the final, short, section of the river, the Chama enters into the state of Zulia and reaches Maracaibo Lake.
