= Diego Caballero =

Spanish merchant and minor Conquistador

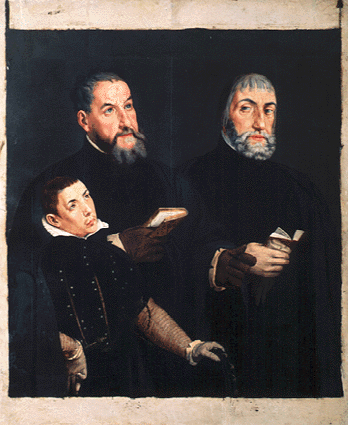
Diego Caballero with his son and his brother Alonso, by Pedro Campaña, Seville Cathedral

Diego Caballero (died 1560) was a Spanish merchant and conquistador in the Caribbean area and in islands off the coast of Venezuela. He organized raids on natives, whom he then enslaved in pearl fishing and other enterprises. He earned money in America, investing in further enterprises throughout the Spanish Empire. He thus became affluent. Furthermore, he held, or purchased, several official posts in the service of King Charles V and in Seville.

== Early life ==
Caballero was born at the end of the fifteenth century in Guadalupe, Spain. He was the son of Pedro Caballero and Catalina de Villegas. In early March 1517, due to the fact that his cousin, Hernando Caballero, was the Mayor of Santo Domingo, he got permission to emigrate to Hispaniola, along with his brother, Alonso.

After using his socially connected background, he was appointed to official posts on the island. He was immediately assigned to the Royal Audiencia of Santo Domingo, the first Royal Court of Justice. Due to this, his commercial and political influence spread along the coast of Tierra Firma, from Santa Marta to the island of Trinidad. He was put in charge of the finances of Hispaniola and was its military governor; he also ran several private enterprises there.

After a time, Diego Caballero resigned from all his official posts and dedicated himself entirely to shipping and commerce around the Atlantic.

== Enslavement of indigenous people ==
Under the supervision of an Oidor (transl. Judge) of the ‘’Royal Audiencia’’, Caballero obtained a license to assemble a fleet and capture indigenous people along the coast of Venezuela between Cape San Román and Cabo de la Vela—an area consisting of several hundred leagues—and in the adjacent islands. He justified the enslavement of indigenous people by claiming that they had refused to convert to Christianity or practiced cannibalism.

It is thought that he gave up the practice of enslavement after a year, either due to being nervous about the Laws of the Indies, which forbade such enslavement, or because of a guilty conscience; he stopped raiding the native people's properties and chasing them on the Venezuelan coast. Meanwhile, the Crown Representatives, Diego Colon and Rodrigo de Figueroa, authorized Juan de Ampies to occupy the Venezuelan coast of Santa Ana de Coro and the islands of Aruba and Curaçao, with the objectives of "protecting" and "pacifying" the native groups, along with teaching them Christianity and a more "organized way of life."

== Ship-owning and career as a merchant ==
Following his enslavement of native people, Caballero managed some pearl fisheries. He also bought four ships and sent his brother to Seville, where he appointed him as his agent and factor. He then began to send wood to Seville, as well as pearls and other precious materials found in the Caribbean islands of Cubagua and Isla Margarita. In return, his ships came back from Spain with textiles, tools, implements, and other products of the country. As the economic and commercial structure developed, Caballero needed people who he could trust to manage his enterprises, such as the voyages of his ships. He hired some of his fellow citizens, including his nephew, Francisco Caballero, whom he appointed to run the pearl fisheries at Cabo de la Vela.

Once he was satisfied with the administration of his businesses by allowing them to be managed by friends and relatives, he signed an agreement with the King, Charles V, Holy Roman Emperor (Charles I of Spain), on 4 August 1525. The agreement permitted the exploration of the territory corresponding to the Venezuela Province, which contained the area between Cape San Román and Cabo de la Vela.

The banking families of the Fuggers and the Welsers, being informed of the success of his enterprises, prevented Caballero from becoming Governor of Venezuela. Before that, Diego increased the size of his fleet of ships, opened further commercial sea routes, and launched new pearl fisheries in Cubagua, Cabo de la Vela, and Panama.

The Church demanded better treatment of the native divers. Diego ordered for his divers to hear Mass before diving and to marry their local women so that they would be less in danger and would not offend God if they had children. He also ordered for his employees to be given different food, plus a half pint of wine a day, shirts, shorts, shoes, and hammocks or straw beds so that they could sleep comfortably, and that they should lack nothing, so that God and man would be served.

== Return to Spain ==
In 1535, he returned to Spain permanently, settling in Seville. He got into the City Council by becoming a Veintiquatro and by using money, thus displaying his wealth. He continued to trade with the Americas and extended his commercial scope into wine, oil, textiles, and slavery across Spain and its empire, which included Flanders.

== Retirement ==
Upon reaching old age, he decided to retire from commercial activity and, with the profits he had made from indigenous people, settled in Seville, where he dedicated himself to charity and the promotion of work that he considered to be good. Every year, in compliance with a promise he had made, he visited the Sanctuary of Guadalupe in Extremadura to thank the Virgin for his current life and to pray for his family and the salvation of his soul.

Recalling his early enslavement of native groups and how he had taken their gold, he asked God to forgive him his sins; he also prayed for the souls of his pearl divers on 27 November 1560.
