= Tomb of Christopher Columbus =

Tomb in the Seville Cathedral in Seville, Andalusia, Spain

Coordinates: 37.3854°N 5.9927°W

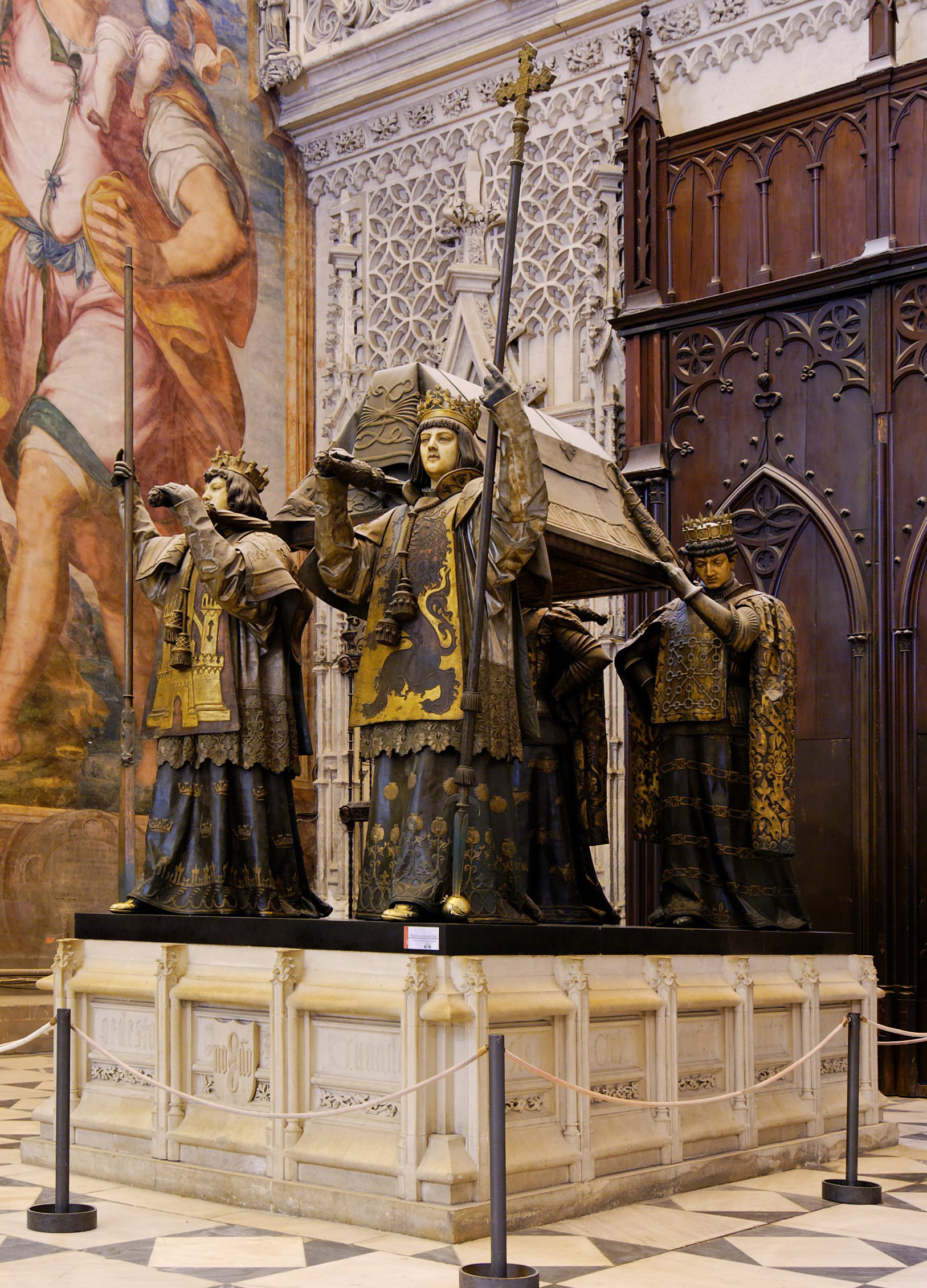
Tomb of Christopher Columbus in the Seville Cathedral (right side of the transept). The inscription on the pedestal reads: "When the island of Cuba emancipated from Mother Spain, Seville obtained the deposit of Columbus's remains, and its city council erected this pedestal."

The Tomb of Christopher Columbus is located in the Seville Cathedral since 1899. Previously, it was located in Valladolid, the Monastery of the Cartuja de Sevilla, in Santo Domingo, and in Havana.

== History ==
=== Valladolid ===
Christopher Columbus died on May 20, 1506, in Valladolid. His death occurred in this city because he was following the itinerant Court of Ferdinand the Catholic. The exact location of his death is unknown, but it could have been either in a modest inn or in the house of a sailor named Gil García where he was a guest. His funeral was held at the Santa María La Antigua in Valladolid, and his body was deposited in the Convent of San Francisco in the city.

=== The Cartuja de Sevilla ===
His son Diego ordered the transfer of Columbus's remains to the Monastery of Santa Maria de las Cuevas, more commonly known as the Cartuja de Sevilla, probably due to Columbus's fondness for this place. The remains were delivered to the Carthusian community of Seville on April 11, 1509. The transfer was carried out by Christopher Columbus's cousin, Juan Antonio Colón, who was also steward for Christopher and his son Diego.

=== Santo Domingo ===
Bartolomé de Las Casas, in his work Historia de las Indias, completed in 1561, was the first to say that the body was transferred from Seville to the main chapel of the Santo Domingo cathedral. Nineteenth-century historian Antonio López Prieto reports that the remains were taken out of the Monastery of Santa María de las Cuevas, carried on a caravel, and transferred to Santo Domingo in 1536. However, Antonio López Prieto bases his account on a 1549 manuscript titled Relación de cosas de La Española, which is lost.

Authors subsequent to Bartolomé de las Casas, such as Diego Ortiz de Zúñiga, in his work Anales, also narrate that the remains were transferred from Seville to Santo Domingo.

The date of 1536 coincides with a document from the monastery that states this was the date of the delivery of the remains, but "delivery" may simply be at a formal level, to the expedition of the delivery document, and is not synonymous with departure, as there are reasons to believe that this departure could have occurred a few years later.

The main chapels of the American cathedrals were considered Royal Patronage, and only people authorized by the king could be buried there. María de Toledo, widow of Columbus's son, as viceroy, cousin of Ferdinand the Catholic, niece of the Duke of Alba, daughter of the commander of León, resident of Santo Domingo, and benefactor of its cathedral, felt sufficiently empowered to request King Charles the transfer of the admiral's remains.

The date of 1536 for the transfer does not seem likely. There are Royal Charters from Charles V ordering the dean and chapter of the Santo Domingo cathedral to bury Christopher Columbus and his son Diego in it. The letters and documents of this process are dated in 1537, 1539, 1540. Furthermore, the construction of the Santo Domingo cathedral was not completed until 1540.

Therefore, if the date of 1536 is called into question, it is not known exactly when the transfer from Seville to Santo Domingo took place.

There is also the coincidence that on July 9, 1544, a fleet left Seville for Santo Domingo. On this fleet was the viceroy María de Toledo. It is likely that she carried the remains of Christopher Columbus and Diego Colón, successor to Christopher and husband of the viceroy, who had died in the Toledo town of La Puebla de Montalbán on February 23, 1526. The remains of her husband, Diego, had also been buried in the Monastery of the Cartuja de Sevilla. On this fleet was also Fray Bartolomé de las Casas, and they arrived in Santo Domingo on September 9. It could also be argued that Columbus's remains were carried to La Española on a voyage from Seville to Santo Domingo made by Luis Colón, grandson of the admiral, in 1540.

Even without knowing the date, it seems clear that he was transferred to America, being buried in the Cathedral of Santo Domingo, where he remained until 1795, when he was transferred to Havana.

=== Transfer to Havana ===
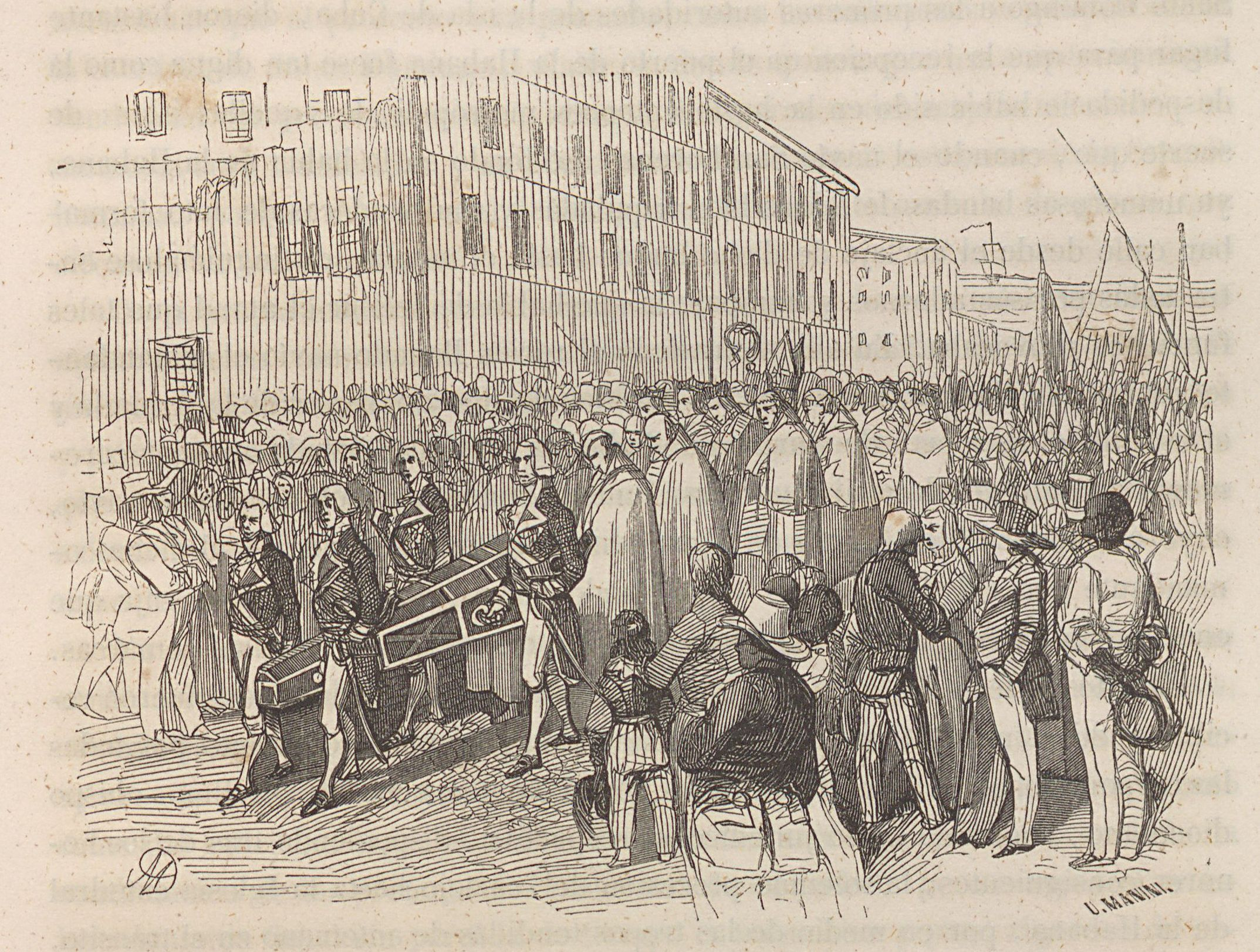
Transfer of Columbus's remains from Santo Domingo (1795)

By the cession of the island to France, signed on July 22, 1795, Spain ceded to the French Republic the part it still owned of the island of La Española. It was the reign of Carlos IV, and the archbishop of Santo Domingo was fray Fernando Portillo y Torres, from a distinguished family and with great academic training. Among the various actions to be carried out on the island, Archbishop Portillo considered one of the most important tasks to be the transfer of Columbus's remains to Havana. He waited for the arrival, on November 8, 1795, of the commander-in-chief of the Spanish forces in the Caribbean, Gabriel de Aristizábal, to promote, apart from evacuating many people, the transfer of the admiral's ashes.

With the support of Archbishop Portillo, General Aristizábal, and the political authorities Joaquín García and José Antonio Urízar, the latter representing the descendant of Columbus, the Duke of Veragua. The exhumation project was set for December 16, 1795, although the transfer was formally approved by royal order on March 5, 1796.

The exhumation took place on December 20, 1795. There is written testimony from all those who participated in the exhumation, as well as two records, an abbreviated and a complete one, drawn up by the notary José Francisco Hidalgo.

=== Columbus remains confirmed ===
In October 2024, researchers from the University of Granada led by forensic scientist José Antonio Lorente claimed they confirmed definitively that the bones lying in the Seville Cathedral belong to Columbus, affirming the findings of an earlier study conducted between 2003 and 2005. The DNA analysis involved comparison with the remains of Columbus's son Fernando and his brother Diego. The results have purportedly solidified the connection between these family members. Lorente mentioned the possibility that some of his bones might also be in the Dominican Republic; Dominican authorities have demanded DNA tests be conducted by an independent party such as the Smithsonian in Washington, however Spanish authorities have refused that proposal.
