= Cerro Tenerife (Venezuela) =

Hill in Venezuela

- Location within Venezuela

Highest point
- Elevation: 2,500 m (8,200 ft)
- Coordinates: 8°05′N 71°33′W

Geography
- Location: State of Mérida, Venezuela

Cerro Tenerife is a hill located in the state of Mérida in Venezuela. The hill has a height of more than 2,500 meters and takes its name from the island of Tenerife in Spain. Next to the hill is the so-called Quebrada Tenerife, an intermittent stream.

== See also ==
- Geography of Venezuela
