= Quebrada Tenerife =

Stream in Venezuela

Coordinates: 8°06′N 71°32′W

Quebrada Tenerife is an intermittent stream near Cerro El Viejo, Cerro Tenerife and Cerro El Guamal. It is located in Mérida State (Venezuela). It takes its name from the island of Tenerife (Spain).

== See also ==
- Geography of Venezuela
