= Diego Ortiz de Zúñiga =

Spanish historian & writer (1636–1680)

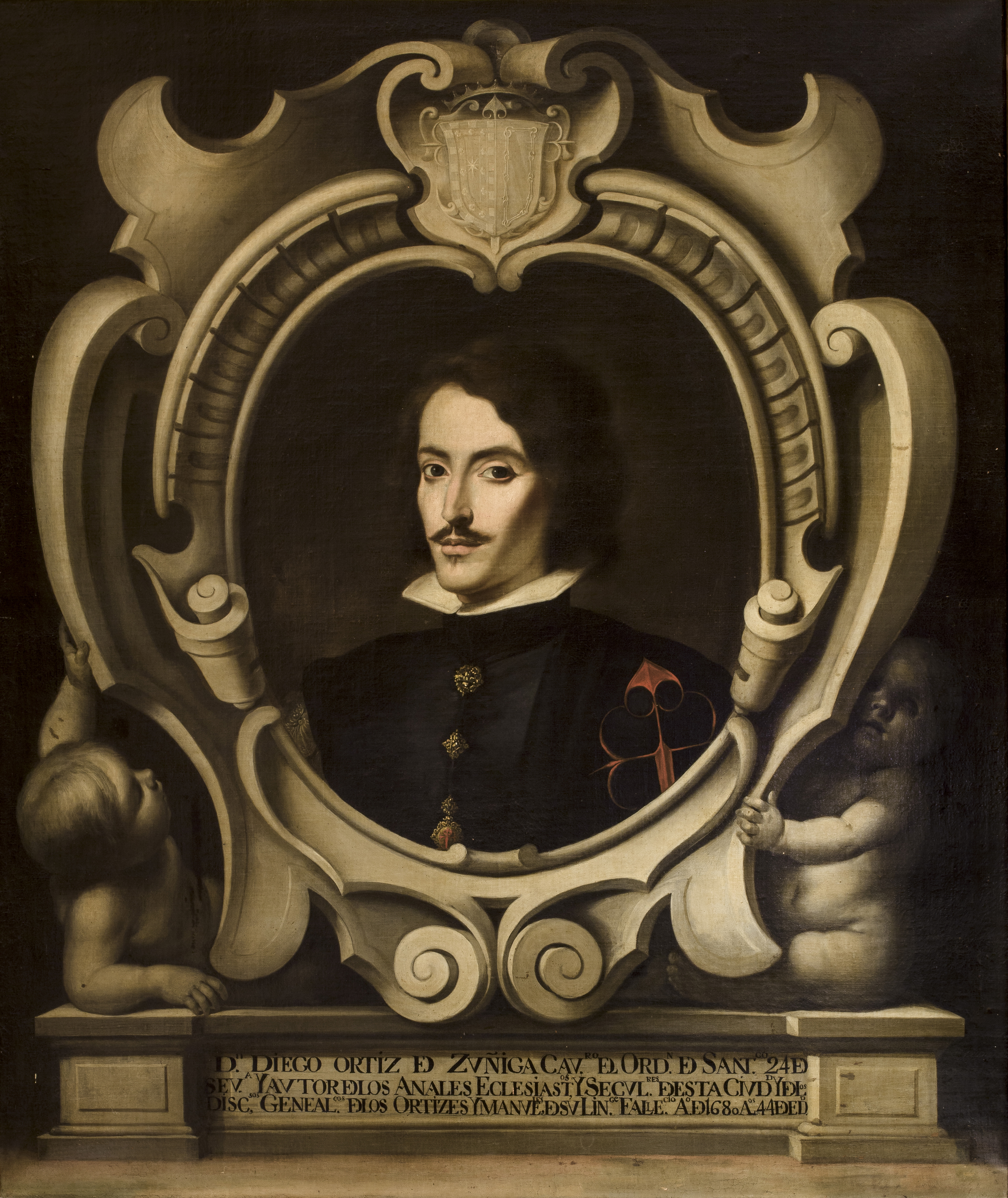
- Born: 1636; Seville, Spain
- Died: September 3, 1680 (aged 43–44)
- Burial place: Church of San Martín (Seville)

Diego Ortiz de Zúñiga (c. 1636 - 3 September 1680) was a Spanish historian, writer and nobleman. He wrote Annales eclesiásticos y seculares de la ciudad de Sevilla a work about the events in Seville from 1246 to 1671.

Diego Ortiz de Zúñiga, born in Seville in 1636 and died in Seville on 3 September 1680, was a Spanish noble, historian of renown and Knight of the Order of Santiago, Venticuatro of Seville for some years, author of The Secular and Ecclesiastical Annals of the very Noble and very Loyal City of Seville, Metropolis of Andalucia, a work in which he recounts the occurrences of the city from 1246 until 1671. Additionally he is the author of The Genealogical Discourse of the Ortizes of Seville and of the work Posterity of Juan de Céspedes, Trece and Commander of the Order of Santiago Monastery.

== Family ==
Son of Juan Ortiz de Zúñiga y Avellaneda, Knight of the Order of Calatrava, Captain of the Infantry, who served on the border of Portugal from 1643 until 1649, married to his first cousin Leanor Luisa del Alcázar y Zúñiga. Diego married in 1657 to Ana María Caballero de Cabrera, daughter of Diego Caballero de Cabrera, Venticuatro of Seville, Knight of the Order of Santiago, and of his wife María Jerónima Caballero de Illescas. His first-born son, Juan Ortiz de Zúñiga, married in 1675 to Urraca Fernández de Santillán y Villegas. Juan was awarded the title of I Marquis of Montefuerte by royal decree on 13 January 1705.

The progenitors of the House of Ortiz de Zúñiga of Seville were Alonso Ortiz (1420-1479), Commander of Azuaga in the Order of Santiago, interned in the temple of Saint Francis of Seville, in the chapel of his grandfathers, (son of Diego Ortiz, butler and guard of King Pedro I of Castille and León, the Cruel, and fifth grandchild of Pedro Ortiz, conqueror of Seville in 1248) and of his wife Mencia de Zúñiga, granddaughter of the famous bishop of Jaén and Plasencia, Gonzalo de Estúñiga y Leiva.

== Historian and Genealogist ==
Diego crossed Caballero in the Order of Santiago in 1640, as one of the Veintiquatro of Seville for a few years. On behalf of the senior relative of the House of the Ortizes of Seville, Alonso Ortiz de Zúñiga, II Marquis of Valencina, made a genealogical work of his lineage entitled Genealogical Discourse of the Ortizes of Seville. The work took into account his genealogy spanning from the conquest of Seville in 1248 to 1680. He had to dispel the gaps in time, conducting investigations using archives and notaries.

The best-known work is Ecclesiastical and Secular Annals of the very Noble and very Loyal City of Seville, Metropolis of Andalusia. It contains his most important memories from the 1246-1671. The book was edited by Juan García Infanzón, at the Imprenta Real, Madrid in 1677, which consists of 823 pages, dedicated to Juan Francisco de la Cerda, VIII Duke of Medinaceli, Adelantado and Notary of Andalusia, Sheriff Major of Seville, descendant of the holy king Ferdinand III of Castile and León, conqueror of Seville in 1248.

In his criticism, José Pellicer de Tovar, Knight of the Order of Santiago, the king's senior chronicler Felipe IV, affirms that Ortiz de Zúñiga carried out his work “having seen and examined with all diligence, not only the Stories of Spain, but the monuments of the Archives of the Holy Metropolitan Church and the Parishes and Regulars and its enlightened Secular Cabildo. They are written with truth, legality, purity of style, without passion or flattery and with the qualities of a serious story”. Affirmation that is also made by Juan Lucas Cortés, of the King's Council and his mayor of House and Court: “In these Annals you will see all the memorable events that occurred in that city in the year and time that it touches them and many particular news, and so far not observed of some other, regarding the Universal History of Spain and of our kings, due to the diligence and work of the author, who did not excuse any, seeing and recognizing all the archives of the church, city, other communities and individuals and also of scriptures and privileges of them, with which in addition to the security and truth with that they are adjusted…”

He also wrote and had printed Posteriority of Juan de Céspedes, Trece and Commander of the Monastery in the Order of Santiago and began to write his work Theater Genealogical of the Céspedes of Seville. Diego Ortiz de Zúñiga failed to finish this last work, dying in 1680 at the age of 44. He was buried in the chapel of the Church of Saint Martin in Seville.

The city council of Seville gave the name of Ortiz de Zúñiga to the Colegio Público, located on Avenida Ramón y Cajal Colegio Público Ortiz de Zúñiga.

The National Library of Spain preserves his works: Ecclesiastic and Secular Annals of Seville and Genealogical Discourse of the Ortizes of Seville.
