= Veintiquatro =

A veinticuatro or 'Caballero Veintiquatro' (Knight/Gentleman Veintiquatro) was an official title used in several Andalusian cities in pre-modern Spain, notably Úbeda, Baeza, Jaén, Córdoba, Seville, Jerez de la Frontera and Granada. The office or post itself was referred to as veintiquatría, and was largely equivalent to the role of an alderman or councilor in English local government. Only men of noble birth could be appointed as veintiquatro, and like many official positions, could be bought and sold among the Hidalgo noble class.

Many of the Conquistadors, and the merchants who established the Spanish Empire in America (Diego Caballero for example), were Caballeros Veintiquatro. They either bought the post or were appointed to it as this allowed the man to display a new position in Spanish society.

The veintiquatro name apparently derived from the original number (24) of members of a town council, but this number varied with time and location. The duties of veintiquatros included deciding and collecting local taxes, regulating and inspecting markets, shipping, the relief of poverty, and inspecting prisons.
