= Geography of Venezuela =

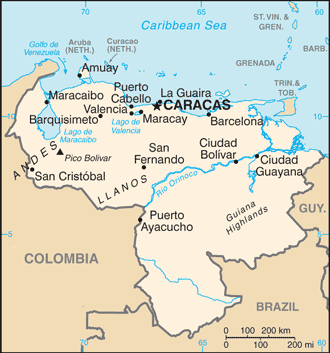
- Continent: South America
- Region: Caribbean
- Coordinates: 8°00′N 66°00′W
- Area: Ranked 32nd
  - Total: 912,050 km^{2} (352,140 sq mi)
  - Land: 96.71%
  - Water: 3.29%
- Coastline: 2,800 km (1,700 mi)
- Borders: 5,267 km (3,273 mi)
- Highest point: Pico Bolívar; 4,978 m (16,332 ft)
- Lowest point: Caribbean Sea; 0 metres (0 ft)
- Exclusive economic zone: 471,507 km^{2} (182,050 mi^{2})

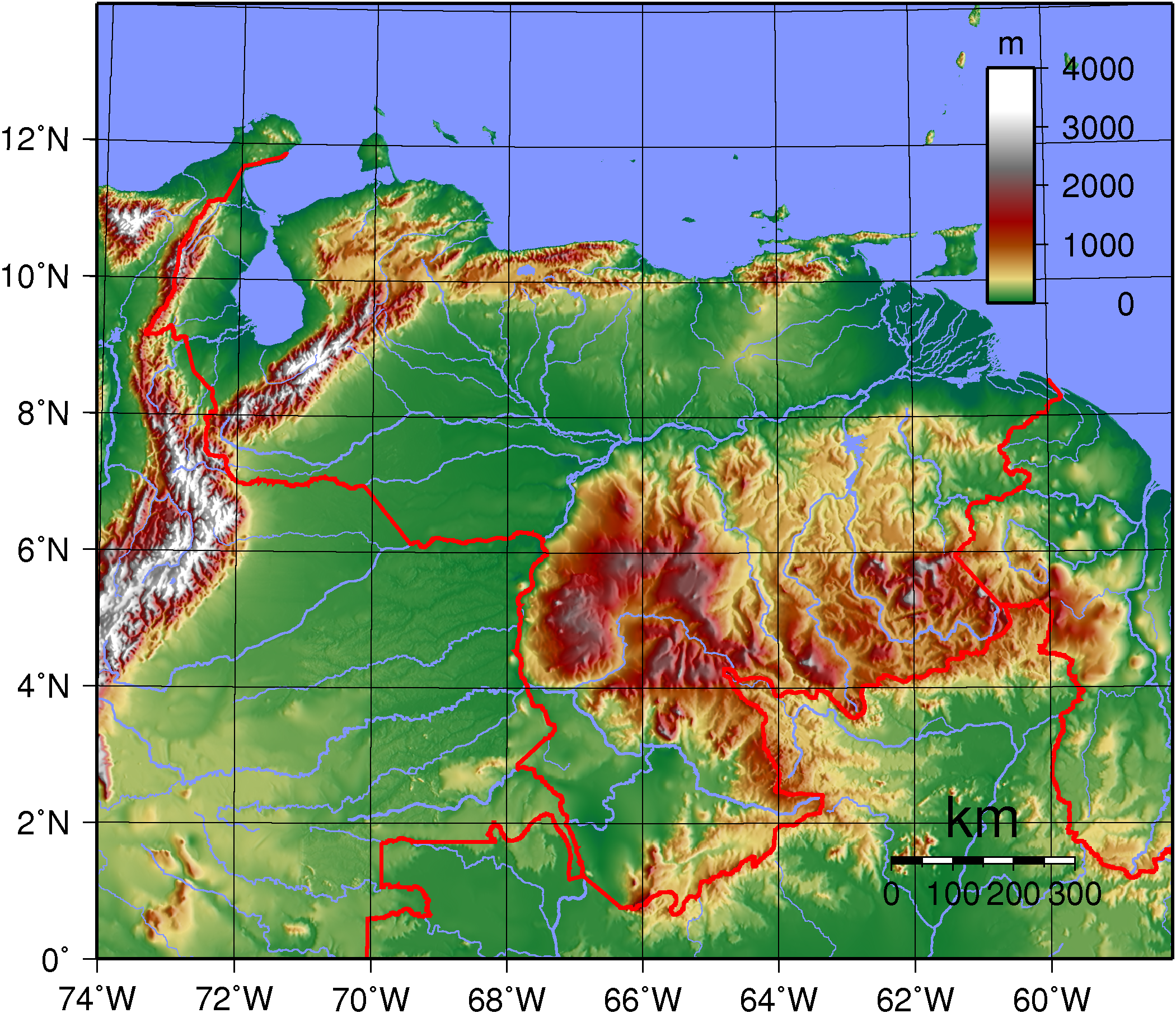
A topographic map of Venezuela

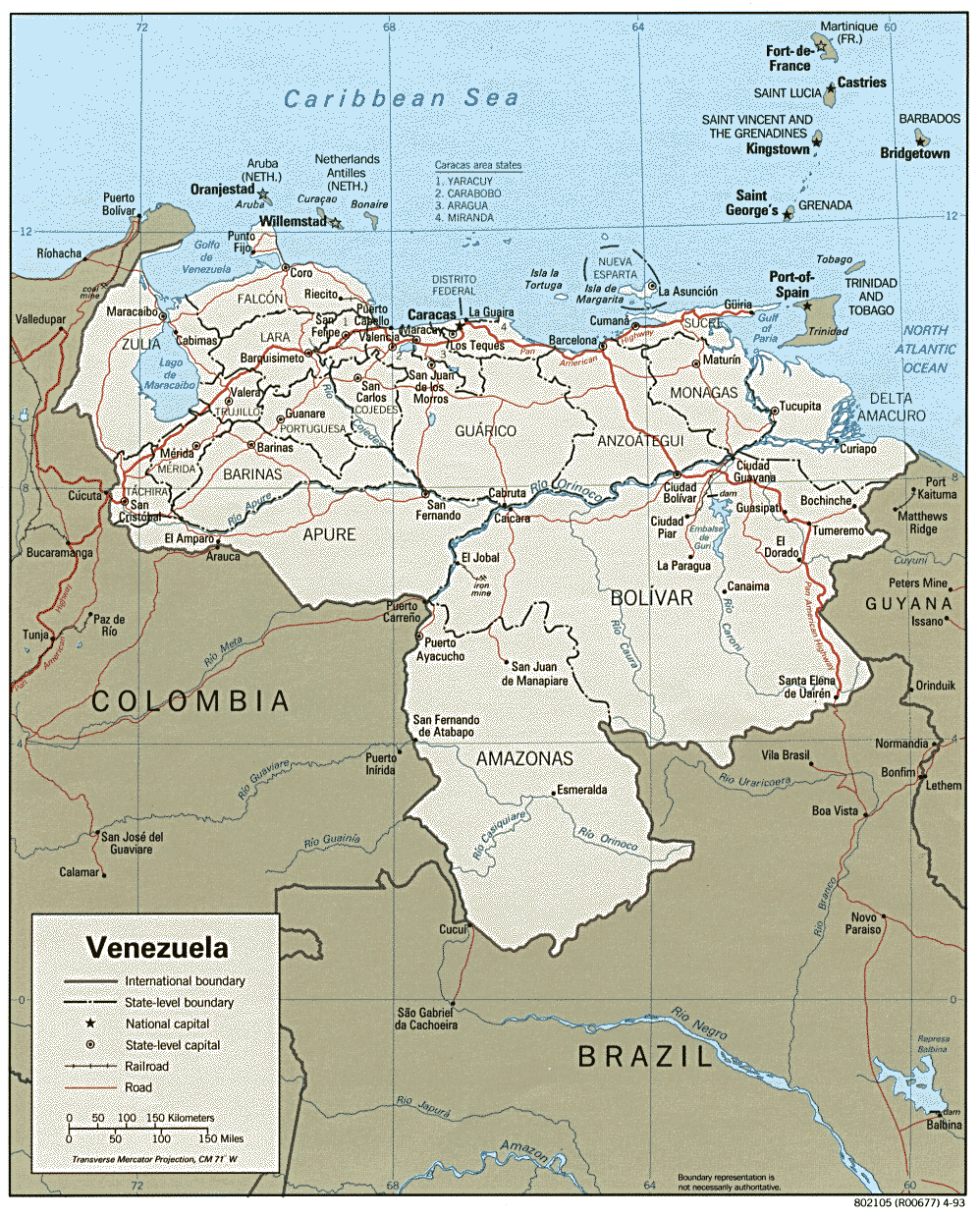
A political map of Venezuela

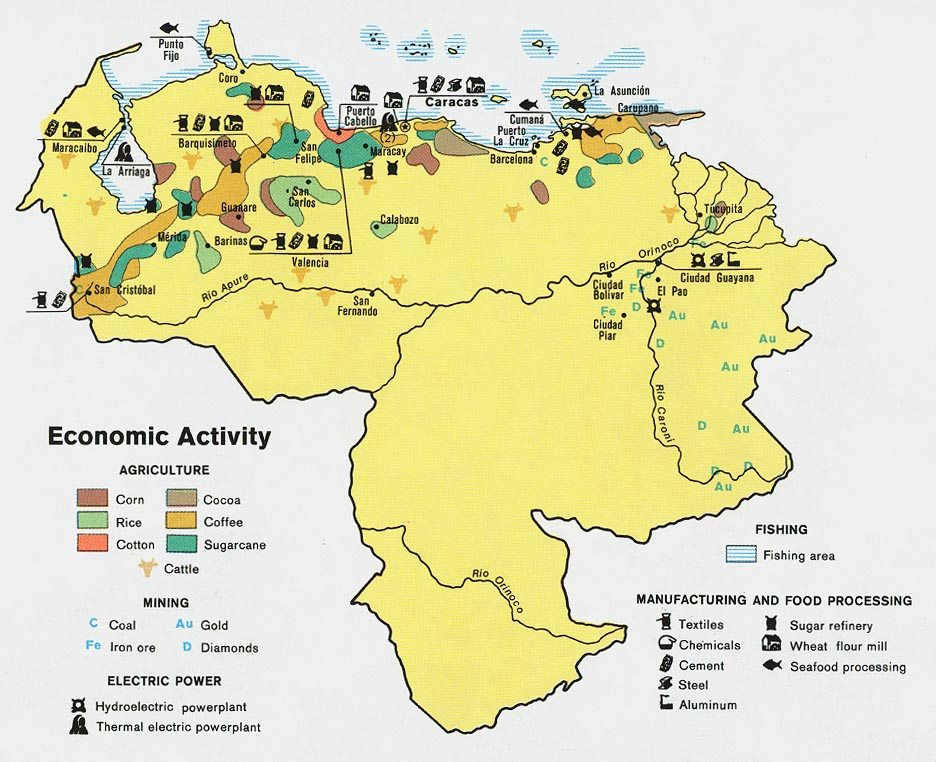
An economic activity map of Venezuela, 1972

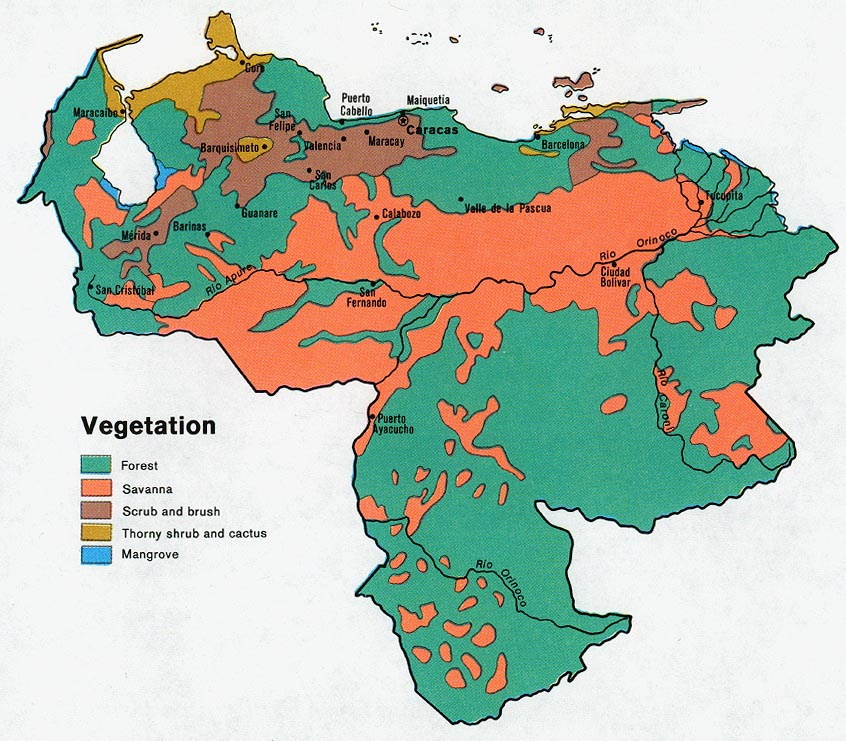
A vegetation map of Venezuela, 1972

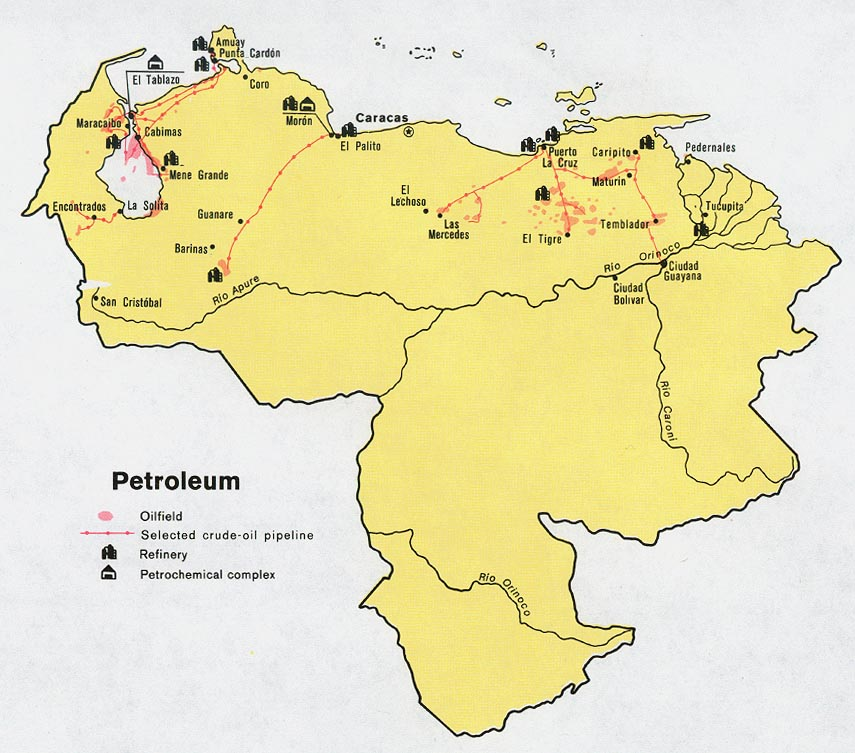
A petroleum map of Venezuela, 1972

Venezuela is a country in South America, bordering the Caribbean Sea and the North Atlantic Ocean, between Colombia and Guyana. It is situated on major sea and air routes linking North and South America. Located at the northernmost end of South America, Venezuela has a total area of 912,050 km^{2} (352,140 mi^{2}) and a land area of 882,050 km^{2} (340,560 mi^{2}). It is the 32nd largest country and is slightly smaller than Egypt, or half the size of Mexico. Shaped roughly like an inverted triangle, the country has a 2,800 km (1,700 mi) long coastline.

It is bound on the north by the Caribbean Sea and the Atlantic Ocean, on the east by Guyana, on the south by Brazil, and on the west by Colombia. It has the 55th largest Exclusive Economic Zone of 471,507 km^{2} (182,050 mi^{2}). Its maritime territory borders Trinidad and Tobago, Dominica, the Dominican Republic, Grenada, St. Kitts and Nevis, St. Vincent and the Grenadines, France, the United Kingdom, the Netherlands, and the United States. The Guyana–Venezuela territorial dispute has continued since the nineteenth century, with Venezuelan claiming a territory it calls "Guayana Esequiba", which is currently controlled by Guyana.

== Topography ==
Most observers describe Venezuela in terms of four fairly well-defined regions: the Maracaibo lowlands in the northwest, the northern mountains extending in a broad east–west arc from the Colombian border along the Caribbean Sea, the wide Orinoco plains (Llanos) in central Venezuela, and rank highly dissected Guiana highlands in the southeast.

The Maracaibo lowlands form a large spoon-shaped oval bounded by mountains on three sides and open to the Caribbean on the north. The area is remarkably flat with only a gentle slope toward the center and away from the mountains that border the region. Lake Maracaibo occupies much of the lower-lying territory. Areas around the southern part of Lake Maracaibo are swampy, and, despite the rich agricultural land and significant petroleum deposits, the area was still thinly populated as of 1990.

The mountains bordering the Caribbean Sea are actually the northeasternmost extension of the Andes chain. Broken by several gaps, these high mountains have peaks over 4,500 metres (14,800 ft); the fertile valleys between the ranges contain most of Venezuela's population, industry, and agriculture. The discontinuous westernmost range runs along the Colombian border and is the least densely populated part of this region. The ranges southeast of Lake Maracaibo contain some of the highest peaks in the country (Pico Bolivar reaches 4,978 m (16,332 ft)), a few of which are snowcapped year-round.

A broad gap separates this mountainous area from another rugged pair of ranges that parallel the north-central coast. The series of valleys between these two parallel ranges constitute the core area of the country; as the site of burgeoning metropolitan Caracas, this comparatively small area hosts the country's densest population, the most intensive agriculture, and the best transportation network. Another broad gap separates this area from the easternmost group of mountains, a series of dissected hills and uplands that rise steeply from the Caribbean and extend eastward almost to Trinidad.

The great expanse of lowlands known as the Orinoco plains extend westward from the Caribbean coast to the Colombian border between the northern mountains and the Rio Orinoco. This region is commonly known as the llanos, although it also contains large stretches of swampland in the Orinoco Delta and near the Colombian border. The area slopes gradually away from the highland areas that surround it; elevations in the llanos never exceed 200 metres (660 ft). North of the Rio Apure, rivers flowing out of the northern mountains cut shallow valleys, leaving eroded ridges that give the land a gently rolling appearance. South of the Apure, the terrain is flatter and elevations lower.

One of the oldest landforms in South America, the Guiana highlands rise almost immediately south and east of the Rio Orinoco. Erosion has created unusual formations in this region. Making up over half of the country, the highlands consist primarily of plateau areas scored by swiftly running tributaries of the Orinoco. The most conspicuous topographical feature of the region is the Gran Sabana, a large, deeply eroded high plateau that rises from surrounding areas in abrupt cliffs up to 800 metres (2,600 ft). Above the rolling surface of the Gran Sabana, massive, flat-topped bluffs emerge; many of these bluffs (referred to as tepuis by the Venezuelans) reach considerable altitudes. The most famous tepui contains Angel Falls, the world's highest waterfall.

== Climate ==
Although Venezuela lies wholly within the tropics, its climate varies from tropical humid to alpine, depending on the elevation, topography, and the direction and intensity of prevailing winds. Seasonal variations are marked less by temperature than by rainfall. Most of Venezuela has a distinct rainy season. The rainy period, May to November, is commonly referred to as winter and the remainder of the year as summer.

Average yearly rainfall amounts in the lowlands and plains range from an arid 180 mm (7 in) in the Paraguaná Peninsula – the driest part of South America outside the Arid Diagonal – to around 1,000 mm (39 in) in the Orinoco Delta and 2,200 mm (87 in) or more in Los Llanos and Amazonas. Rainfall in mountainous areas varies considerably. Sheltered valleys receive little rain, but slopes exposed to the northeast trade winds experience heavy rainfall. Caracas averages 800 mm (31 in) of precipitation annually, with very little rain falling from December to April.

Venezuela falls into four temperature zones based primarily on elevation. In the tropical zone—below 800 m (2,600 ft)—temperatures are hot, with yearly averages ranging between 26 and 28 °C (79 and 82 °F). The temperate zone ranges between 800 and 2,000 m (2,600 and 6,600 ft) with averages from 12 to 25 °C (54 to 77 °F). Many of Venezuela's cities, including the capital, lie in this region. Colder conditions with temperatures from 9 to 11 °C (48 to 52 °F) are found in the cool zone between 2,000 and 3,000 m (6,600 and 9,800 ft). Pastureland and permanent snowfield with yearly averages below 8 °C (46 °F) cover land above 3,000 m (9,800 ft) in the high mountain areas known as the páramos.

=== Climate data ===
Climate data for Caracas (Köppen Aw/Cwb)
Month	Jan	Feb	Mar	Apr	May	Jun	Jul	Aug	Sep	Oct	Nov	Dec	Year
Record high °C (°F)	31.9 (89.4)	34.1 (93.4)	35.3 (95.5)	33.5 (92.3)	34.4 (93.9)	32.8 (91.0)	33.6 (92.5)	31.5 (88.7)	32.2 (90.0)	31.4 (88.5)	31.2 (88.2)	30.8 (87.4)	35.3 (95.5)
Mean daily maximum °C (°F)	23.3 (73.9)	23.6 (74.5)	24.3 (75.7)	25.0 (77.0)	25.8 (78.4)	26.0 (78.8)	25.5 (77.9)	25.8 (78.4)	25.5 (77.9)	25.2 (77.4)	24.6 (76.3)	23.8 (74.8)	24.9 (76.8)
Daily mean °C (°F)	19.6 (67.3)	19.7 (67.5)	20.2 (68.4)	21.2 (70.2)	22.0 (71.6)	22.0 (71.6)	21.7 (71.1)	21.9 (71.4)	21.9 (71.4)	21.8 (71.2)	21.3 (70.3)	20.2 (68.4)	21.1 (70.0)
Mean daily minimum °C (°F)	15.9 (60.6)	15.8 (60.4)	16.0 (60.8)	17.5 (63.5)	18.2 (64.8)	18.1 (64.6)	17.9 (64.2)	18.1 (64.6)	18.3 (64.9)	18.4 (65.1)	18.0 (64.4)	16.5 (61.7)	17.4 (63.3)
Record low °C (°F)	7.1 (44.8)	10.9 (51.6)	11.4 (52.5)	12.5 (54.5)	13.1 (55.6)	14.9 (58.8)	14.1 (57.4)	14.3 (57.7)	15.5 (59.9)	13.1 (55.6)	11.9 (53.4)	10.0 (50.0)	7.1 (44.8)
Average rainfall mm (inches)	15.3 (0.60)	13.2 (0.52)	11.4 (0.45)	59.2 (2.33)	81.7 (3.22)	134.1 (5.28)	118.4 (4.66)	123.8 (4.87)	115.4 (4.54)	126.3 (4.97)	72.6 (2.86)	41.4 (1.63)	912.8 (35.94)
Average rainy days (≥ 1.0 mm)	6	4	3	7	13	19	19	18	15	15	13	10	142
Average relative humidity (%)	73.7	74.2	73.0	76.3	75.4	75.1	74.1	74.0	74.9	74.7	73.7	74.7	74.5
Mean monthly sunshine hours	229.4	217.5	235.6	183.0	182.9	183.0	210.8	217.0	213.0	210.8	210.0	213.9	2,506.9
Source 1: Instituto Nacional de Meteorología e Hidrología (INAMEH)
Source 2: World Meteorological Organization (rainfall data), Hong Kong Observatory (sun only), NOAA(extremes)

Climate data for Maracaibo (Köppen BSh)
Month	Jan	Feb	Mar	Apr	May	Jun	Jul	Aug	Sep	Oct	Nov	Dec	Year
Record high °C (°F)	36.4 (97.5)	39.4 (102.9)	39.9 (103.8)	39.6 (103.3)	46.8 (116.2)	39.0 (102.2)	39.8 (103.6)	38.1 (100.6)	37.0 (98.6)	36.6 (97.9)	36.3 (97.3)	36.8 (98.2)	43.6 (110.5)
Mean daily maximum °C (°F)	32.5 (90.5)	32.8 (91.0)	33.1 (91.6)	33.1 (91.6)	33.1 (91.6)	33.6 (92.5)	36.1 (97.0)	35.2 (95.4)	33.6 (92.5)	32.5 (90.5)	32.4 (90.3)	32.5 (90.5)	35.1 (95.2)
Daily mean °C (°F)	27.7 (81.9)	28.0 (82.4)	28.6 (83.5)	29.0 (84.2)	29.1 (84.4)	29.3 (84.7)	29.5 (85.1)	29.6 (85.3)	29.1 (84.4)	28.3 (82.9)	28.3 (82.9)	27.9 (82.2)	28.7 (83.7)
Mean daily minimum °C (°F)	22.8 (73.0)	23.2 (73.8)	24.1 (75.4)	24.8 (76.6)	25.0 (77.0)	24.9 (76.8)	24.9 (76.8)	24.9 (76.8)	24.6 (76.3)	24.1 (75.4)	24.1 (75.4)	23.9 (75.0)	24.2 (75.6)
Record low °C (°F)	19.2 (66.6)	18.8 (65.8)	20.4 (68.7)	20.7 (69.3)	20.5 (68.9)	20.2 (68.4)	21.0 (69.8)	20.2 (68.4)	20.2 (68.4)	20.0 (68.0)	20.6 (69.1)	18.9 (66.0)	18.8 (65.8)
Average rainfall mm (inches)	5.1 (0.20)	2.7 (0.11)	5.9 (0.23)	52.1 (2.05)	66.8 (2.63)	55.4 (2.18)	26.5 (1.04)	60.0 (2.36)	104.0 (4.09)	114.4 (4.50)	70.6 (2.78)	16.9 (0.67)	580.4 (22.85)
Average rainy days (≥ 1.0 mm)	0.6	0.3	0.6	3.6	6.1	6.7	3.6	5.8	8.1	9.2	5.3	1.7	51.6
Average relative humidity (%)	69.0	68.5	68.0	71.5	73.5	71.0	69.0	69.5	72.0	75.0	73.0	72.0	71.0
Mean monthly sunshine hours	300.0	279.0	286.0	257.0	243.0	253.0	301.0	279.0	272.5	282.9	258.0	272.7	3,284.1
Source 1: Instituto Nacional de Meteorología e Hidrología (INAMEH)
Source 2: NOAA (extremes and sun 1961–1990), World Meteorological Organization (precipitation, 1961–1990)

Climate data for Valencia (Köppen) (Aw)
Month	Jan	Feb	Mar	Apr	May	Jun	Jul	Aug	Sep	Oct	Nov	Dec	Year
Record high °C (°F)	37.1 (98.8)	39.3 (102.7)	38.9 (102.0)	38.7 (101.7)	38.1 (100.6)	35.5 (95.9)	35.6 (96.1)	35.6 (96.1)	36.2 (97.2)	36.0 (96.8)	37.6 (99.7)	36.4 (97.5)	39.3 (102.7)
Mean daily maximum °C (°F)	32.3 (90.1)	32.8 (91.0)	33.5 (92.3)	33.2 (91.8)	32.5 (90.5)	31.5 (88.7)	31.1 (88.0)	31.0 (87.8)	31.8 (89.2)	32.0 (89.6)	32.1 (89.8)	32.2 (90.0)	32.2 (90.0)
Daily mean °C (°F)	24.9 (76.8)	25.3 (77.5)	26.1 (79.0)	26.4 (79.5)	26.3 (79.3)	25.5 (77.9)	24.9 (76.8)	24.8 (76.6)	25.2 (77.4)	25.4 (77.7)	25.5 (77.9)	25.3 (77.5)	25.5 (77.9)
Mean daily minimum °C (°F)	20.0 (68.0)	20.5 (68.9)	21.4 (70.5)	22.1 (71.8)	22.4 (72.3)	21.7 (71.1)	21.2 (70.2)	21.2 (70.2)	21.5 (70.7)	21.6 (70.9)	21.4 (70.5)	20.9 (69.6)	21.3 (70.3)
Record low °C (°F)	14.6 (58.3)	16.0 (60.8)	15.9 (60.6)	17.5 (63.5)	18.0 (64.4)	17.5 (63.5)	16.7 (62.1)	15.2 (59.4)	16.4 (61.5)	16.5 (61.7)	17.0 (62.6)	13.8 (56.8)	13.8 (56.8)
Average rainfall mm (inches)	55.1 (2.17)	32.5 (1.28)	26.4 (1.04)	71.8 (2.83)	116.0 (4.57)	135.9 (5.35)	183.1 (7.21)	187.1 (7.37)	185.1 (7.29)	194.9 (7.67)	130.6 (5.14)	86.0 (3.39)	1,404.5 (55.30)
Average rainy days (≥ 1.0 mm)	2.3	1.5	2.1	6.0	9.1	12.5	14.3	14.6	12.3	12.1	7.8	3.9	98.5
Source: NOAA

Climate data for Barquisimeto (Köppen BSh)
Month	Jan	Feb	Mar	Apr	May	Jun	Jul	Aug	Sep	Oct	Nov	Dec	Year
Record high °C (°F)	33.9 (93.0)	35.4 (95.7)	37.5 (99.5)	35.6 (96.1)	35.6 (96.1)	34.0 (93.2)	32.8 (91.0)	33.8 (92.8)	34.0 (93.2)	34.1 (93.4)	33.6 (92.5)	32.8 (91.0)	37.5 (99.5)
Mean daily maximum °C (°F)	29.5 (85.1)	30.3 (86.5)	31.1 (88.0)	30.4 (86.7)	29.6 (85.3)	28.9 (84.0)	28.8 (83.8)	29.7 (85.5)	30.2 (86.4)	30.2 (86.4)	29.8 (85.6)	29.1 (84.4)	29.8 (85.6)
Daily mean °C (°F)	24.1 (75.4)	24.7 (76.5)	25.4 (77.7)	25.5 (77.9)	25.1 (77.2)	24.6 (76.3)	24.3 (75.7)	24.8 (76.6)	25.2 (77.4)	25.2 (77.4)	24.9 (76.8)	24.1 (75.4)	24.8 (76.6)
Mean daily minimum °C (°F)	18.6 (65.5)	19.0 (66.2)	19.6 (67.3)	20.6 (69.1)	20.6 (69.1)	20.2 (68.4)	19.8 (67.6)	19.9 (67.8)	20.1 (68.2)	20.2 (68.4)	20.0 (68.0)	19.1 (66.4)	19.8 (67.6)
Record low °C (°F)	13.4 (56.1)	13.2 (55.8)	12.6 (54.7)	15.2 (59.4)	16.5 (61.7)	16.1 (61.0)	16.4 (61.5)	15.4 (59.7)	15.4 (59.7)	15.1 (59.2)	15.0 (59.0)	13.8 (56.8)	12.6 (54.7)
Average rainfall mm (inches)	9 (0.4)	8 (0.3)	14 (0.6)	65 (2.6)	75 (3.0)	78 (3.1)	77 (3.0)	53 (2.1)	39 (1.5)	49 (1.9)	48 (1.9)	25 (1.0)	540 (21.3)
Average rainy days (≥ 1.0 mm)	1.5	1.2	1.7	5.5	7.9	12.0	10.6	8.1	5.8	6.1	6.4	4.0	70.8
Average relative humidity (%)	68.5	66.5	65.5	70.0	74.0	75.0	74.5	73.0	72.5	73.0	73.0	72.0	71.5
Mean monthly sunshine hours	260.4	235.2	241.8	183.0	192.2	201.0	232.5	241.8	228.0	226.3	222.0	248.0	2,712.2
Source 1: Instituto Nacional de Meteorología e Hidrología (INAMEH)
Source 2: NOAA (extremes, precipitation, and sun)

Climate data for Puerto Ayacucho (Köppen Am)
Month	Jan	Feb	Mar	Apr	May	Jun	Jul	Aug	Sep	Oct	Nov	Dec	Year
Record high °C (°F)	38.8 (101.8)	39.6 (103.3)	40.2 (104.4)	39.0 (102.2)	38.6 (101.5)	35.2 (95.4)	35.0 (95.0)	35.8 (96.4)	36.4 (97.5)	37.6 (99.7)	36.8 (98.2)	37.4 (99.3)	40.2 (104.4)
Mean daily maximum °C (°F)	34.4 (93.9)	35.4 (95.7)	35.5 (95.9)	33.5 (92.3)	31.5 (88.7)	30.4 (86.7)	30.3 (86.5)	31.0 (87.8)	31.9 (89.4)	32.7 (90.9)	33.2 (91.8)	33.5 (92.3)	32.8 (91.0)
Daily mean °C (°F)	28.6 (83.5)	29.3 (84.7)	29.6 (85.3)	28.6 (83.5)	27.3 (81.1)	26.5 (79.7)	26.3 (79.3)	26.7 (80.1)	27.2 (81.0)	27.7 (81.9)	28.0 (82.4)	28.1 (82.6)	27.8 (82.0)
Mean daily minimum °C (°F)	22.7 (72.9)	23.2 (73.8)	23.7 (74.7)	23.6 (74.5)	23.1 (73.6)	22.6 (72.7)	22.3 (72.1)	22.4 (72.3)	22.5 (72.5)	22.7 (72.9)	22.8 (73.0)	22.7 (72.9)	22.9 (73.2)
Record low °C (°F)	17.8 (64.0)	18.4 (65.1)	18.3 (64.9)	19.7 (67.5)	17.2 (63.0)	19.3 (66.7)	18.1 (64.6)	18.3 (64.9)	18.3 (64.9)	19.3 (66.7)	19.9 (67.8)	17.5 (63.5)	17.2 (63.0)
Average rainfall mm (inches)	31 (1.2)	36 (1.4)	74 (2.9)	163 (6.4)	311 (12.2)	408 (16.1)	398 (15.7)	298 (11.7)	198 (7.8)	183 (7.2)	127 (5.0)	42 (1.7)	2,269 (89.3)
Average rainy days (≥ 1.0 mm)	2.8	2.9	5.1	11.3	18.2	22.3	22.4	19.5	14.8	13.9	9.4	5.0	147.6
Average relative humidity (%)	72.4	70.3	72.3	72.8	74.3	75.8	74.5	72.1	71.3	73.4	72.8	72.8	72.9
Mean monthly sunshine hours	275.9	252.0	248.0	177.0	151.9	129.0	145.7	155.0	168.0	201.5	222.0	260.4	2,386.4
Source 1: Instituto Nacional de Meteorología e Hidrología (INAMEH)
Source 2: NOAA (extremes, precipitation, and sun)

Climate data for Coro (Köppen BWh)
Month	Jan	Feb	Mar	Apr	May	Jun	Jul	Aug	Sep	Oct	Nov	Dec	Year
Record high °C (°F)	37.8 (100.0)	35.9 (96.6)	37.5 (99.5)	43.6 (110.5)	39.1 (102.4)	38.2 (100.8)	38.5 (101.3)	39.5 (103.1)	38.5 (101.3)	38.1 (100.6)	36.8 (98.2)	36.8 (98.2)	43.6 (110.5)
Mean daily maximum °C (°F)	31.3 (88.3)	31.7 (89.1)	32.2 (90.0)	32.6 (90.7)	33.5 (92.3)	33.8 (92.8)	33.5 (92.3)	34.2 (93.6)	34.4 (93.9)	33.5 (92.3)	32.4 (90.3)	31.4 (88.5)	32.9 (91.2)
Daily mean °C (°F)	27.5 (81.5)	27.8 (82.0)	28.3 (82.9)	28.8 (83.8)	29.6 (85.3)	29.8 (85.6)	29.5 (85.1)	30.0 (86.0)	30.1 (86.2)	29.4 (84.9)	28.6 (83.5)	27.7 (81.9)	28.9 (84.0)
Mean daily minimum °C (°F)	23.6 (74.5)	23.8 (74.8)	24.3 (75.7)	24.9 (76.8)	25.6 (78.1)	25.7 (78.3)	25.5 (77.9)	25.7 (78.3)	25.8 (78.4)	25.3 (77.5)	24.8 (76.6)	23.9 (75.0)	24.9 (76.8)
Record low °C (°F)	19.5 (67.1)	19.0 (66.2)	20.5 (68.9)	21.1 (70.0)	20.4 (68.7)	21.8 (71.2)	20.5 (68.9)	21.6 (70.9)	20.5 (68.9)	20.7 (69.3)	20.8 (69.4)	18.9 (66.0)	18.9 (66.0)
Average rainfall mm (inches)	22.0 (0.87)	16.1 (0.63)	9.1 (0.36)	17.0 (0.67)	28.8 (1.13)	26.9 (1.06)	36.7 (1.44)	29.2 (1.15)	36.3 (1.43)	54.2 (2.13)	52.1 (2.05)	54.1 (2.13)	382.5 (15.06)
Average rainy days (≥ 1.0 mm)	2.5	1.6	1.2	1.5	2.6	3.2	4.3	3.5	3.7	5.4	5.8	4.8	40.1
Average relative humidity (%)	69.0	68.5	67.0	69.0	68.5	68.0	67.5	67.0	67.0	70.5	72.0	71.0	68.8
Mean monthly sunshine hours	291.4	268.8	288.3	234.0	248.0	255.0	285.2	288.3	261.0	251.1	252.0	266.6	3,189.7
Source 1: Instituto Nacional de Meteorología e Hidrología (INAMEH)
Source 2: NOAA (extremes, rainy days, and sun)

Climate data for Mérida (Köppen Am/Cwb)
Month	Jan	Feb	Mar	Apr	May	Jun	Jul	Aug	Sep	Oct	Nov	Dec	Year
Record high °C (°F)	28.8 (83.8)	30.0 (86.0)	31.2 (88.2)	31.7 (89.1)	30.8 (87.4)	30.3 (86.5)	30.2 (86.4)	31.0 (87.8)	30.5 (86.9)	29.2 (84.6)	27.5 (81.5)	27.1 (80.8)	31.7 (89.1)
Mean daily maximum °C (°F)	23.2 (73.8)	23.7 (74.7)	23.9 (75.0)	23.7 (74.7)	23.9 (75.0)	23.7 (74.7)	24.0 (75.2)	24.3 (75.7)	24.2 (75.6)	24.6 (76.3)	23.0 (73.4)	22.9 (73.2)	23.7 (74.7)
Daily mean °C (°F)	18.1 (64.6)	18.6 (65.5)	19.1 (66.4)	19.3 (66.7)	19.6 (67.3)	19.4 (66.9)	19.3 (66.7)	19.4 (66.9)	19.4 (66.9)	19.1 (66.4)	18.7 (65.7)	18.1 (64.6)	19.0 (66.2)
Mean daily minimum °C (°F)	13.0 (55.4)	13.5 (56.3)	14.3 (57.7)	15.0 (59.0)	15.2 (59.4)	15.0 (59.0)	14.5 (58.1)	14.6 (58.3)	14.7 (58.5)	14.7 (58.5)	14.4 (57.9)	13.4 (56.1)	14.4 (57.9)
Record low °C (°F)	6.3 (43.3)	4.2 (39.6)	3.0 (37.4)	5.8 (42.4)	5.0 (41.0)	5.6 (42.1)	7.4 (45.3)	5.8 (42.4)	6.4 (43.5)	6.2 (43.2)	5.2 (41.4)	7.6 (45.7)	3.0 (37.4)
Average precipitation mm (inches)	39.8 (1.57)	48.0 (1.89)	62.9 (2.48)	177.4 (6.98)	236.1 (9.30)	163.8 (6.45)	119.4 (4.70)	151.7 (5.97)	228.8 (9.01)	283.5 (11.16)	194.5 (7.66)	78.8 (3.10)	1,784.7 (70.26)
Average rainy days (≥ 1.0 mm)	5.9	5.9	7.5	16.0	19.1	16.3	15.0	18.1	18.8	21.4	17.0	9.7	170.7
Average relative humidity (%)	71.5	71.0	72.0	75.5	76.0	76.0	74.0	73.5	73.5	76.0	76.5	73.5	74.1
Mean monthly sunshine hours	257.3	224.0	226.3	177.0	192.2	180.0	213.9	213.9	201.0	192.2	198.0	235.6	2,511.4
Source 1: Instituto Nacional de Meteorología e Hidrología (INAMEH)
Source 2: Datos climáticos Estación Santa Rosa período 1974–2001, World Meteorological Organization (precipitation, 1961–1990), NOAA(extremes and sun 1961–1990),

== Geology ==
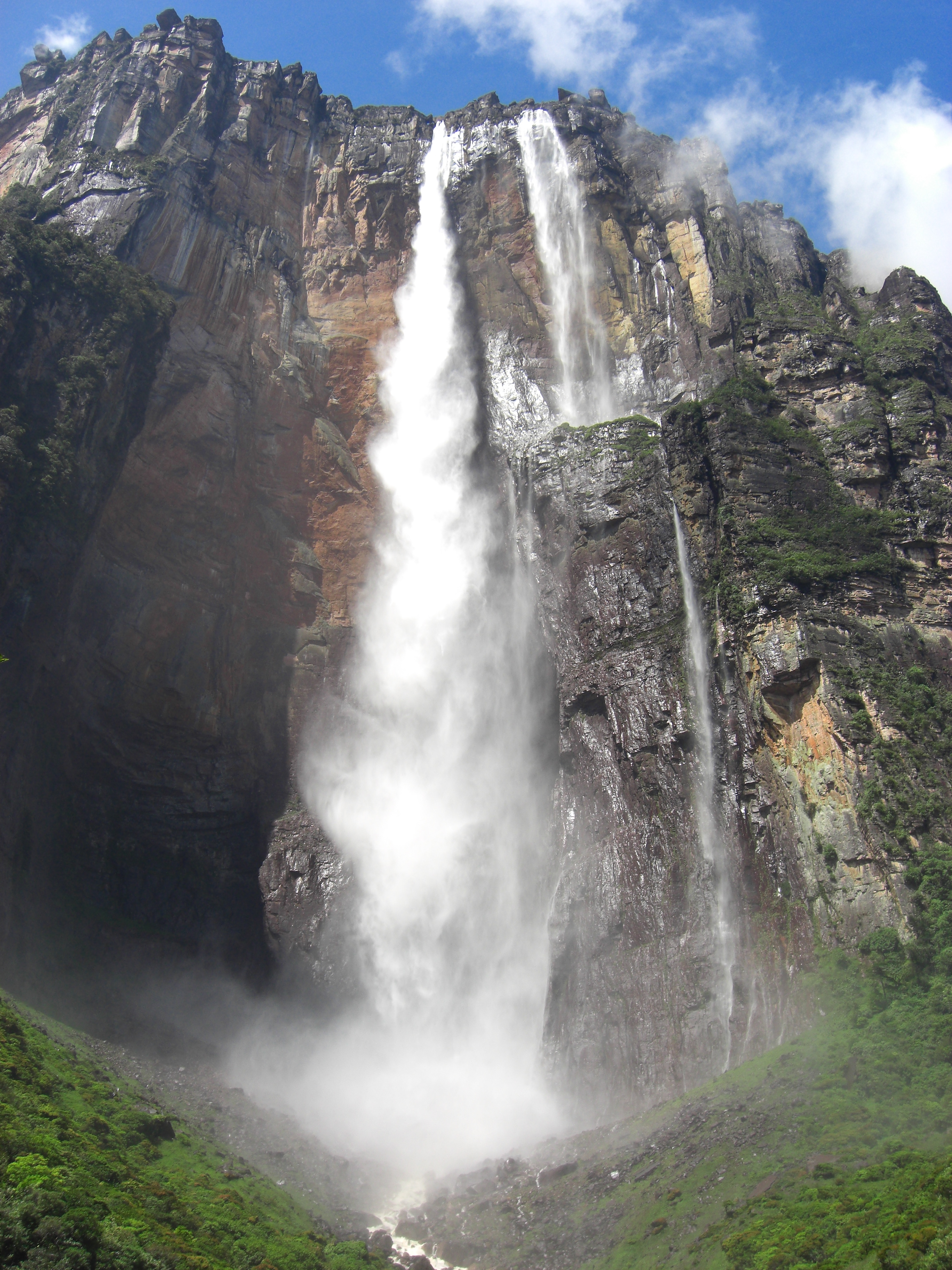
The photo above shows Angel Falls. It depicts the different geological layers that can be found throughout the Andes in Venezuela.

The Andes are located in the northwestern region of Venezuela. The Andes are considered the longest mountain range on Earth spanning from 7,000 kilometers in length and 300 kilometers in width. The mountains are mainly composed of Paleozoic or older metamorphic rocks. Fossils from the Carboniferous period are commonly found throughout the mountain range.

A recent example is the discovery of a potential new dinosaur found in the Táchira State, unearthed near the outskirts of the Andes mountains. The dinosaur was named Tachiraptor admirabilis and is a small specimen measuring in at roughly 1.5 meters from the tip of its tail to the end of its nose. The team who discovered the dinosaur believe the specimen dates to the 201 million years ago, right at the end of the Triassic and start of the Jurassic period.

Rocks and sediments ranging up to the Cretaceous period can be discovered at 3,000 meters or higher. In the more southwestern points of the Andes rocks form the Eocene period can be found in large masses. There are frequent clay deposits known as kaolinite, which are found all throughout Venezuela. These deposits are typically surrounded by latosol, a reddish iron rich dirt. The heavy rain that can be found throughout Venezuela has a large impact on the geology. Erosion is a common trend in Venezuela especially due to the extreme wet seasons. The geology of this mountain range especially in Venezuela has barely been studied even by oil companies.

Historically Venezuela has struggled from colonization and this has led to a focus on recovery. This has led to a focus more on economic advancements and less of a focus on earth sciences. As of 2010 Venezuela has been in the midst of a political, economic, social and humanitarian crises.

== Hydrography ==
The Orinoco is by far the most important of the more than 1,000 rivers in the country. Flowing more than 2,500 kilometers to the Atlantic from its source in the Guiana highlands at the Brazilian border, the Orinoco is the world's eighth largest river and the largest in South America after the Amazon. Its flow varies substantially by season, with the high water level in August exceeding by as much as thirteen meters the low levels of March and April. During low water periods, the river experiences high and low tides for more than 100 kilometers upstream from Ciudad Guayana.

For most of the river's course, the gradient is slight. Downstream from its headwaters, it splits into two; one-third of its flow passes through the Brazo Casiquiare (Casiquiare Channel) into a tributary of the Amazon, and the remainder passes into the main Orinoco channel. This passageway allows vessels with shallow drafts to navigate from the lower Orinoco to the Amazon River system after unloading and reloading on either side of two falls on the Orinoco along the Colombian border.

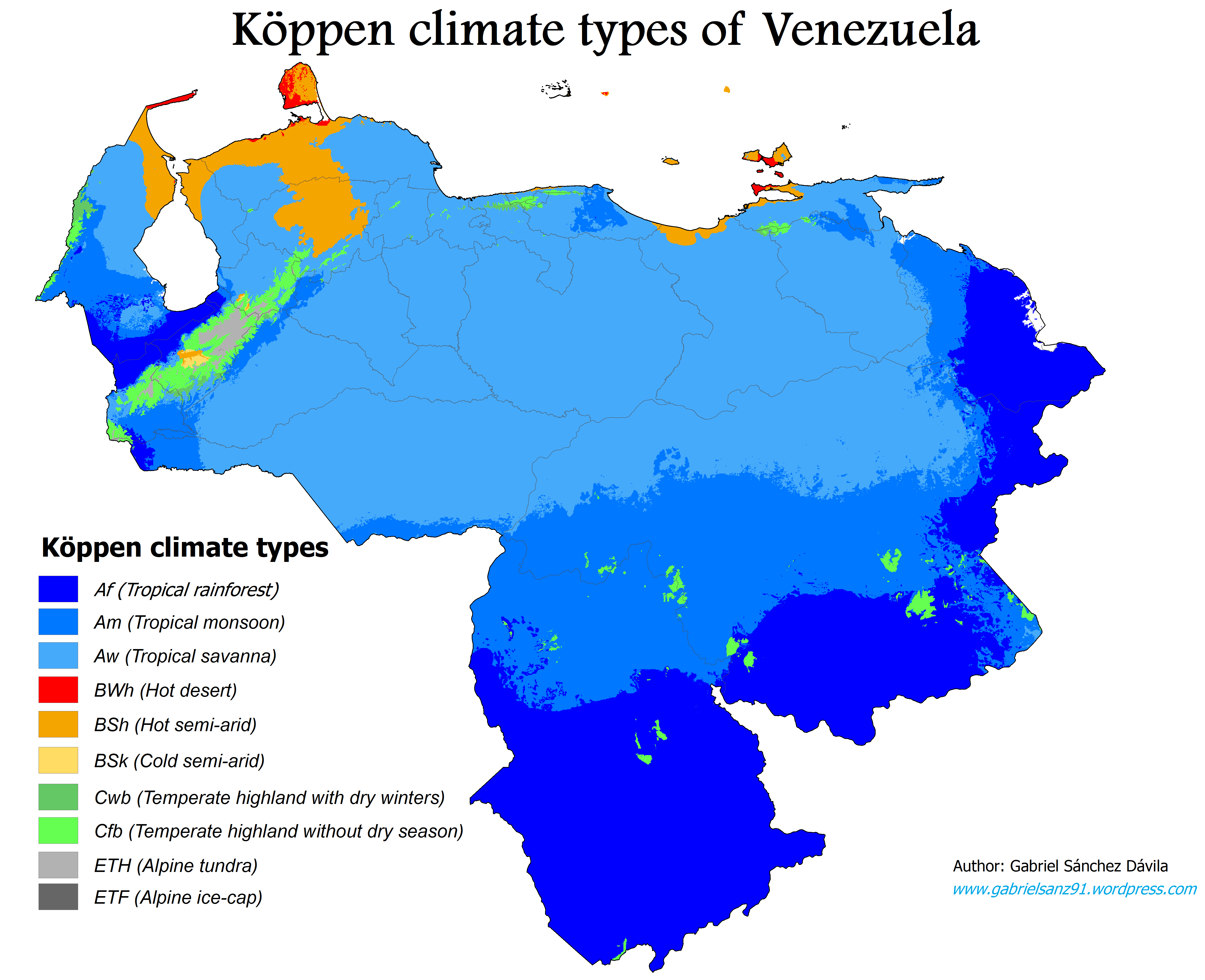
Köppen climate types in Venezuela.

Most of the rivers rising in the northern mountains flow southeastward to the Río Apure, a tributary of the Orinoco. From its headwater, the Apure crosses the llanos in a generally eastward direction. Few rivers flow into it from the poorly drained region south of the river and much of this area near the Colombian border is swampland.

The other major Venezuelan river is the fast-flowing Caroní, which originates in the Guiana highlands and flows northward into the Orinoco upstream from Ciudad Guyana. The Caroní is capable of producing as much hydroelectric power as any river in Latin America and has contributed significantly to the nation's electric power production. Electricity generated by the Caroní was one of the factors encouraging industrialization of the northern part of the Guiana highlands and the lower Orinoco valley.

Lake Maracaibo occupies the central 13,500 square kilometers of the Maracaibo lowlands. The low swampy shores of the lake and areas beneath the lake itself hold most of Venezuela's rich petroleum deposits. The lake is shallow, with an average depth of ten meters, and separated from the Caribbean by a series of islands and sandbars. In 1955 a 7.5-meter channel was cut through the sandbars to facilitate shipping between the lake and the Caribbean. The channel also allows salt water to mix with the yellowish fresh water of the lake, making the northern parts brackish and unsuited for drinking or irrigation.

A recent global remote sensing analysis suggested that there were 732 km^{2} (283 sq mi) of tidal flats in Venezuela, making it the 36th ranked country in terms of tidal flat extent.

== Soil ==
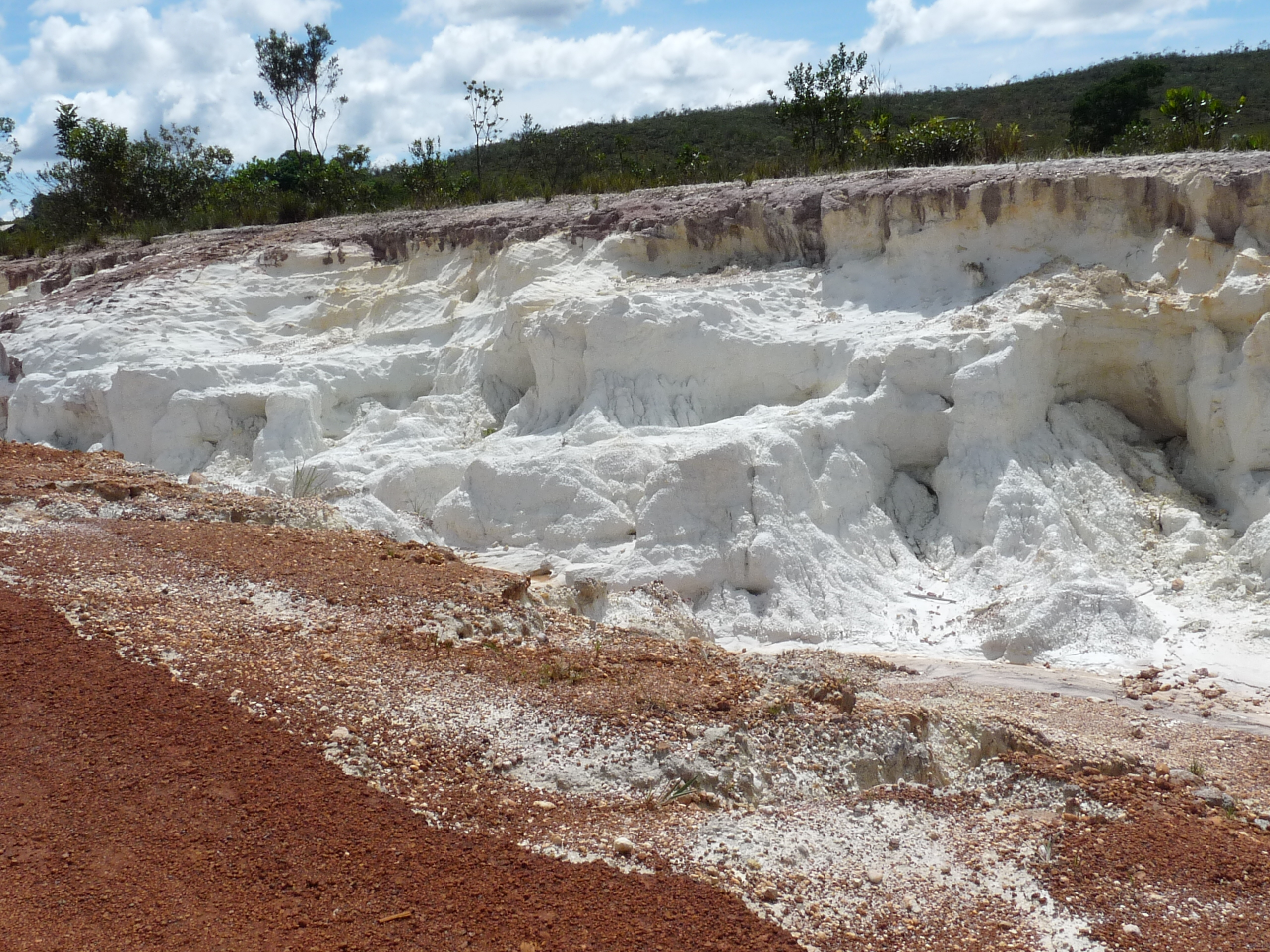
A deposit of white clay which is also known as kaolinite surrounded by latosol. This photo was taken in Cantarrana, Bolivar state, Venezuela.

Venezuelan soil is oftentimes unusable or considered infertile for typical farming and growing use. Reddish latosol is the typical type of soil that can be found throughout the entirety of Venezuela. This type of soil is rich in iron and aluminum oxide and extremely difficult in most other minerals. The abundance of iron and aluminum oxide is almost entirely due in part to the fact that these minerals are insoluble. Venezuelan soil is oversaturated and moist which makes it lacking in other soluble minerals. Rivers, like the Rio Orinoco and the Caroní, are susceptible to flooding due in part to the heavy precipitation and intense wet seasons.

Most fertile soil in Venezuela is created through the drainage of water from soils and designated agricultural farms. Historically, places within Venezuela with especially poor soil have been avoided as settlement areas. Only roughly 5% of the Venezuelan population is located south of the Orinoco river. Due to this issue of oversaturated soils Venezuela has invested in drainage technology, namely in two large watersheds. These watersheds dump into the Caribbean and the Atlantic respectively.

== Historical Geography ==
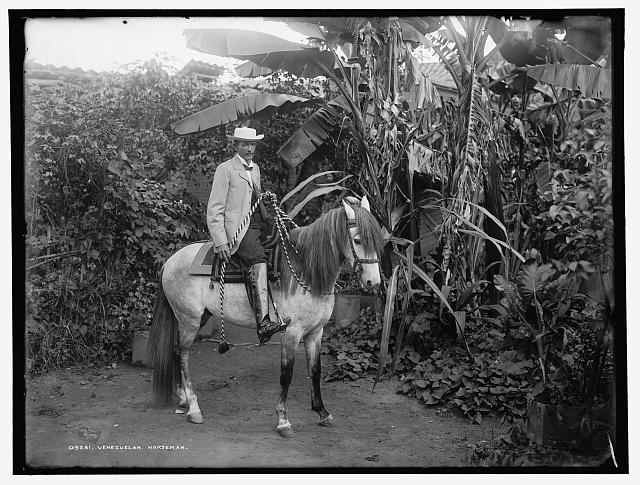
Venezuelan Horseman, a photograph taken anywhere in between the years 1901-1906. The photograph was published through Detroit Publishing Company.

"Frank Radcliffe; a Story of Travel and Adventure in the Forests of Venezuela" was written by a Christian man named Achilles Daunt. The Travelogue was published in 1884 and comprised a total of 432 pages depicting a foreigner's journey through the Venezuelan landscape. This is a great primary resource that lets historians observe, through intense descriptions, Venezuela prior to industrialization. Examples of exports of Venezuela from this time are mentioned as sugar cane and coffee. Both exports throughout history have phased out of production. Since the early 1900s Venezuela has relied on oil as its main export.

In 2013, raw materials made up 85.47% of Venezuela's exports. This reliance on raw materials being the main exports was also described in the writing. The description of geography heavily ranges as Daunt travels through Venezuela. The landscape can range from mountainous, to heavy tropics, and even dry, flat lands. The natural water from the many different rivers within Venezuela led to lush forests that supported and facilitated wildlife. Daunt talks about flat mountainous structures that lead to a harsh drop. This was in reference to the many plateaus in Venezuela like the ones that can be found Canaima National Park.

The Canaima National Park spans more than 30,000 square kilometers. This makes it one of the largest parks in Venezuela and a popular tourist site. The river of Guaire is a hub of tropical life in Venezuela. The riverbanks were covered in large hedges of wild plants that sometimes rose to 30 feet. This travelogue provides empirical observations of land, geography, and wildlife during the late 1800s. It also shows interactions with natives of this land and the everlasting road to recovery from colonialism.

Photographs are examples of empirical primary sources. They can be observed and help tell historians information that may not be discernible through writing or other forms of media. Looking at the Venezuelan Horseman, we see a man dressed fairly well riding on a horse. In the background we see tropical plants that hold resemblance to a Musa plant. Other plants sporadically grow and combine with other plants to form large hedges of intertwined green. Within the photograph one can see the same information and descriptives that Daunt discusses when traveling through Venezuela.

== Extreme points ==
- Northernmost point – Isla Aves
- Northernmost point (mainland) – Cape San Román
- Southernmost point – Border with Brazil, Río Negro Municipality, Amazonas
- Westernmost point – Border with Colombia, Zulia State
- Easternmost point – Border with Guyana, near Caribbean sea coast, Delta Amacuro State
- Highest point – Pico Bolívar: 4,978 m (16,332 ft)
- Lowest point – Caribbean Sea: 0 m
