= Cape San Román =

Cape in Falcón State, Venezuela

Coordinates: 12°11′46″N 70°00′59″W

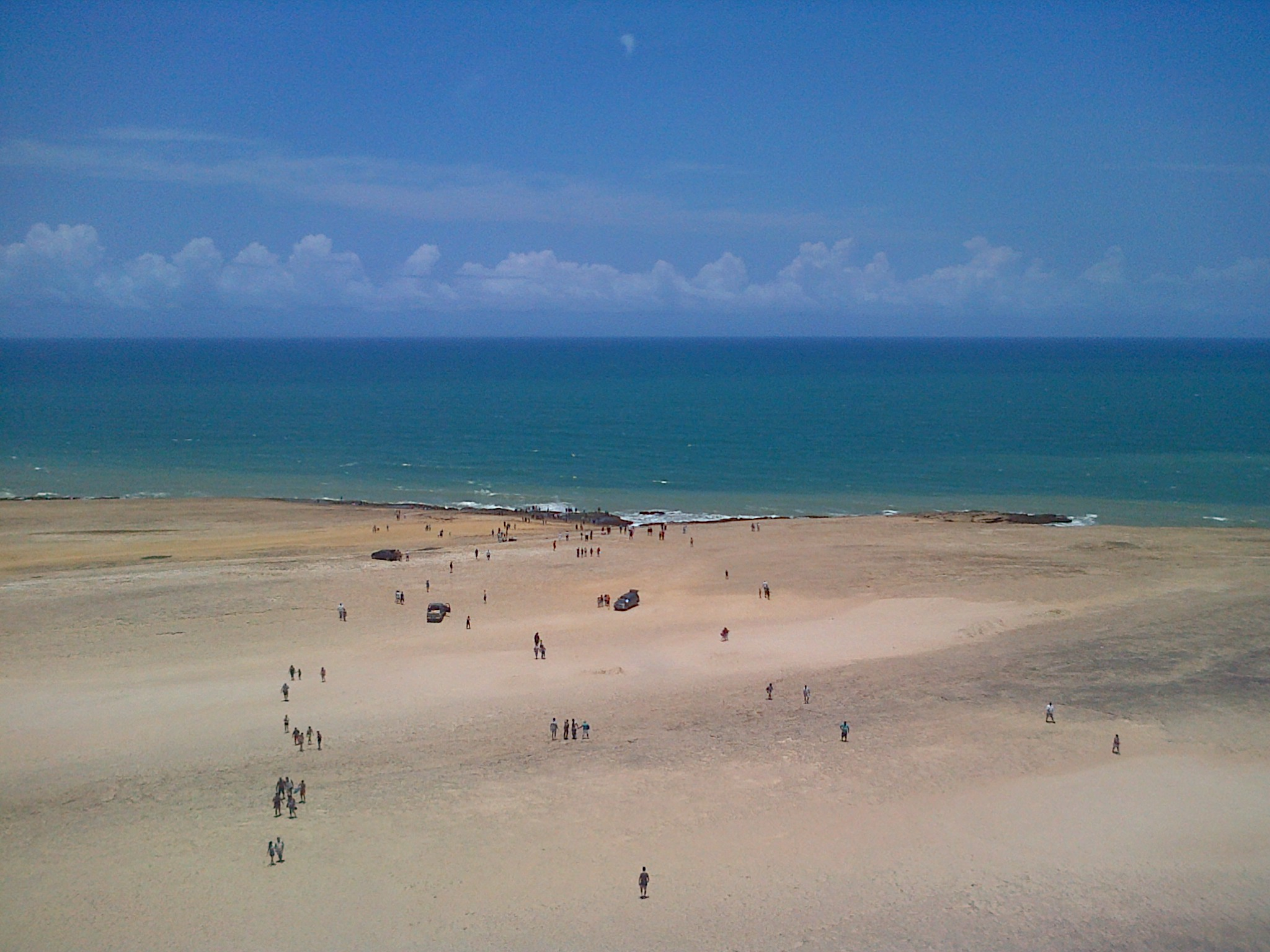
Cape San Román view from the lighthouse.

Cape San Román (Spanish: Cabo San Román) is a cape located in Paraguaná's northernmost point in Falcón State, Venezuela.
