= List of ultras of South America =

This is a list of the 209 ultra prominent peaks, or ultras in South America. An ultra is a mountain summit with a topographic prominence of 1,500 metres (4,921 ft) or more.

== Guiana Highlands ==
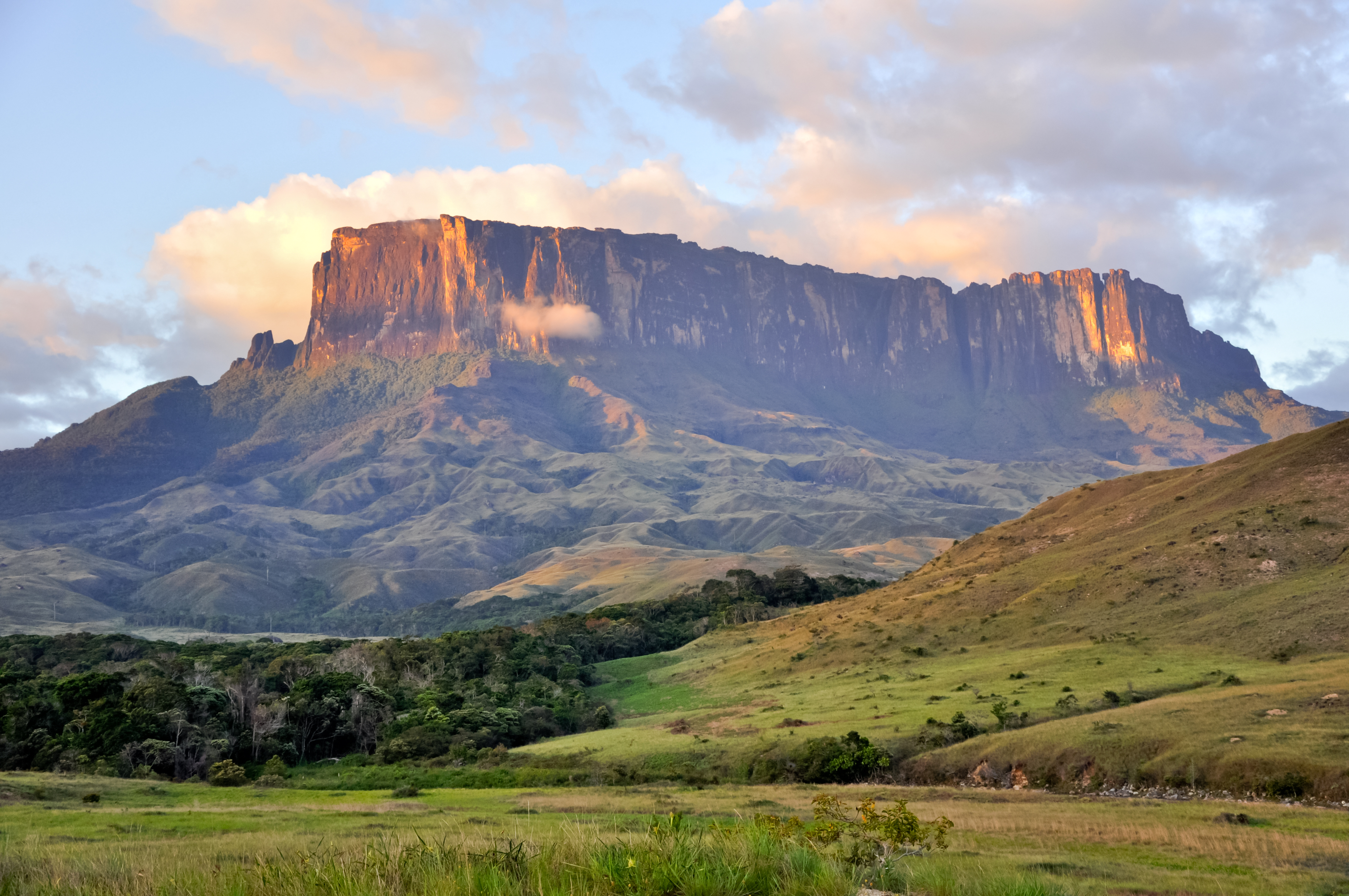
Monte Roraima, on the triple Venezuela / Guyana / Brazil border (its summit is within Venezuela)

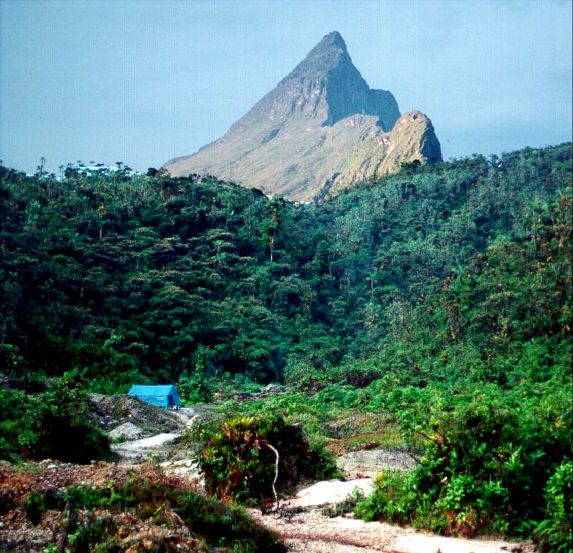
Pico da Neblina, Brazil

No	Peak	Country	Elevation (m)	Prominence (m)	Col (m)
1	Pico da Neblina	Brazil	2,994	2,886	108
2	Monte Roraima	Venezuela / Guyana / Brazil	2,810	2,338	472
3	Marahuaca	Venezuela	2,832	2,289	543
4	Serrania Guanay	Venezuela	2,392	2,026	366
5	Serra Imeri	Brazil	2,500	1,951	549
6	Serra Tulu Tuloi	Brazil	2,140	1,950	190
7	Serra da Mocidade	Brazil	1,980	1,830	150
8	Sierra de Maigualida	Venezuela	2,350	1,790	560
9	Serra do Pacu	Brazil	1,880	1,712	168
10	Cerro Cerbatana	Venezuela	2,080	1,708	372
11	Cerro Raya	Venezuela	2,070	1,686	384
12	Chimata Tepuy	Venezuela	2,675	1,658	1017
13	Tulu Tuloi II	Brazil	1,780	1,584	196
14	Meseta del Cerro Jaua	Venezuela	2,395	1,572	823

== Sierra Nevada de Santa Marta, Cordillera Oriental, Cordillera de Mérida, and Coastal Range ==
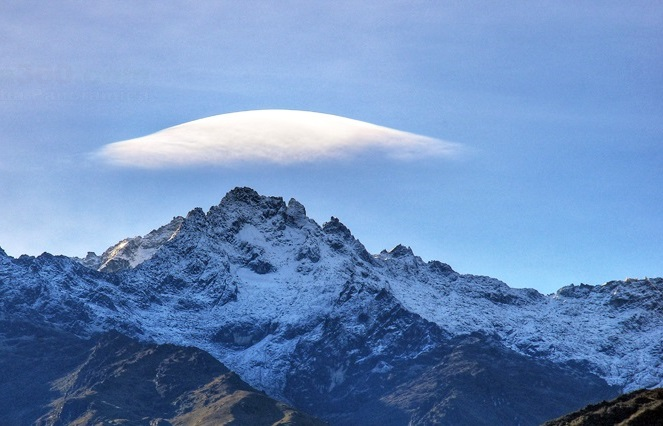
Pico Bolivar, Venezuela

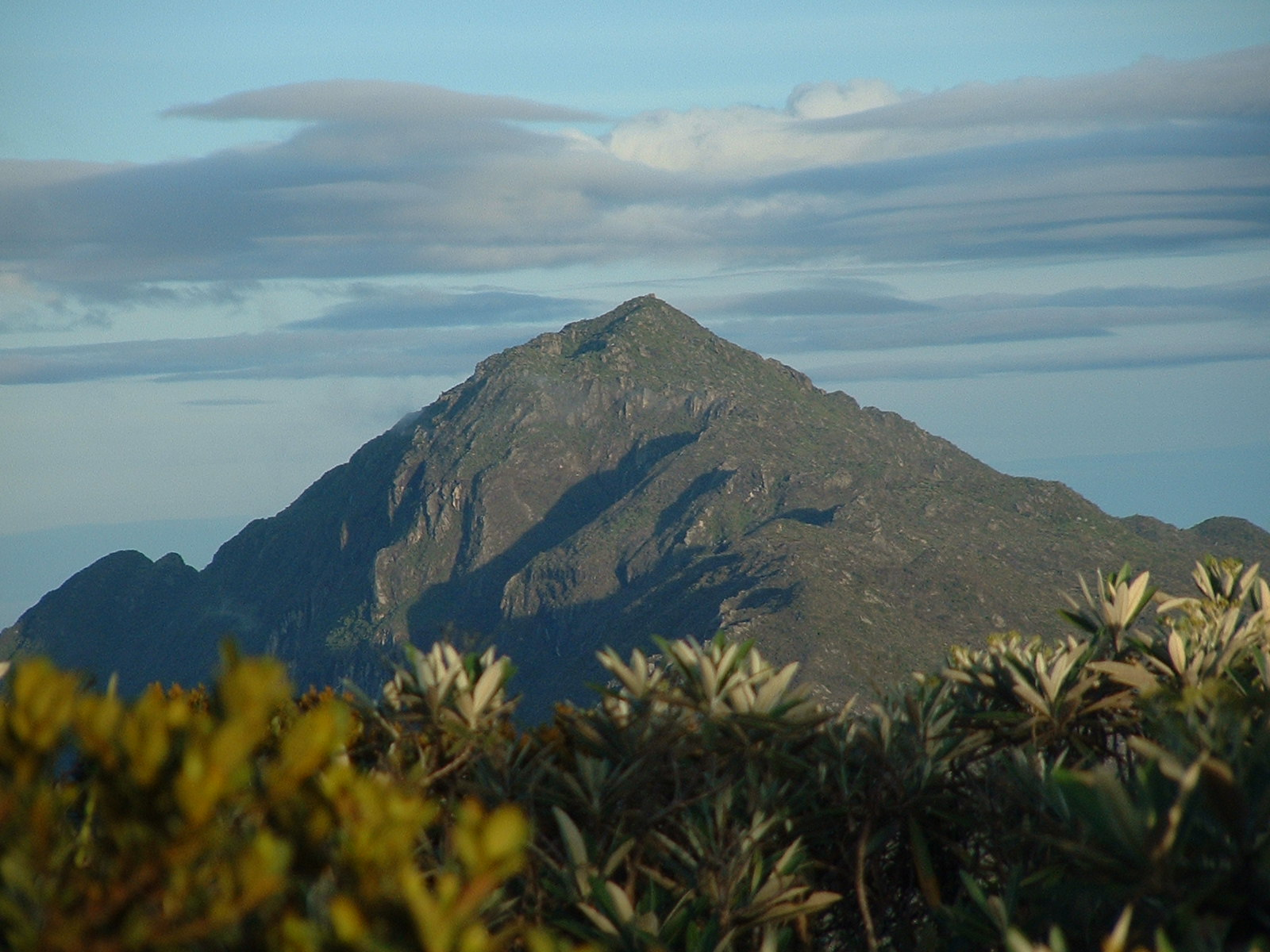
Pico Naiguata, Venezuela

No	Peak	Country	Elevation (m)	Prominence (m)	Col (m)
1	Pico Cristóbal Colón	Colombia	5,775	5,584	191
2	Pico Bolívar	Venezuela	4,981	3,957	1024
3	Ritacuba Blanco	Colombia	5,410	3,645	1765
4	Tristeza	Venezuela	2,596	2,456	140
5	Pico Naiguata	Venezuela	2,765	2,455	310
6	Pintado	Colombia / Venezuela	3,660	2,181	140
7	Saliente del Rio Guape	Colombia	4,180	1,835	2345
8	Cordillera los Pichacos	Colombia	3,630	1,704	1926
9	Cordillera de los Cobardes	Colombia	3,420	1,658	1762
10	Pico el Turmal	Venezuela	3,560	1,542	2018
11	Paramo el Nevado	Colombia	4,250	1,532	2718
12	Cuchilla San Lorenzo	Colombia	2,866	1,522	1344
13	Cerro el Cerron	Venezuela	2,100	1,500	600

== Cordillera Occidental and Cordillera Central ==
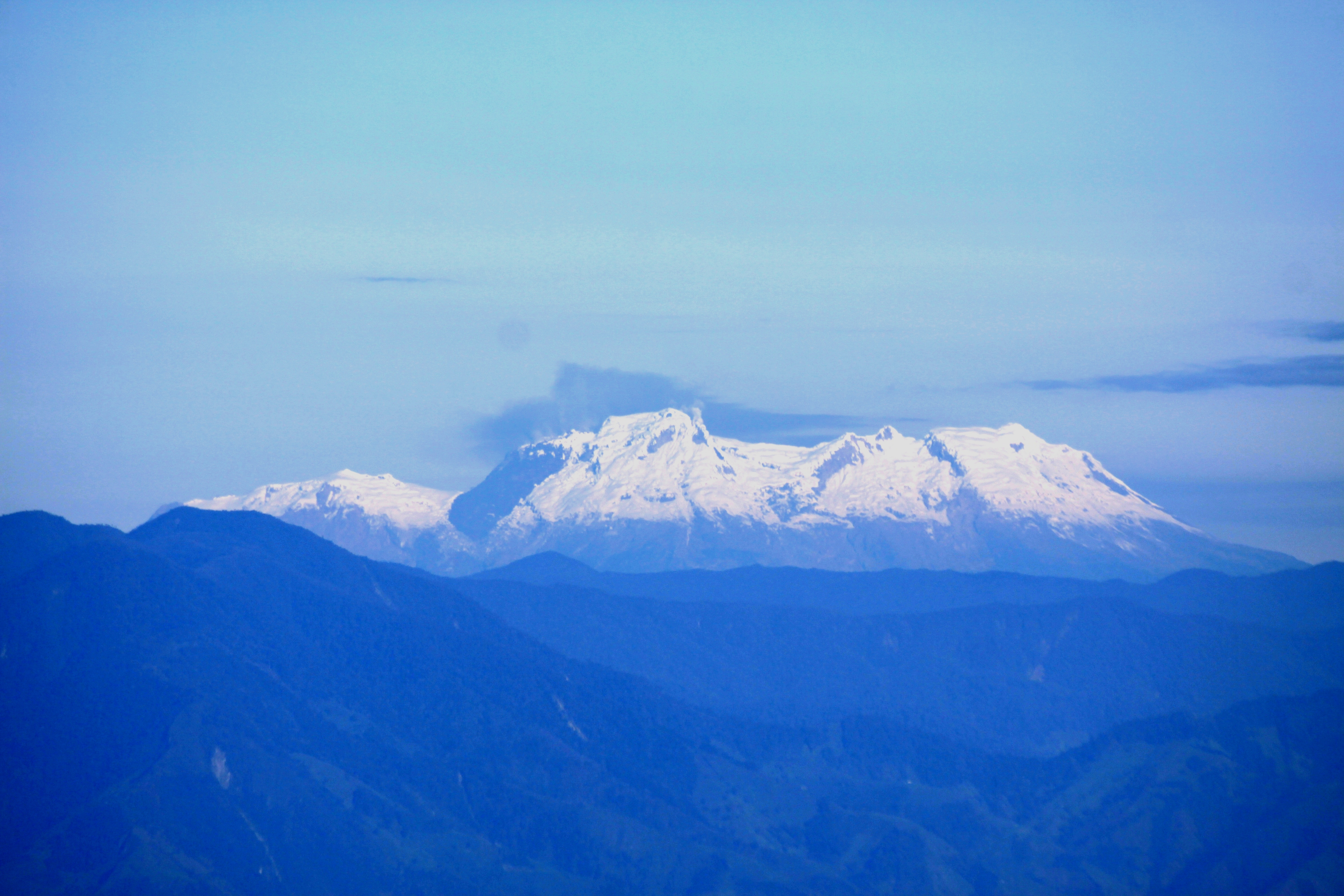
Nevado del Huila, Colombia

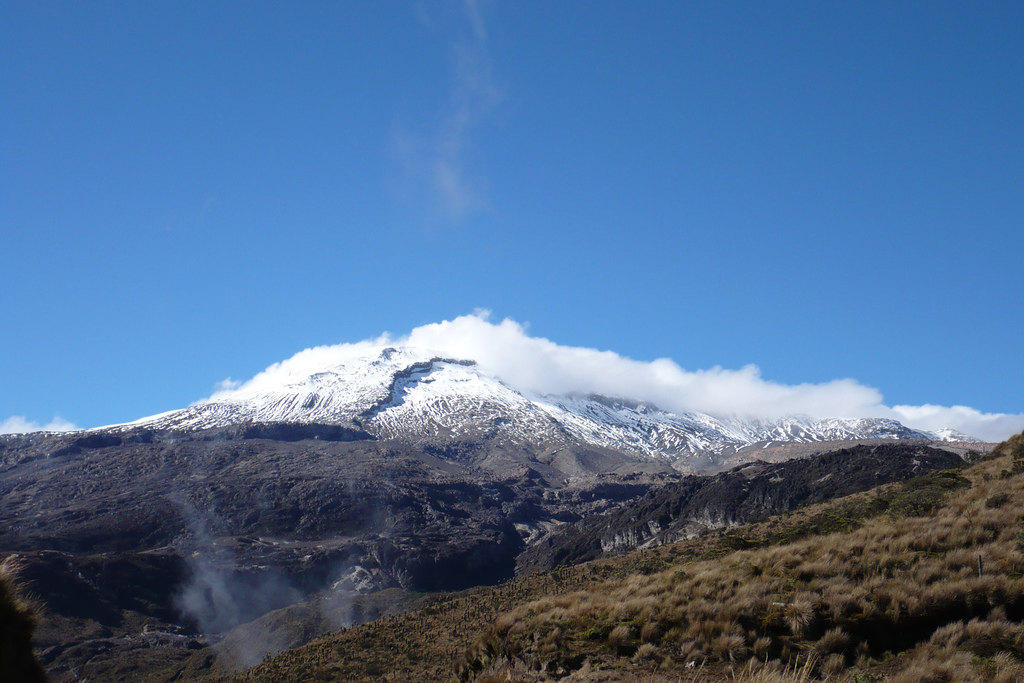
Nevado del Ruiz, Colombia

No	Peak	Country	Elevation (m)	Prominence (m)	Col (m)
1	Nevado del Huila	Colombia	5,390	2,650	2740
2	Tamana	Colombia	4,100	2,573	1527
3	Farallones de Cali	Colombia	4,050	2,309	1741
4	Farallones de Citara	Colombia	4,050	2,280	1770
5	Calima	Colombia	3,840	2,242	1598
6	Nevado del Ruiz	Colombia	5,300	2,035	3265
7	Paramo Frontino	Colombia	3,950	1,953	1997
8	Napi	Colombia	3,860	1,837	2023
9	Tacarcuna	Colombia	1,870	1,765	105
10	San Lucas	Colombia	2,270	1,702	568
11	Torra	Colombia	2,820	1,659	1161
12	Cumbal	Colombia	4,760	1,575	3185
13	Paramillo	Colombia	3,730	1,559	2171
14	Alto de Nique	Colombia / Panama	1,730	1,557	174

== Cordilleras of Ecuador ==
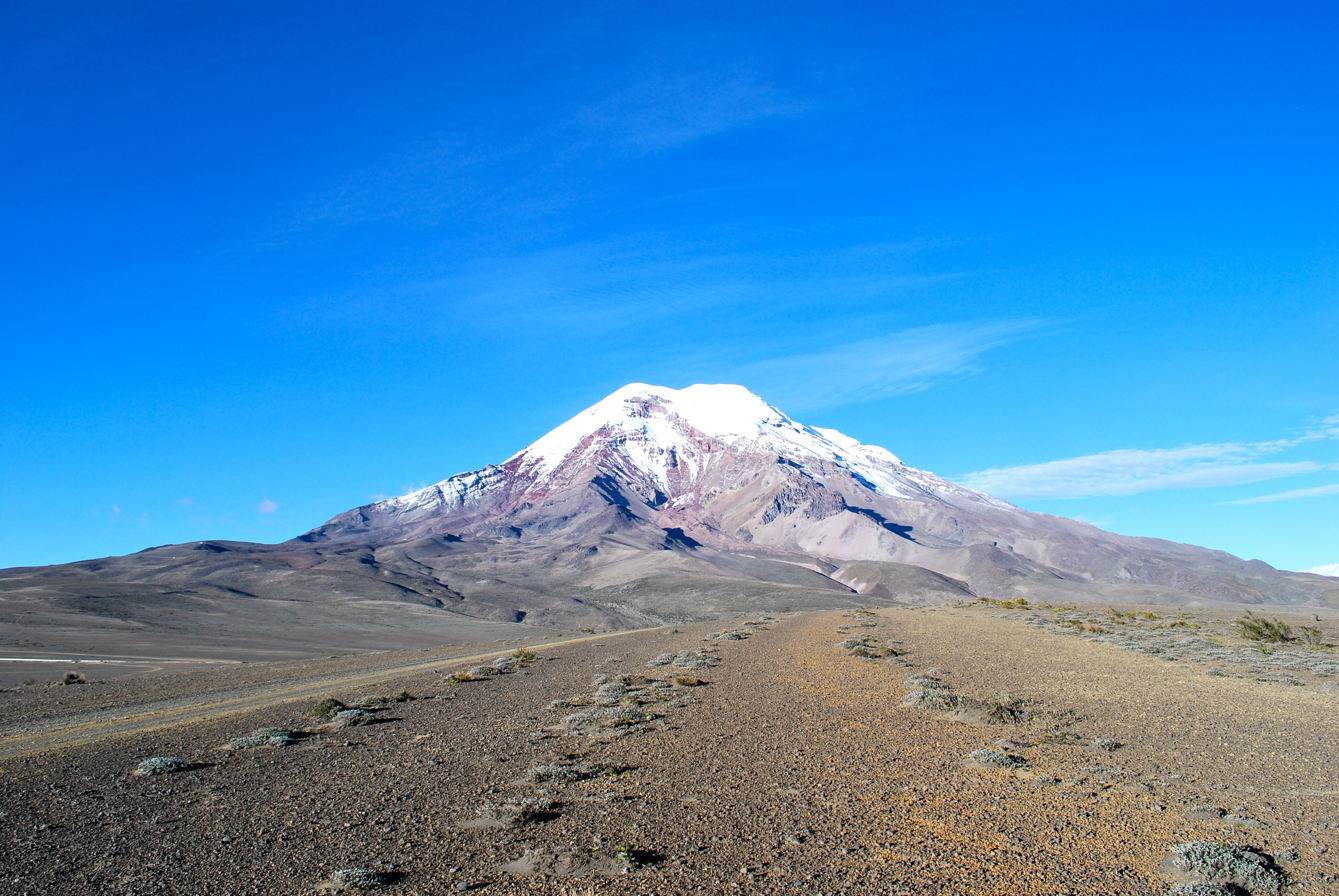
Chimborazo, Ecuador

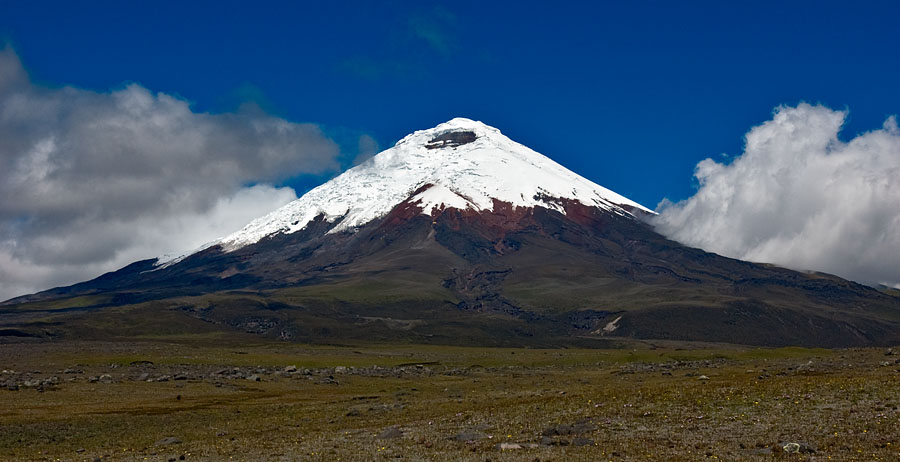
Cotopaxi, Ecuador

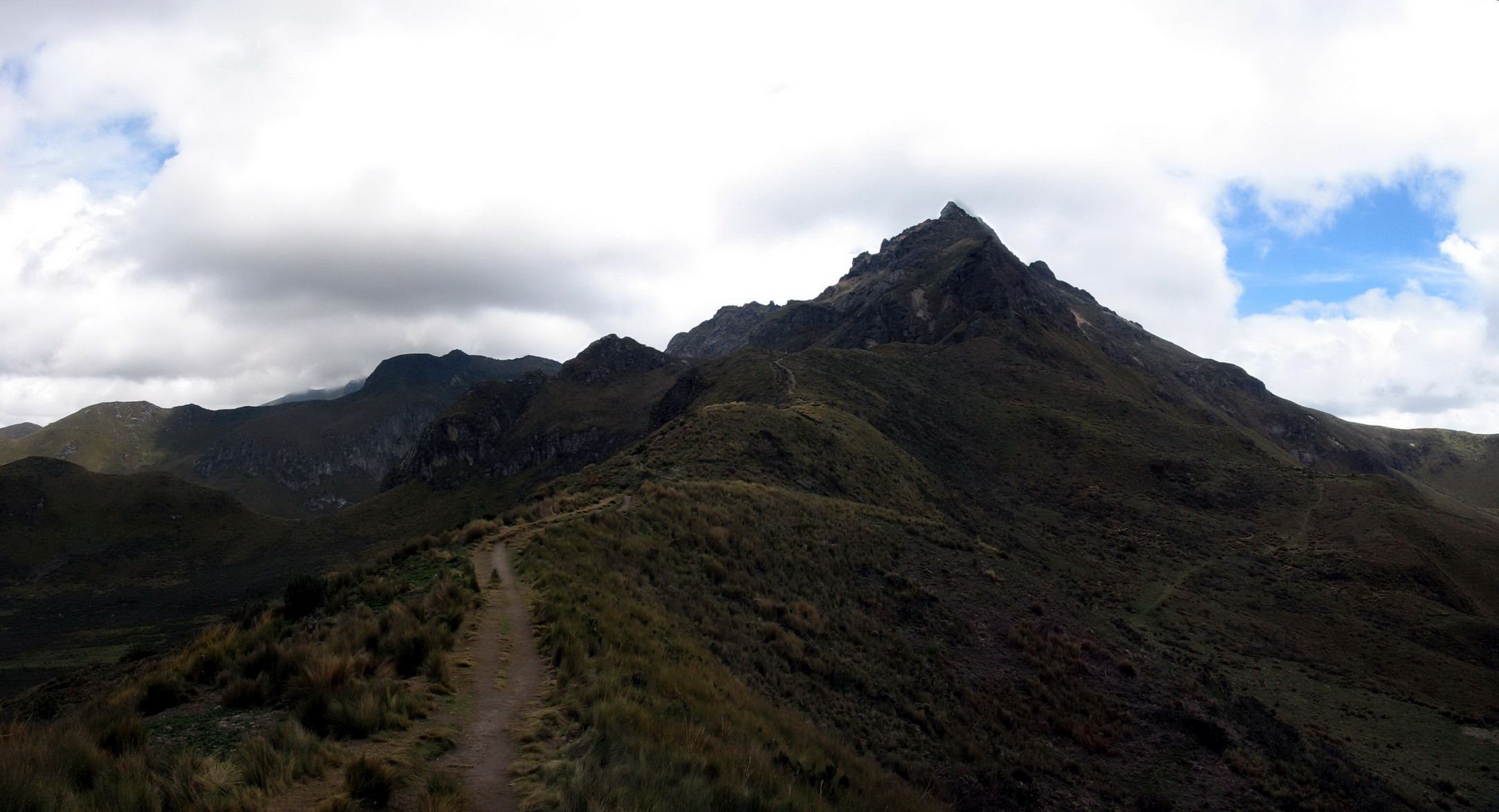
Pichincha, Ecuador

No	Peak	Country	Elevation (m)	Prominence (m)	Col (m)
1	Chimborazo	Ecuador	6,267	4,122	2145
2	Cotopaxi	Ecuador	5,896	2,403	3493
3	Cayambe	Ecuador	5,790	2,075	3715
4	El Altar	Ecuador	5,319	2,072	3247
5	Cordillera del Cóndor	Ecuador	2,950	2,011	939
6	Cotacachi	Ecuador	4,944	1,837	3107
7	Illiniza Sur	Ecuador	5,263	1,750	3513
8	Antisana	Ecuador	5,704	1,678	4026
9	Pichincha	Ecuador	4,794	1,652	3142
10	Sangay	Ecuador	5,300	1,588	3712
11	Tungurahua	Ecuador	5,016	1,554	3462
12	Sumaco	Ecuador	3,790	1,536	2254
13	Imbabura	Ecuador	4,634	1,519	3115

== Galápagos ==
No	Peak	Country	Elevation (m)	Prominence (m)	Col (m)
1	Volcán Wolf	Ecuador (Isabela Island)	1,707	1,707	0
2	Cerro Azul	Ecuador (Isabela Island)	1,689	1,668	21

== Cordillera Blanca and northern Peru ==
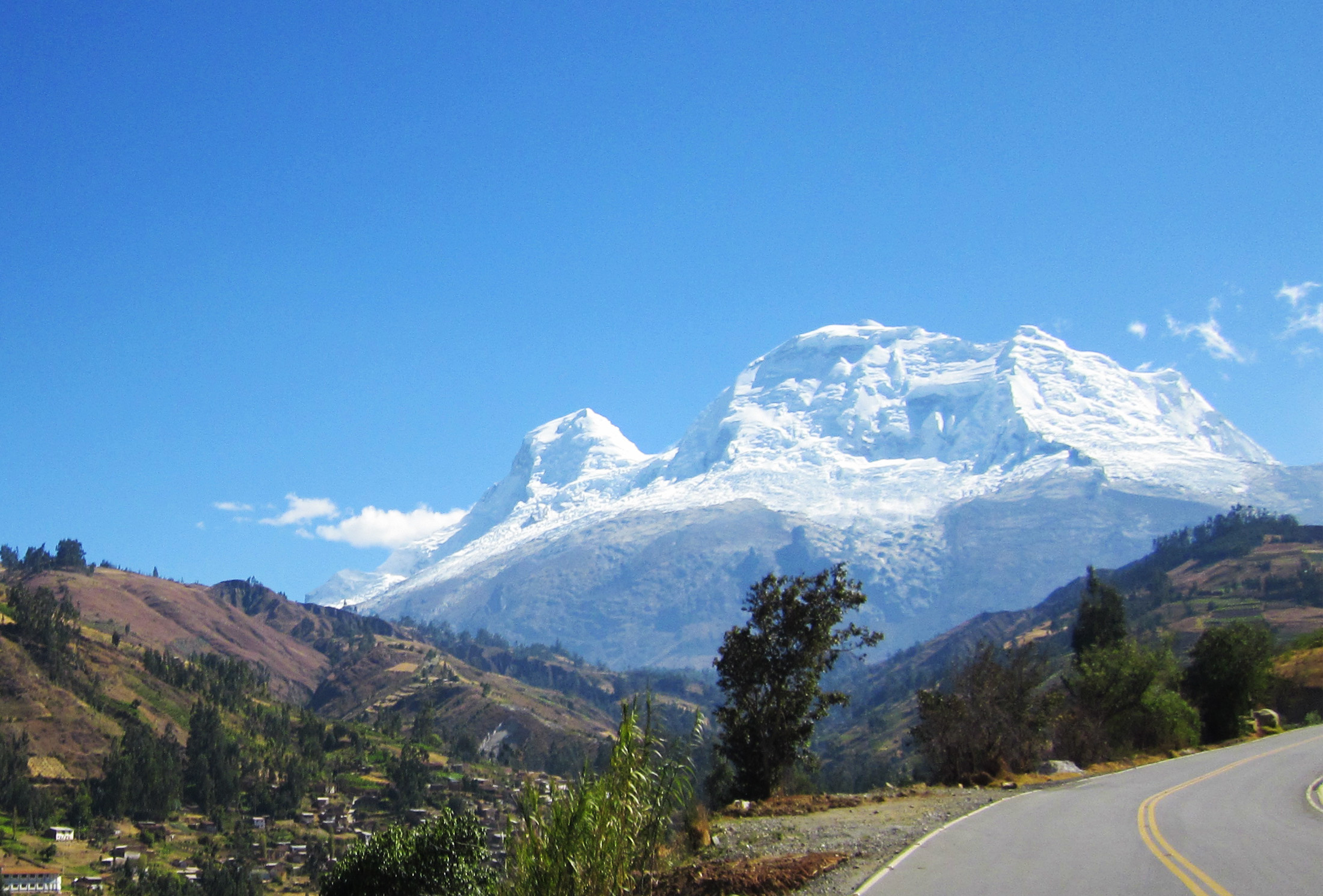
Huascarán, Peru

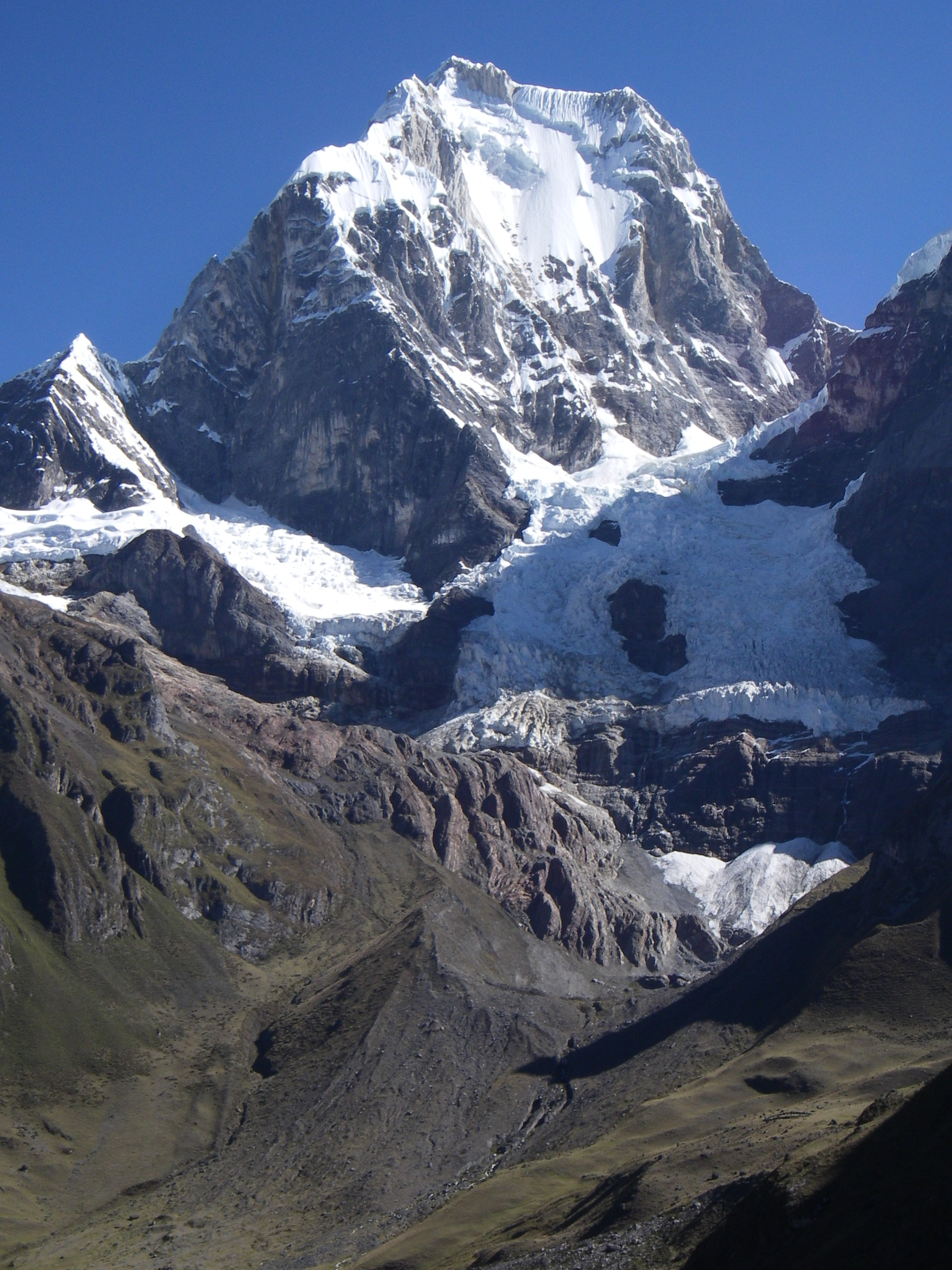
Yerupajá, Peru

No	Peak	Country	Elevation (m)	Prominence (m)	Col (m)
1	Huascarán	Peru	6,768	2,776	3970
2	Yerupajá	Peru	6,634	2,028	4589
3	Mishahuanga	Peru	4,118	1,826	2292
4	Abra la Esperanza	Peru	3,660	1,798	1862
5	Campanario	Peru	4,010	1,778	2232
6	Point 2868	Peru	2,868	1,662	1206
7	Huandoy	Peru	6,395	1,645	4715
8	Huantsán	Peru	6,369	1,633	4736
9	Huaytapallana	Peru	5,557	1,572	3985
10	Bravo	Peru	3,970	1,571	2399
11	Pico Sira	Peru	2,450	1,564	886
12	Champara	Peru	5,735	1,509	4226

== Cordillera Oriental ==
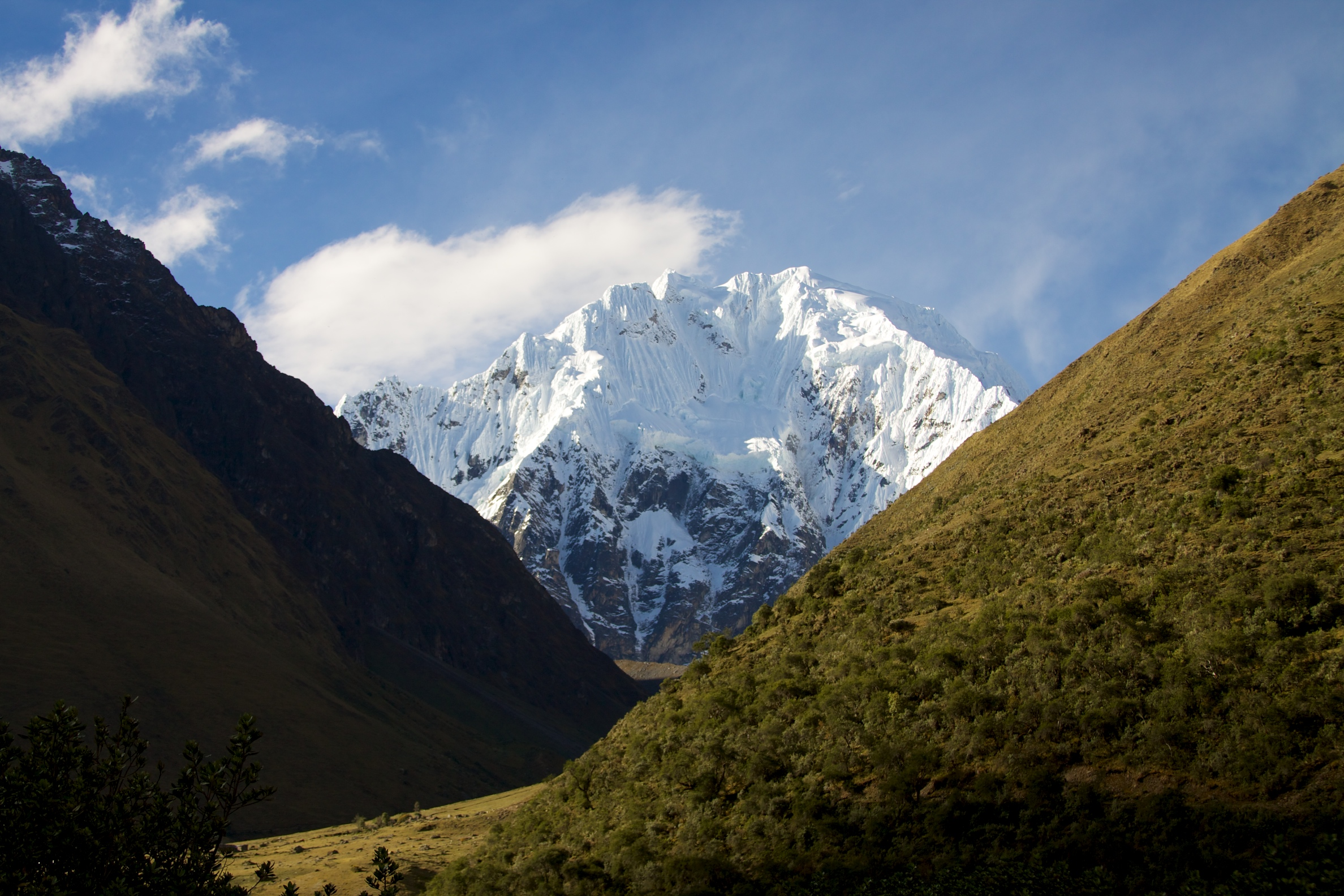
Salcantay, Peru

No	Peak	Country	Elevation (m)	Prominence (m)	Col (m)
1	Salcantay	Peru	6,271	2,540	3724
2	Illimani	Bolivia	6,438	2,451	3987
3	Ausangate	Peru	6,372	2,085	4287
4	HP Cordillera Vilcabamba	Peru	4,150	2,070	2080
5	Ancohuma	Bolivia	6,437	1,957	4470
6	Sahuasiray	Peru	5,818	1,920	3898
7	Gigante	Bolivia	5,748	1,768	3980
8	Cumbre Salto del Fraile	Bolivia	4,480	1,660	2820
9	Chorolque	Bolivia	5,520	1,542	3978
10	Chaupi Orco	Bolivia / Peru	6,044	1,537	4507
11	Phutulu Punta	Bolivia	4,284	1,519	2765

== Cordillera Occidental ==
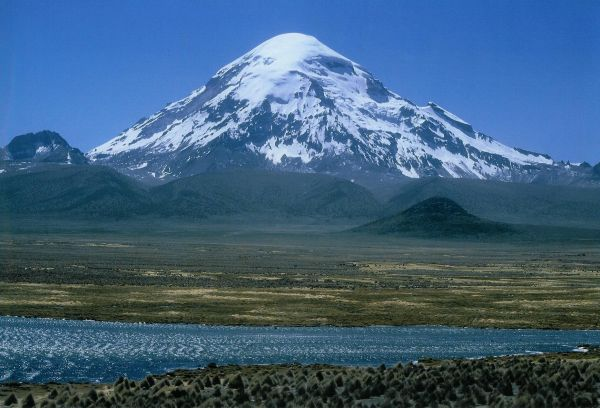
Nevado Sajama, Bolivia

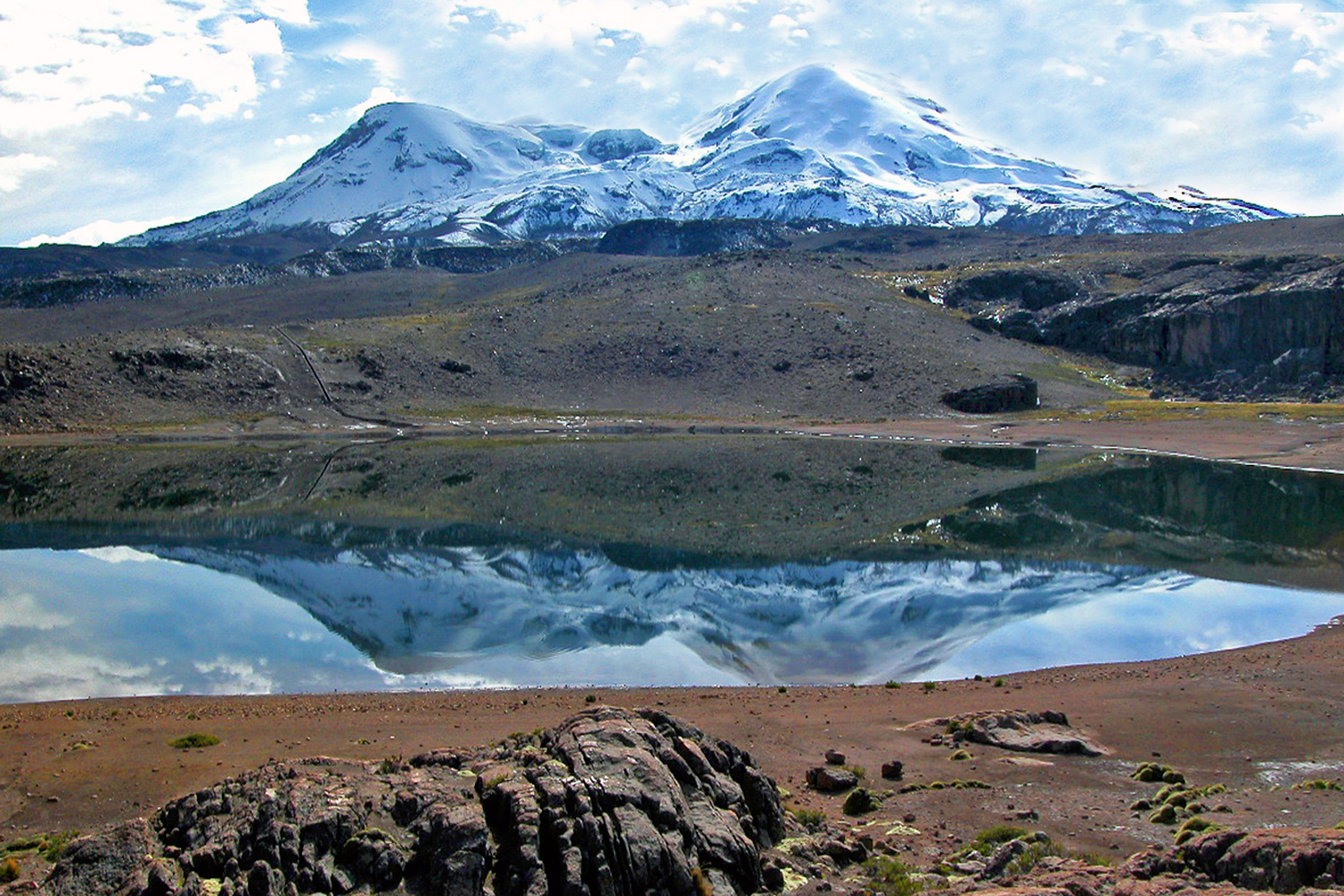
Coropuna, Peru

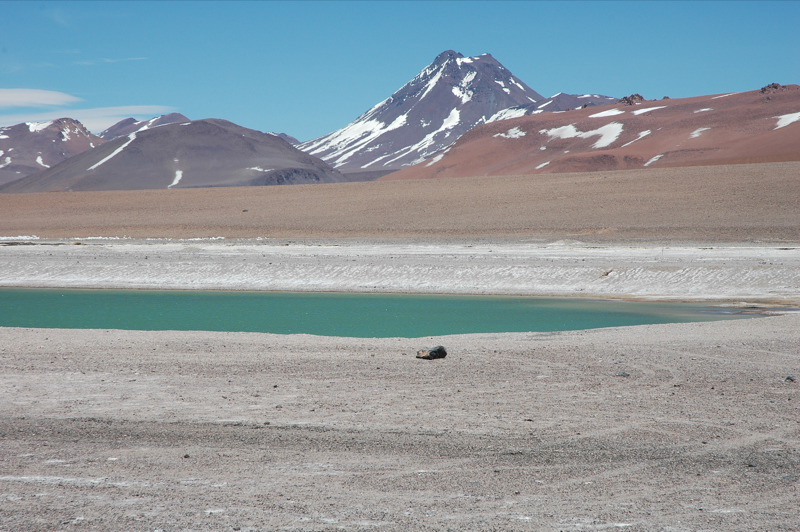
Acamarachi, Chile

No	Peak	Country	Elevation (m)	Prominence (m)	Col (m)
1	Nevado Sajama	Bolivia	6,542	2,428	4094
2	Coropuna	Peru	6,425	2,208	4197
3	Aucanquilcha	Chile	6,176	2,165	4011
4	Sara Sara	Peru	5,505	2,060	3445
5	Volcán San Pedro	Chile	6,145	2,024	4121
6	Ampato	Peru	6,288	1,997	4291
7	Parinacota Volcano	Bolivia / Chile	6,342	1,989	4353
8	Huayna Potosí	Bolivia	6,088	1,352	4436
9	Chachani	Peru	6,057	1,963	4094
10	Palpana	Chile	6,040	1,947	4093
11	Misti	Peru	5,822	1,785	4037
12	Alto Toroni	Bolivia / Chile	5,995	1,733	4262
13	Tacora	Chile	5,988	1,721	4267
14	Ollagüe	Bolivia / Chile	5,868	1,686	4182
15	Cerro Paniri	Chile	5,960	1,653	4307
16	Acamarachi	Chile	6,046	1,608	4438
17	Tunupa	Bolivia	5,321	1,601	3720
18	Callejon Canapa	Bolivia	5,900	1,595	4305
19	Tomasamil	Bolivia	5,830	1,590	4240
20	Cabaray	Bolivia	5,869	1,589	4280

== Brazilian Highlands ==
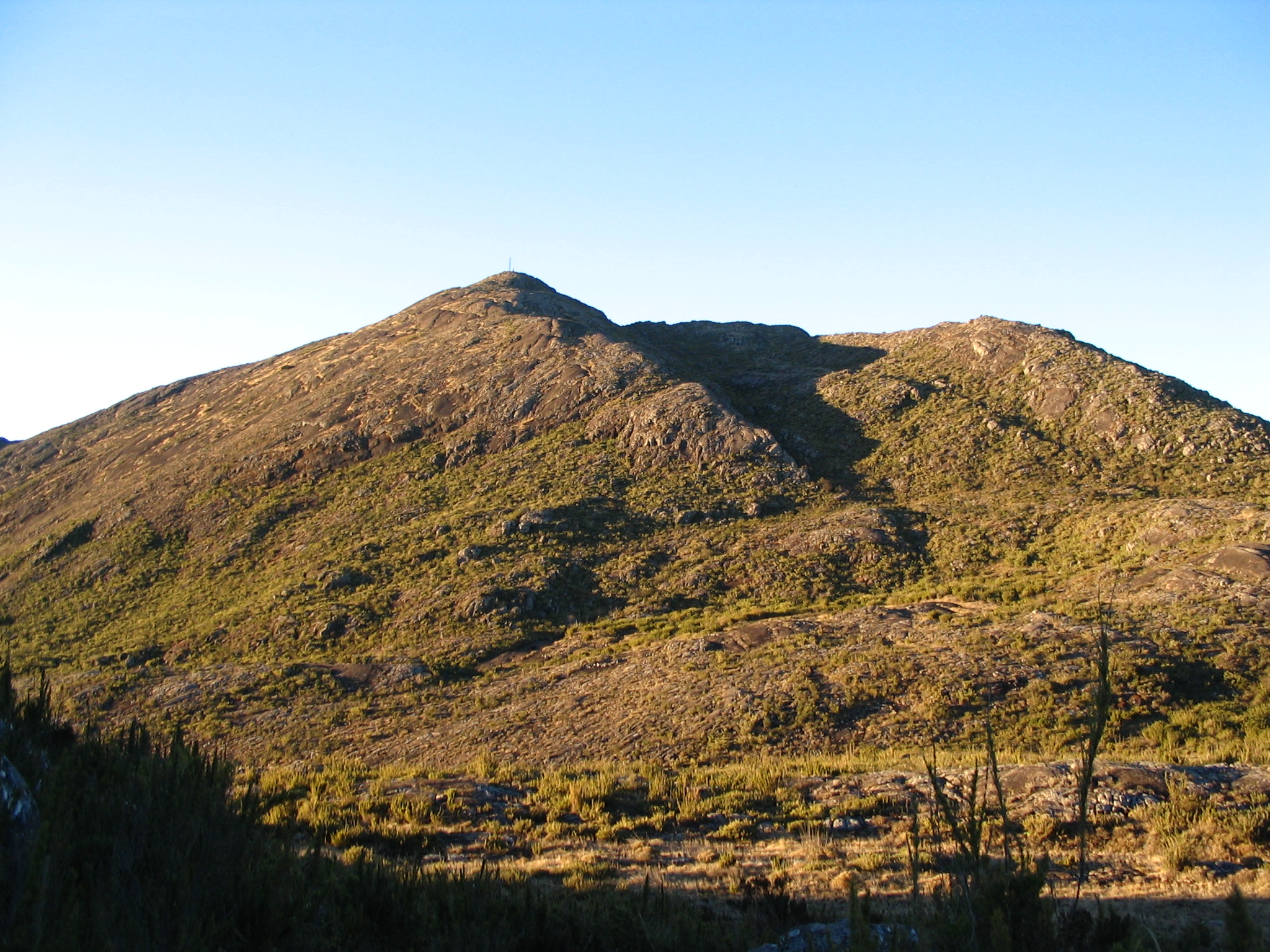
Pico da Bandeira, Brazil

No	Peak	Country	Elevation (m)	Prominence (m)	Col (m)
1	Pico da Bandeira	Brazil	2,890	2,640	250
2	Pedra da Mina	Brazil	2,798	2,068	730
3	Pico Maior de Friburgo	Brazil	2,366	1,947	419

== Puna de Atacama to Aconcagua ==
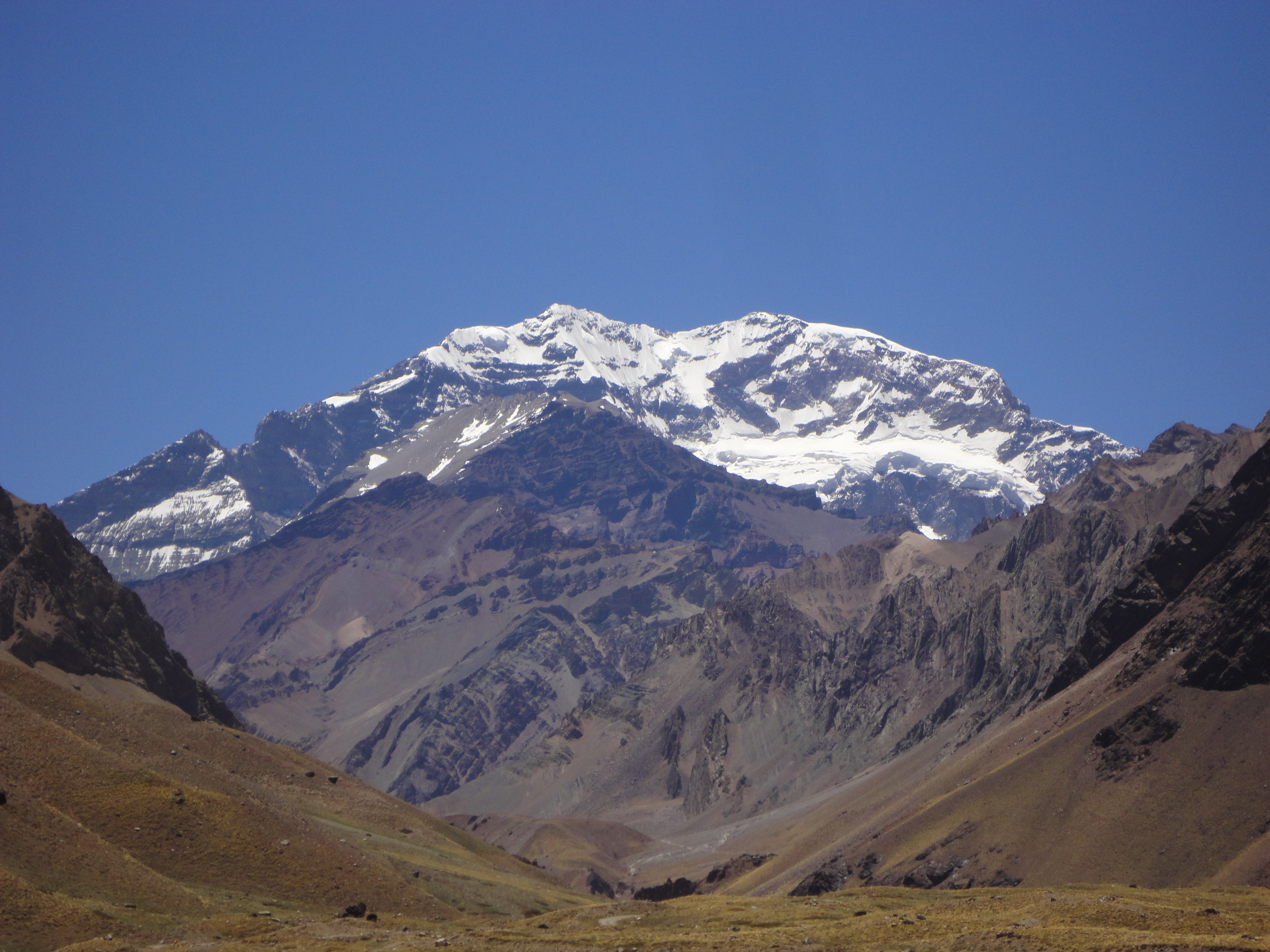
Aconcagua, Argentina.

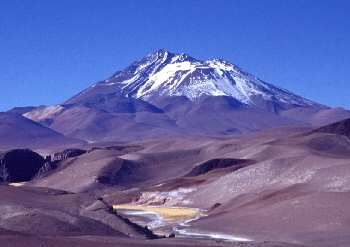
Monte Llullaillaco in 2006

No	Peak	Country	Elevation (m)	Prominence (m)	Col (m)
1	Aconcagua	Argentina	6,962	6,962	0
2	Ojos del Salado	Argentina / Chile	6,893	3,688	3205
3	Mercedario	Argentina	6,700	3,333	3367
4	Cerro del Bolsón	Argentina	5,552	3,252	2300
5	El Melao	Argentina	4,150	2,907	1243
6	Nevado de Famatina	Argentina	6,097	2,767	3330
7	Cerro el Manchao	Argentina	4,575	2,714	1861
8	Mogote Corralitos	Argentina	3,160	2,466	694
9	Llullaillaco	Argentina / Chile	6,739	2,344	4395
10	Cerro Champaqui	Argentina	2,770	2,208	562
11	Cordillera de Ansilta	Argentina	5,887	2,205	3682
12	Nevado de Chañi	Argentina	5,930	2,166	3764
13	Nevado el Cachi	Argentina	6,380	2,146	4234
14	Monte Pissis	Argentina	6,795	2,145	4650
15	Majadita	Argentina	6,280	2,113	4167
16	Cerro Pircas	Argentina	4,380	2,070	2310
17	Socompa	Argentina / Chile	6,051	2,015	4036
18	Antofalla	Argentina	6,440	1,957	4483
19	Cerro Malcante	Argentina	5,100	1,917	3183
20	Cerro del Toro	Argentina / Chile	6,168	1,910	4258
21	Pular	Chile	6,233	1,898	4335
22	Aracar	Argentina	6,095	1,791	4304
23	Cerro Laguna Blanca	Argentina	6,012	1,778	4234
24	Copiapó	Chile	6,052	1,701	4351
25	Cerros de Pereyra	Argentina	2,640	1,690	950
26	Cumbres Calchaquies	Argentina	4,740	1,688	3052
27	Cerro El Cóndor	Argentina	6,414	1,660	4754
28	Nevado Queva	Argentina	6,140	1,635	4505
29	Cerro del Tambillo	Argentina	5,680	1,624	4056
30	Cerro Tebenquicho	Argentina	5,810	1,575	4238
31	Colanguil	Argentina	6,122	1,547	4575
32	Tres Quebradas	Argentina / Chile	6,239	1,518	4721
33	Incahuasi	Argentina / Chile	6,621	1,514	5107
34	Cerro Castillejos	Argentina	2,480	1,505	975

== Mid Argentina and Chile south of Aconcagua ==
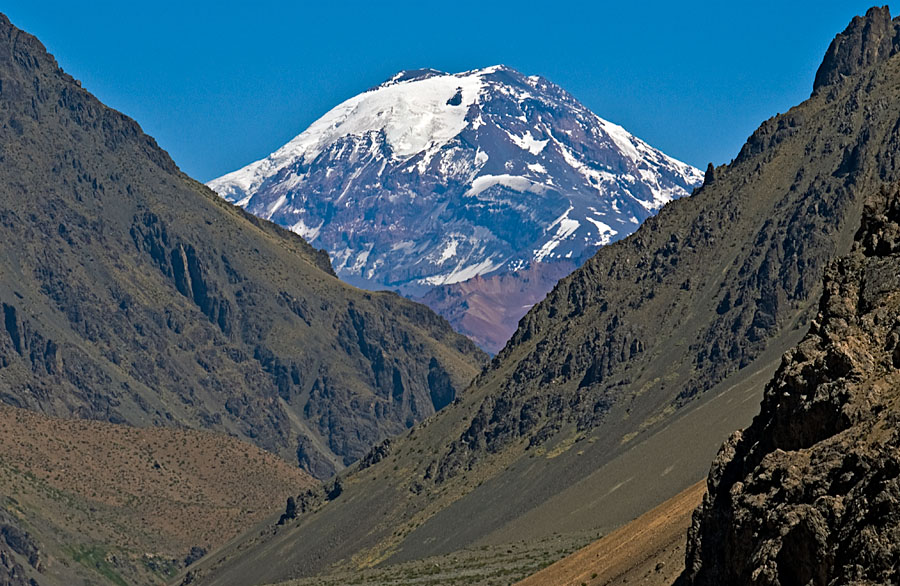
Tupungato, Argentina.

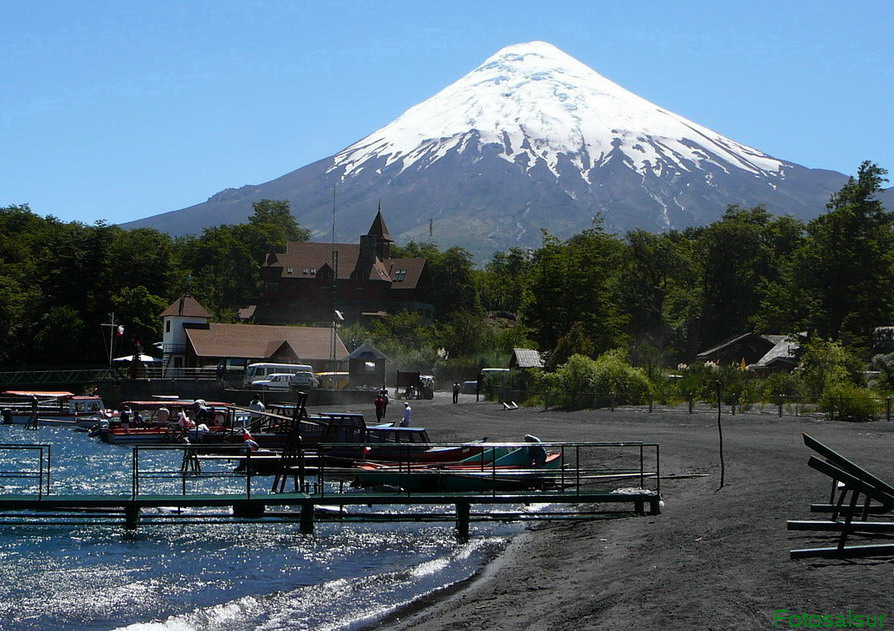
Osorno Volcano, Chile.

No	Peak	Country	Elevation (m)	Prominence (m)	Col (m)
1	Tupungato	Argentina / Chile	6,570	2,765	3805
2	Tronador	Argentina / Chile	3,470	2,642	828
3	Lanín	Argentina / Chile	3,740	2,624	1116
4	Cerro Nevado	Argentina	3,810	2,281	1529
5	Domuyo	Argentina	4,708	2,228	2480
6	Marmolejo	Argentina / Chile	6,108	2,105	4003
7	Cerro Payún	Argentina	3,838	1,954	1884
8	Calbuco	Chile	2,015	1,946	69
9	Sosneado	Argentina	5,189	1,936	3253
10	Osorno	Chile	2,661	1,898	763
11	Llaima	Chile	3,125	1,819	1306
12	Sierra Velluda	Chile	3,535	1,784	1751
13	Cerro Cantillana	Chile	2,281	1,784	497
14	Picos del Barroso	Chile	5,180	1,755	3425
15	Tromen	Argentina	3,980	1,721	2259
16	Cerro Risco Plateado	Argentina	4,999	1,602	3397
17	Mocho-Choshuenco	Chile	2,422	1,587	835
18	Planchón-Peteroa	Argentina / Chile	4,084	1,575	2509
19	Villarrica	Chile	2,860	1,575	1285
20	Nevado del Plomo	Argentina / Chile	6,070	1,550	4520
21	Cerro Castillo	Argentina / Chile	5,468	1,633	3835
22	Lonquimay	Chile	2,865	1,524	1341

== Northern Patagonia ==
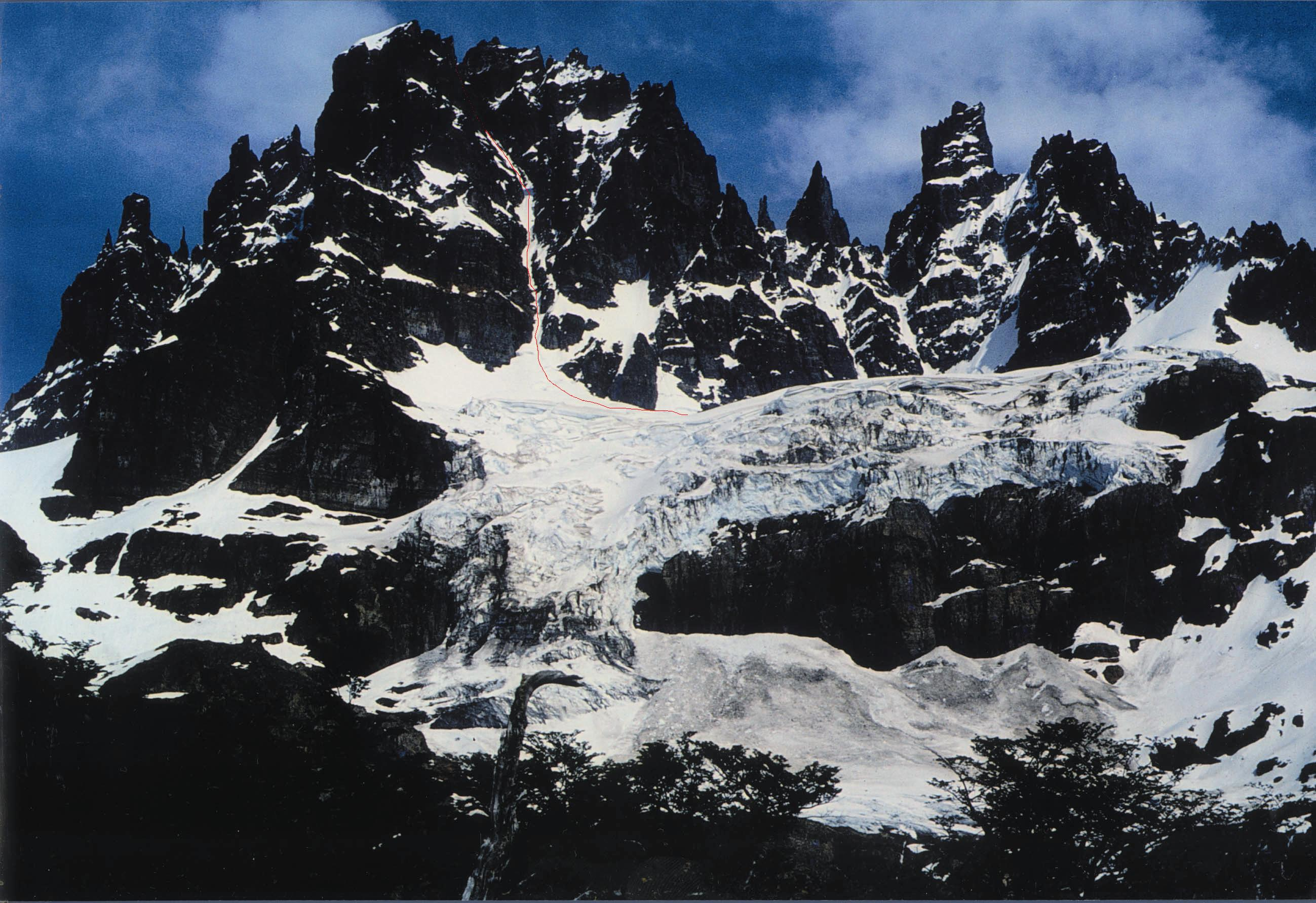
Cerro Castillo, Chile.

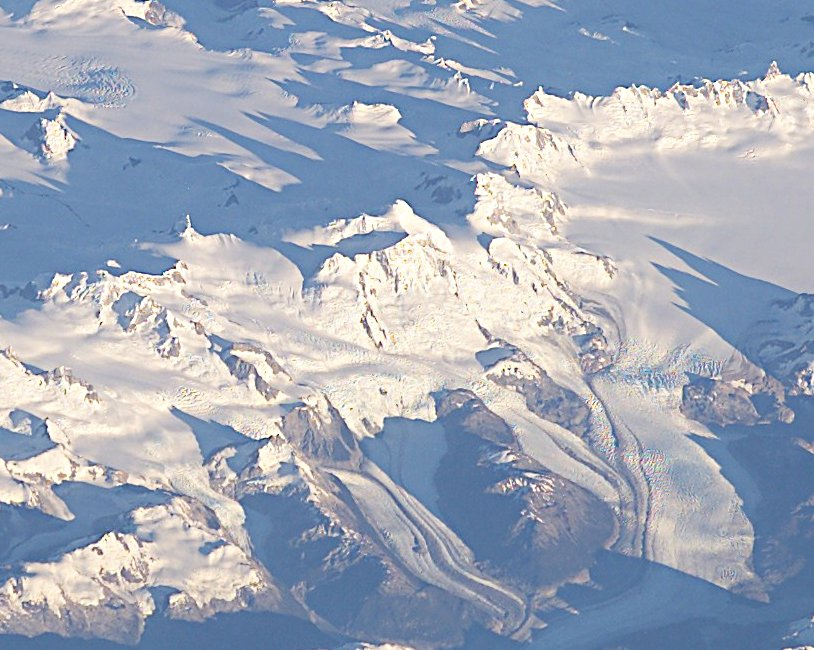
The pyramidal Cerro Arenales in the center of this NASA image

No	Peak	Country	Elevation (m)	Prominence (m)	Col (m)
1	Monte San Valentín	Chile	4,058	3,696	362
2	Monte San Lorenzo	Argentina / Chile	3,706	3,319	387
3	Melimoyu	Chile	2,440	2,272	168
4	Point 2390	Chile	2,390	2,239	151
5	Monte Zeballos	Argentina	2,700	2,228	472
6	Cerro Castillo	Chile	2,675	2,088	587
7	Cerro Macá	Chile	2,300	2,066	234
8	Cerro Arenales	Chile	3,437	1,900	1537
9	Macizo Nevado	Chile	2,100	1,840	260
10	Cerro Anexo	Argentina / Chile	2,480	1,799	681
11	Cordillera Cristal	Chile	2,360	1,776	584
12	Nevado Queulat	Chile	2,300	1,738	562
13	Cerro Elefantes	Chile	2,000	1,671	329
14	Cerro Barros Arana	Chile	2,286	1,645	641
15	Cerro Huemules	Chile	1,910	1,634	276
16	Cordón Los Ñadis	Chile	1,780	1,622	158
17	Mentolat	Chile (Magdalena Island)	1,620	1,620	0
18	Cerro Penitentes	Argentina	2,943	1,612	1331
19	Cerro Situación	Chile	2,250	1,610	640
20	Cerro Puño	Chile	2,200	1,590	610
21	Cerro Aguja Sur	Argentina / Chile	2,230	1,564	641
22	Cerro de la Paloma	Chile	1,995	1,559	436
23	Cordón Soler	Chile	2,150	1,557	593
24	Cerro Cónico	Argentina / Chile	2,271	1,544	727
25	Point 1830	Chile	1,830	1,541	289
26	Cerro Desfiladero	Chile	2,300	1,527	773
27	Minchinmávida	Chile	2,450	1,518	932
28	Tres Hermanos	Chile	2,010	1,513	497
29	Cerro Cuatro Puntas	Chile	1,810	1,507	303

== Southern Patagonia ==
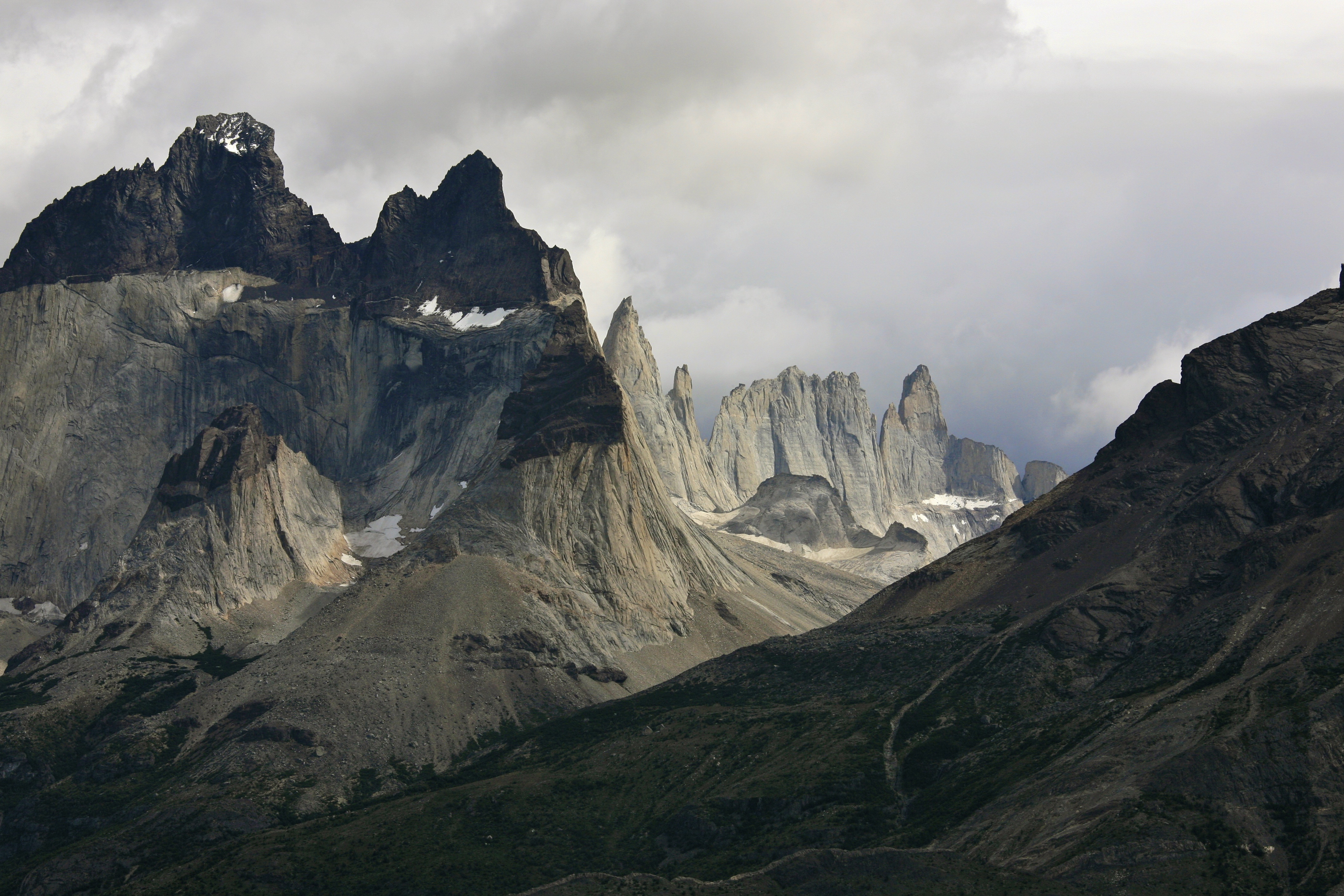
Torres del Paine, Chile.

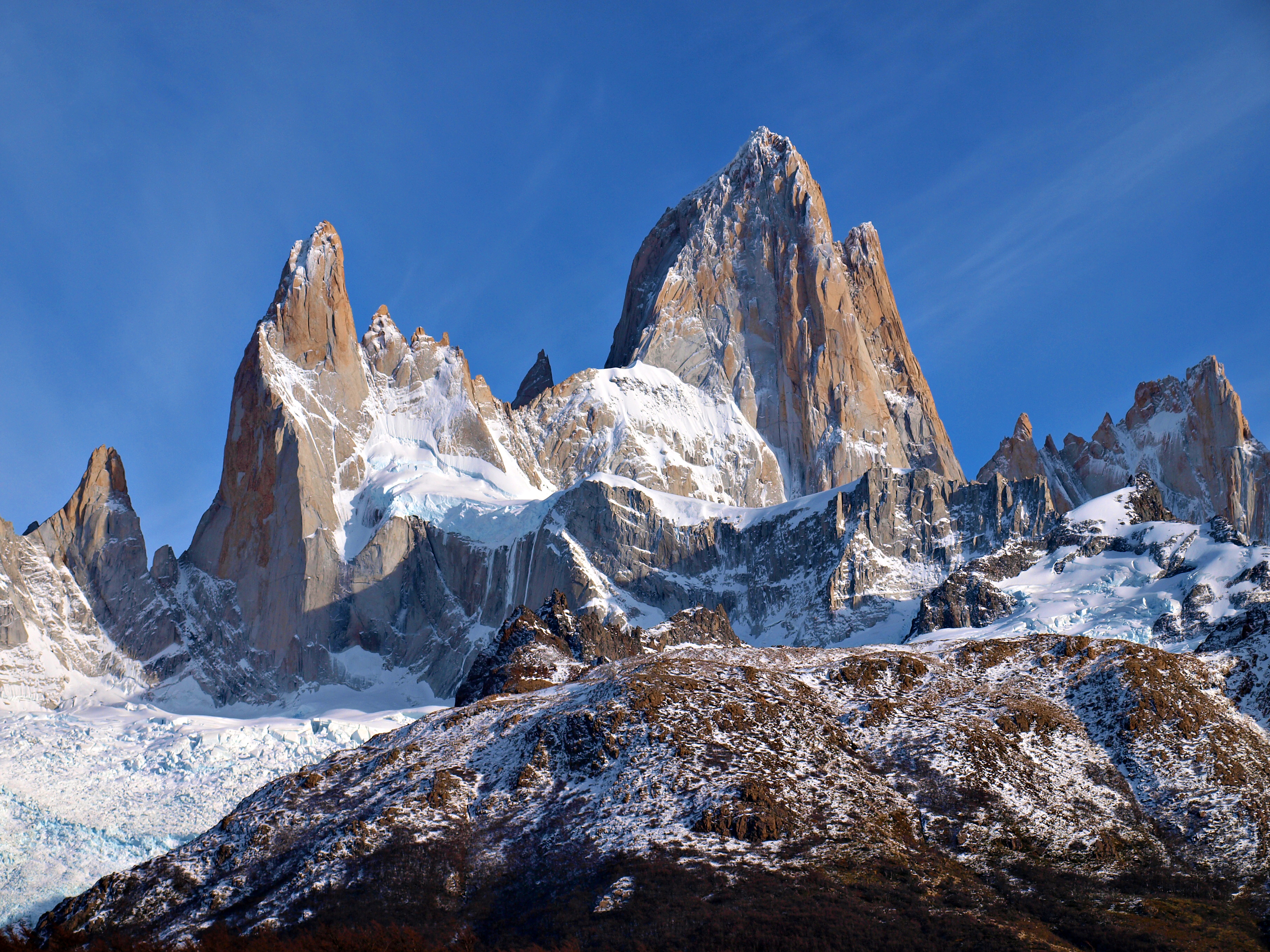
Monte Fitz Roy, Argentina/Chile

No	Peak	Country	Elevation (m)	Prominence (m)	Col (m)
1	Lautaro	Chile	3,580	3,302	278
2	Mount Darwin	Chile (Tierra del Fuego)	2,580	2,580	0
3	Cerro Paine Grande	Chile	2,884	2,197	687
4	Monte Sarmiento	Chile (Tierra del Fuego)	2,187	2,040	147
5	Cerro Norte	Argentina	2,730	1,624	1106
6	Monte Fitz Roy	Argentina / Chile	3,405	1,951	1454
7	Cerro Steffen	Chile	3,300	1,945	1355
8	Monte Balmaceda	Chile	2,035	1,885	150
9	Cerro Pináculo	Argentina	2,160	1,879	281
10	Cerro Tres Frailes	Chile	2,050	1,748	302
11	Cordón Mariano Moreno	Argentina / Chile	3,490	1,735	1755
12	Pascua	Chile	2,250	1,732	518
13	Cerro Ladrillero	Chile (Riesco Island)	1,705	1,705	0
14	Cerro Roma	Argentina / Chile	3,270	1,694	1576
15	Dama Blanca	Chile	1,925	1,626	299
16	Cerro Mesón	Argentina	2,636	1,688	948
17	Gran Campo Nevado	Chile	1,640	1,605	35
18	Cerro Pietrobelli	Argentina / Chile	2,850	1,600	1250
19	Cerro Tenerife	Chile	1,590	1,539	51
20	Península Videau	Chile	1,580	1,534	46
21	HP Isla Wellington	Chile (Isla Wellington)	1,520	1,520	0
22	Sierra de Sangra	Argentina / Chile	2,200	1,507	693
23	Monte Burney	Chile	1,520	1,507	13
