= Cerro El Toro =

Mountain in Argentina

- Location within Chile

Highest point
- Elevation: 6,168 m (20,236 ft)
- Prominence: 1,842 m (6,043 ft)
- Parent peak: Majadita
- Listing: Ultra
- Coordinates: 29°07′48″S 69°47′12″W

Geography
- Location: Argentina – Chile
- Parent range: Andes

Climbing
- First ascent: Incan ascent and first modern ascent 26 February 1964 — Antonio Beorchia Nigris (Italy), Jorge Enrique Varas and Sergio Fernandez (Argentina)

Cerro El Toro is a mountain in the Andes located on the border between Argentina and Chile. It has an elevation of 6,168 metres (20,236 ft) above sea level. Its territory is within the Argentinean protection areas of Provincial Reserve San Guillermo. The Argentinean side is at San Juan province, commune of Iglesia. Chilean side is at the Huasco province, and commune of Alto del Carmen.

== First ascents ==
Toro was first climbed by Incas in unknown dates. A mummy was found on the Argentine slopes in 1964. The first recorded post-colonization ascent was by Antonio Beorchia Nigris (Italy), Jorge Enrique Varas and Sergio Fernandez (Argentina) in 02/26/1964.

== Elevation ==
Its official height is 6,160 m (20,210 ft). Other data from available digital elevation models: SRTM yields 6,148 m (20,171 ft), ASTER 6,122 m (20,085 ft) and TanDEM-X 6,184 m (20,289 ft). The height of the nearest key col is 4,326 m (14,193 ft), leading to a topographic prominence of 1,842 m (6,043 ft). Toro is considered a Mountain Range according to the Dominance System, with a dominance of 29.86%. Its parent peak is Majadita and the Topographic isolation is 143.4 km (89.1 mi).

== See also ==
- List of mountains in the Andes
- List of Ultras of South America
