= Tomasamil =

Mountain in Bolivia

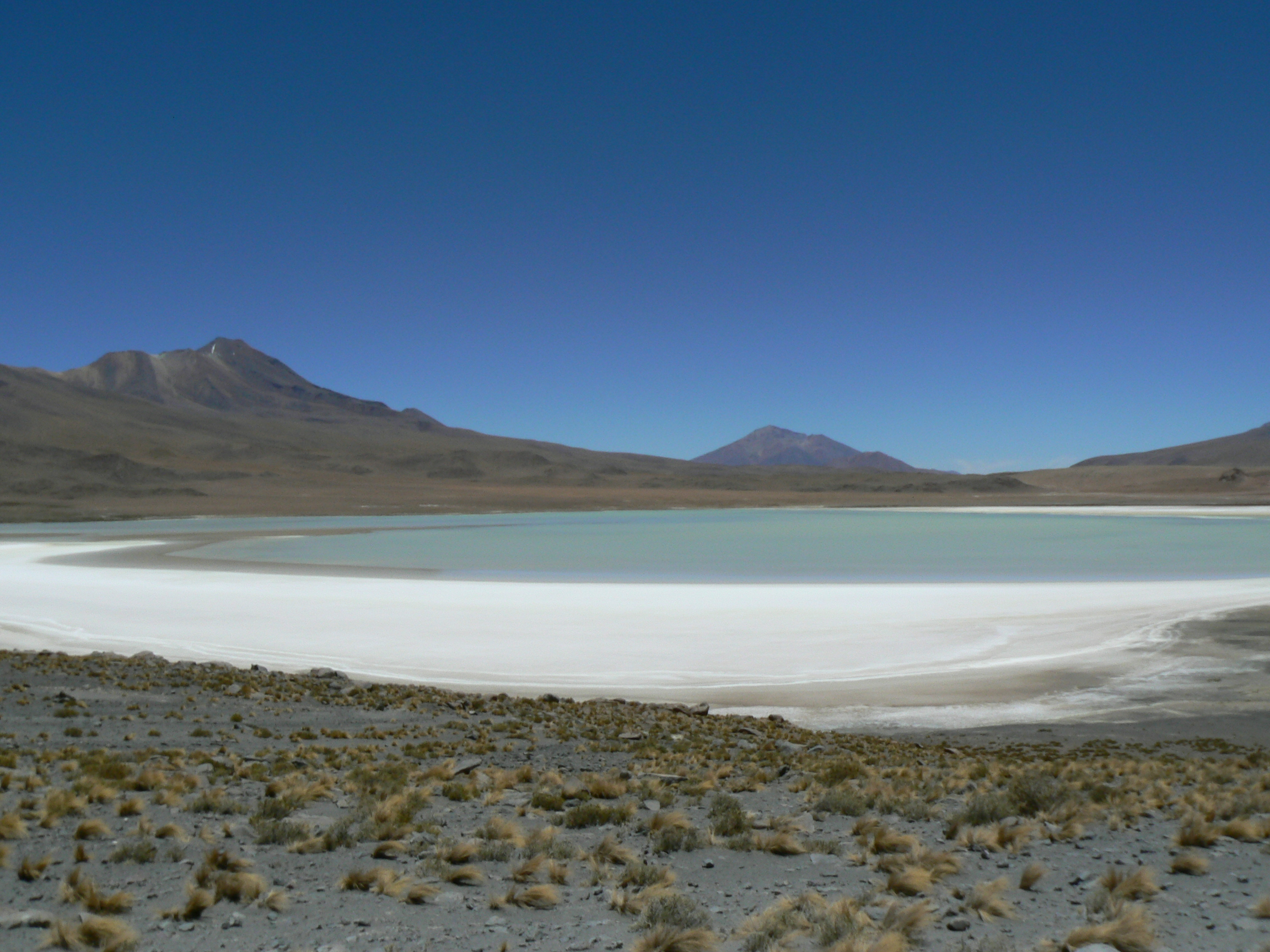
- Laguna Hedionda with the mountains Cañapa (left) and Tomasamil (right).

Highest point
- Elevation: 5,890 m (19,320 ft)
- Prominence: 1,590 m (5,220 ft)
- Listing: Ultra
- Coordinates: 21°18′S 67°58′W

Geography
- Location within Bolivia
- Location: Potosi, Bolivia
- Parent range: Cordillera Occidental

Tomasamil (Spanish: Cerro Tomasamil) is a highly eroded dormant volcano in south-west Bolivia, located inland from the Atacama Desert of coastal Chile. It is located about 150km south-west of the famous Salar de Uyuni salt flats and is also relatively close to the Salar de Chiguana. It is also located 6 km east of Ollagüe, another extinct ultra prominent peak on the Chile-Bolivia border. Due to its location, the peak of Tomasamil often has little to no snow. However, this is a relatively recent phenomenon, as in previous years Tomasamil often had enough precipitation for the peak to be snow-capped. The area around the mountain is dominated by pockets of occasional shrub and exposed dirt, along with expansive salt flats, typical of the region it is located in. On the lower parts of Tomasamil animals such as the vicuña, a relative of the llama, and plants such as the yareta, a plant found on high elevation areas throughout the Andes can be found.

== Gallery ==
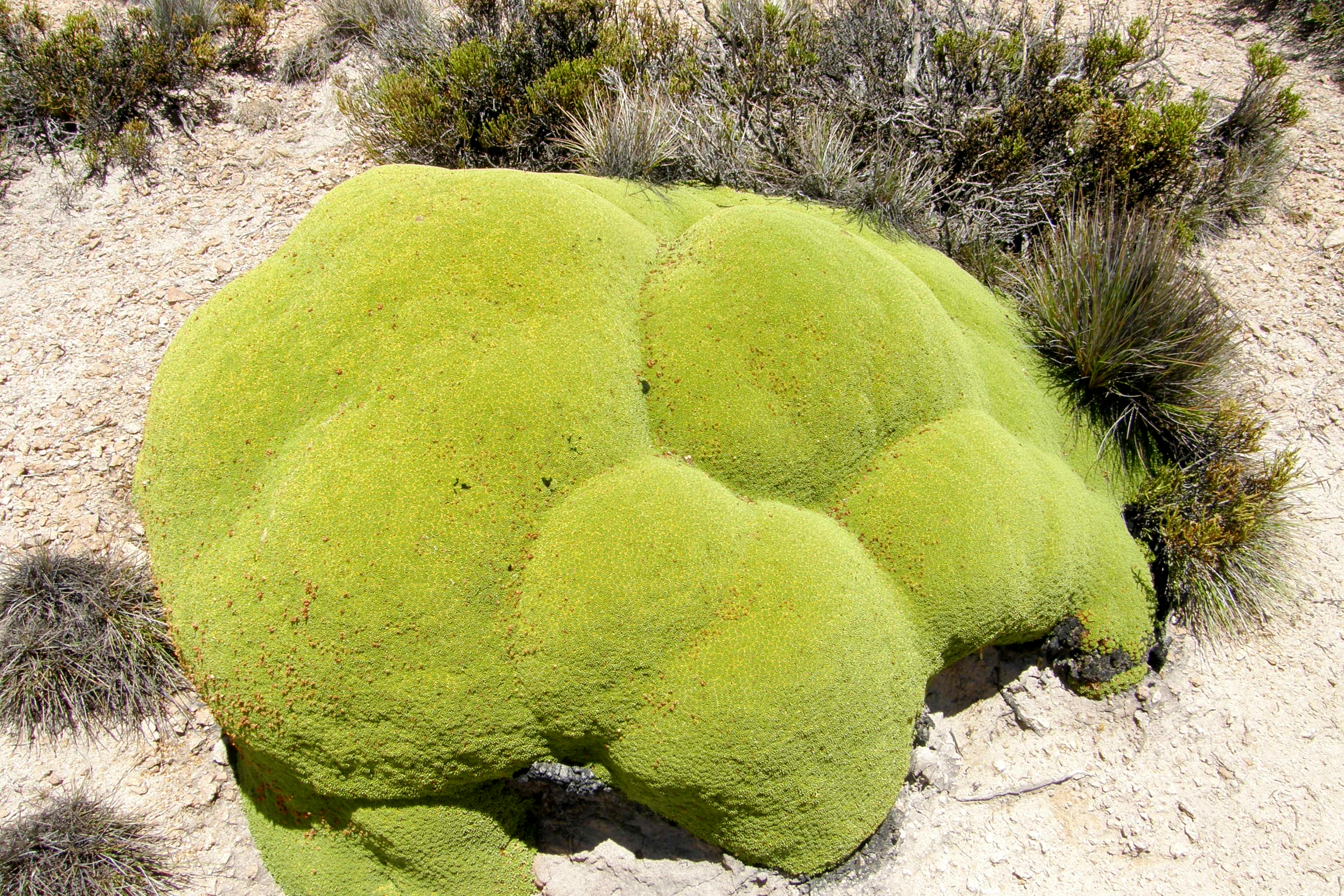
An example of a yareta plant found in Lauca National Park, Chile

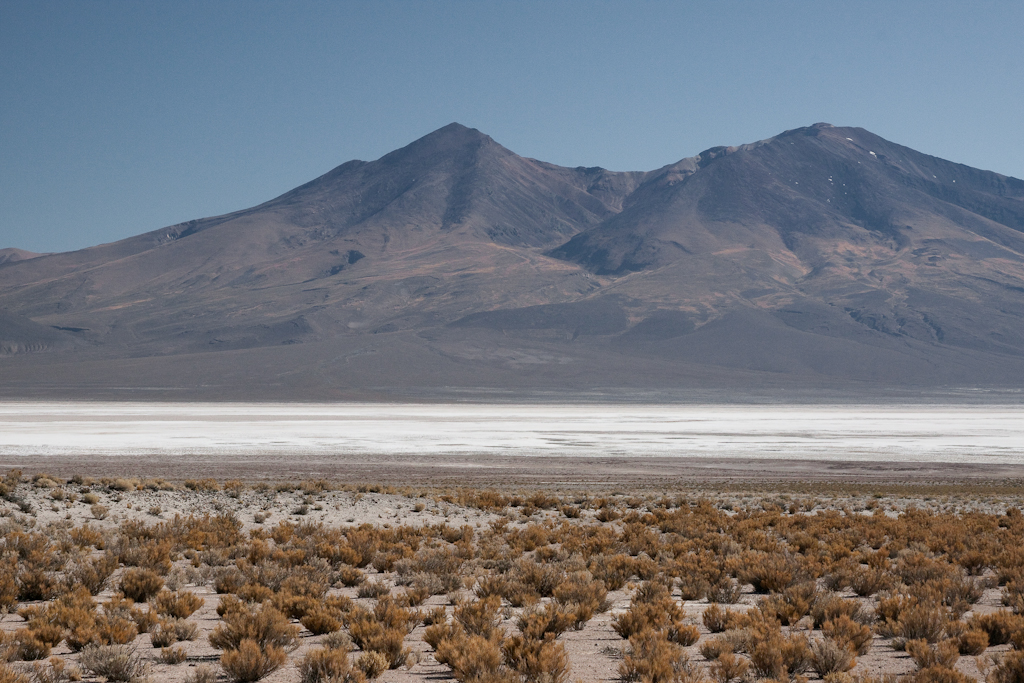
Salar de Chiguana

== See also ==
- List of Ultras of South America
