= Tristeza =

Tristeza may refer to:

- Tristeza, Rio Grande do Sul
- Cerro Tristeza, Mt Tristeza
- Tristeza (virus), citrus virus
- Tristeza (band), American instrumental band
- "Tristeza", 1966 instrumental by Lobo and Nitinho, song version covered by Sérgio Mendes on Look Around
- Tristeza, album and title track by Baden Powell (guitarist) 1976
