= Cerro Castillo =

Mountain in Chile

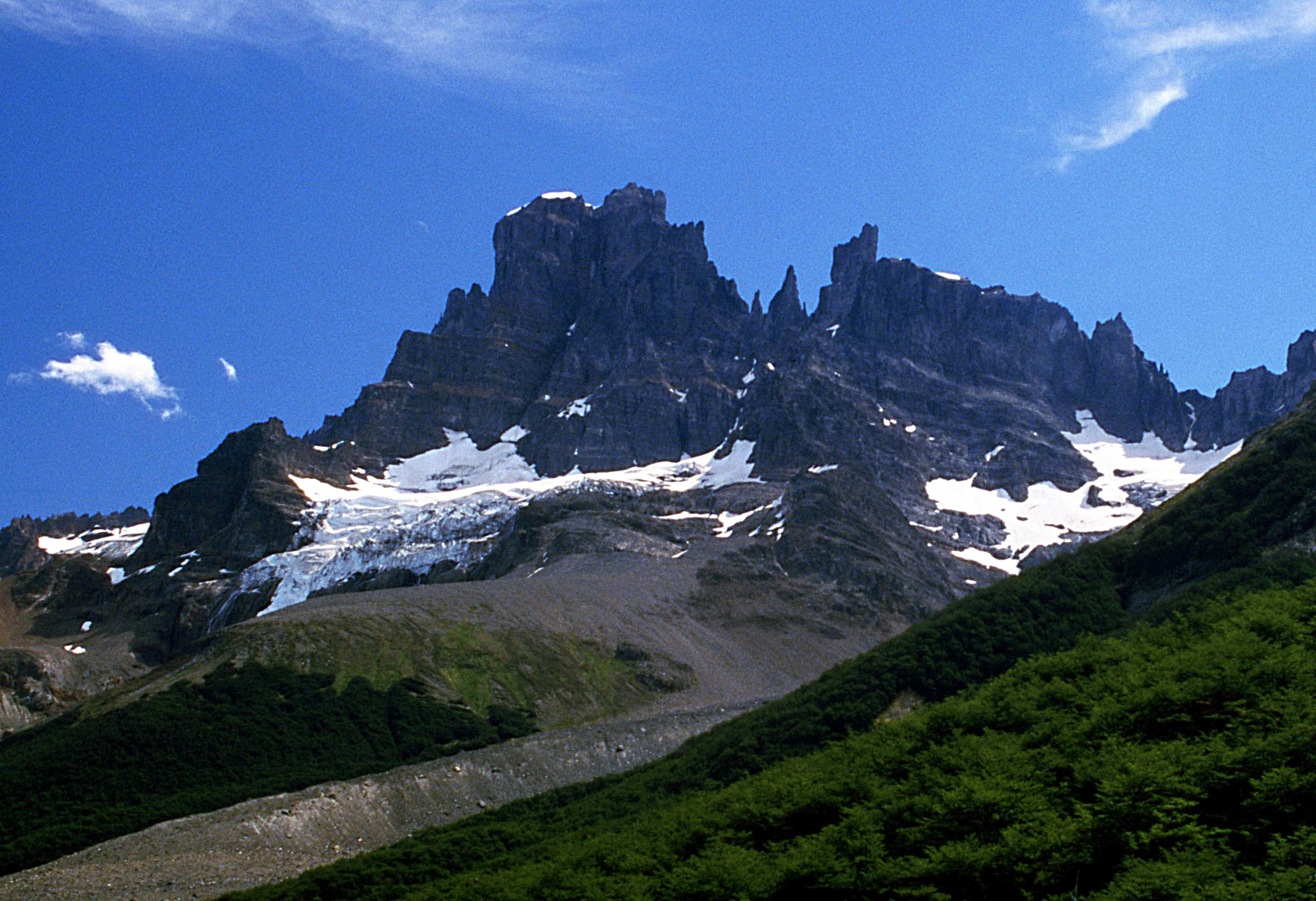
- Cerro Castillo viewed from East, Feb 2002

Highest point
- Elevation: 2,675 m (8,776 ft)
- Prominence: 2,088 m (6,850 ft)
- Listing: Ultra
- Coordinates: 46°03′54″S 72°12′27″W

Geography
- Location within Chile
- Location: Chile
- Parent range: Andes
- Topo map: IGM J 10 (Villa Cerro Castillo) 1:50,000

Geology
- Mountain type: Igneous rock

Climbing
- Easiest route: ice/rock climb

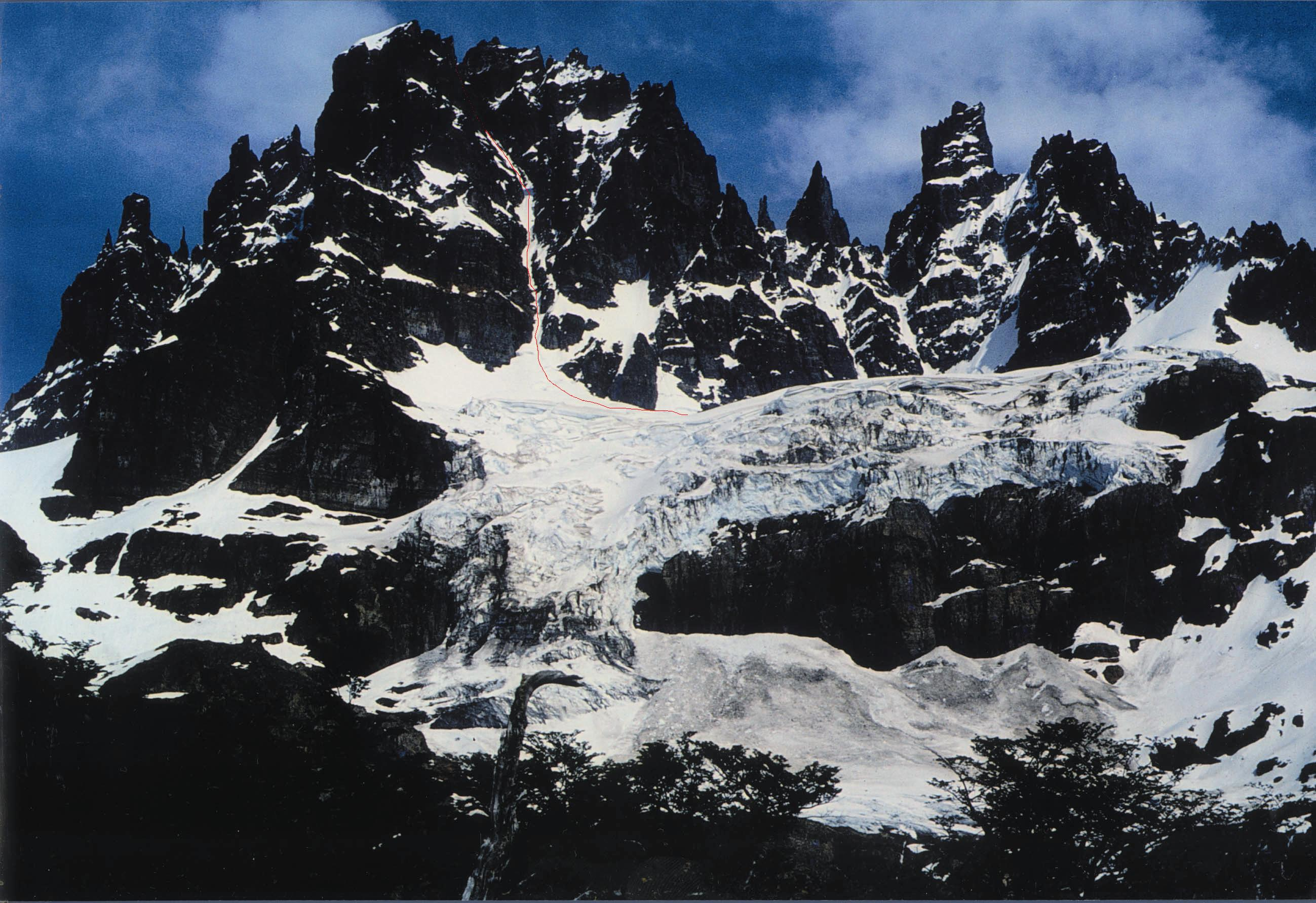

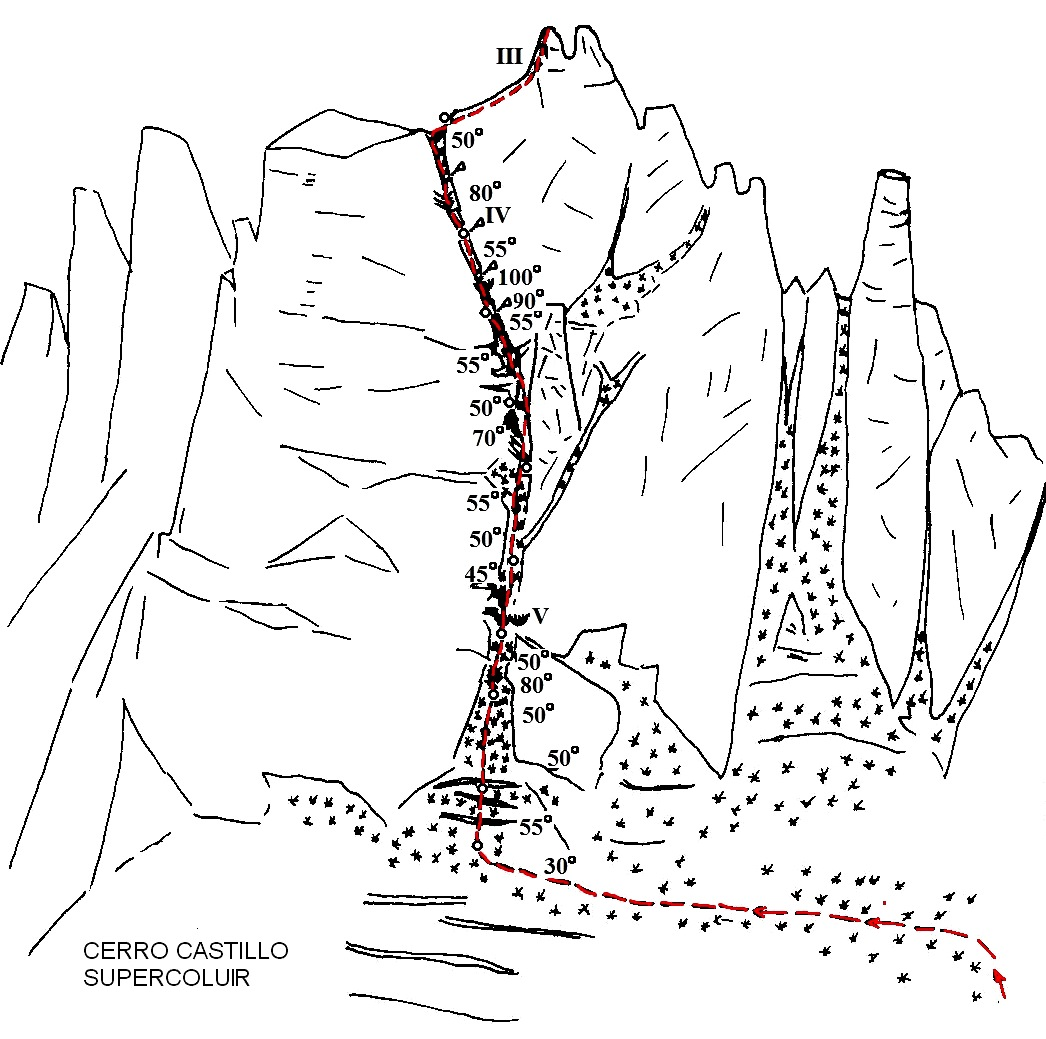

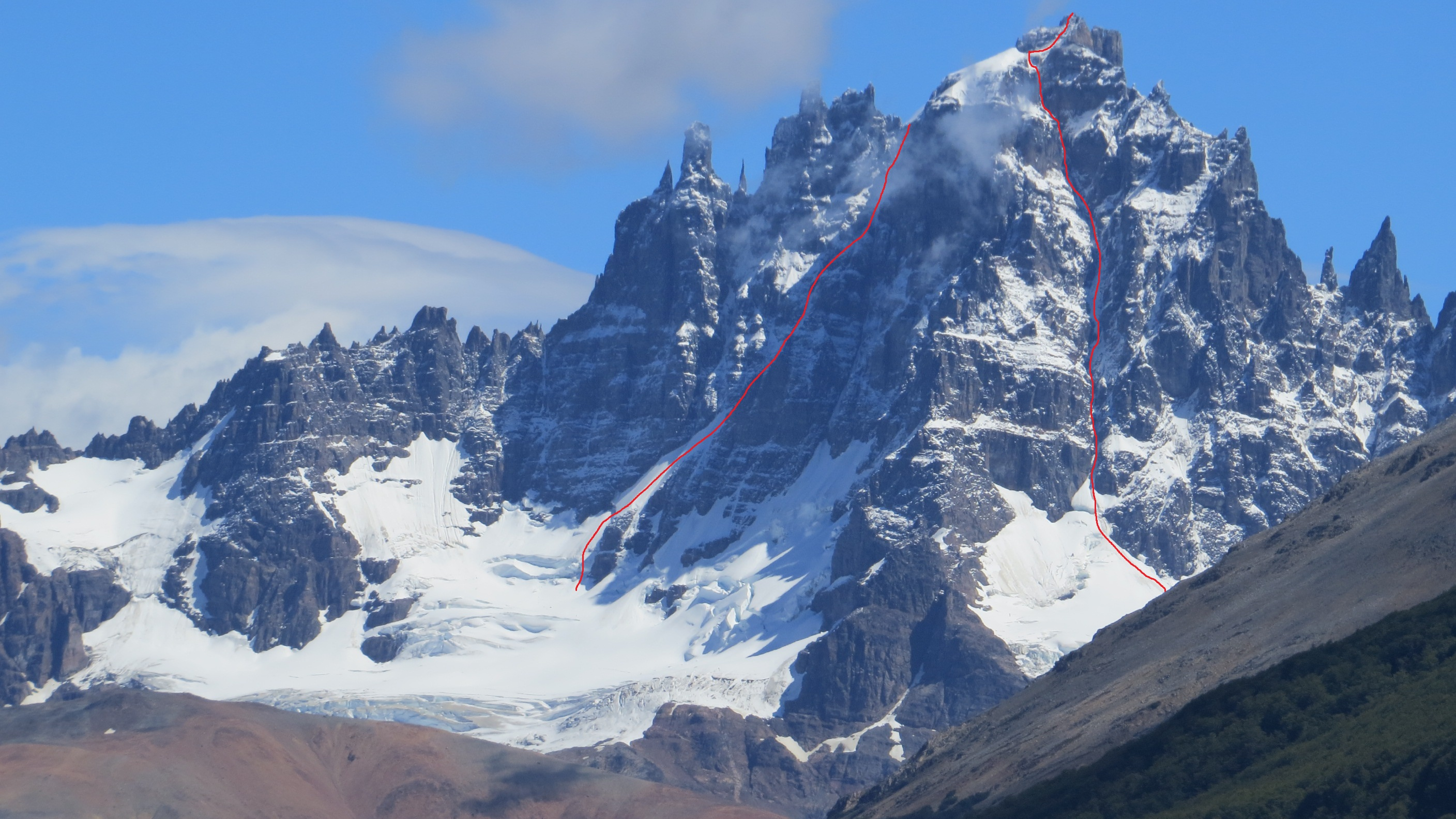

Cerro Castillo is a jagged rocky peak located in the Aysén del General Carlos Ibáñez del Campo Region of Chile, within the Cerro Castillo National Park. Castillo means castle in Spanish, and the steep basalt walls of the mountain indeed make it look like one. On its sides are a few small glaciers and lakes fed by them.

== Approach ==
Cerro Castillo is 75 kilometres (47 mi) south of the city of Coyhaique along Carretera Austral. There is a small village Villa Cerro Castillo just off the road. The base of the mountain can be approached from the road in one day along Estero Parada river. An alternative is the excellent 4-day hike that starts on a spot called Las Horquetas Grandes on Carretera Austral, goes through forests, has two river crossings (no bridges), and goes over a 1,400 metres (4,600 ft) mountain pass adjacent to the rock walls of Cerro Castillo. The area is remote and sees less than one hiking party per day during the season.

== Climbing ==
First ascent: February 10, 1966, a party of Chilean university students Gastón Oyarzun, Osvaldo Latorre, Antonio Marcel and Raúl Aguilera climb north (north east) side gully.

Second ascent: February 4, 1976 Nick Groves (GB) with Mike Searle and New Zealand climbers Tom Clarkson, John Mayrick and Lauchi Duff repeated Chilean route and finished a 20 metres (66 ft) under the summit.

Third ascent: December 5, 1982 Yugoslavs Tone Golnar and Ljubo Hansel, New Zealander David Waugh and South Korean Chil Kyou Son teamed together to make the first ascent of the southeast face of Cerro Castillo. The route followed a 55° ice couloir (in places much steeper) in the center of the face. The descent required sixteen 50 m rappels.V, 90°/IV, 50-80°, 700 (1,400 metres (4,600 ft)),6 h (10 h).

Next ascents: On January 26, 1987 Gino Buscaini and Silvia Metzeltin Buscaini climbed an 800-metre (2,600 ft) high, snow-and-ice couloir which had an angle of 55° in the upper part of the west face of Cerro Castillo (Coyhaiquel; 2,670 metres (8,760 ft)) in Chile. We climbed the whole couloir to the col (2,570 metres (8,430 ft)) on the summit ridge. They did not continue on to the summit because of a snow storm.

October 2003, first repetition of supercouloir on southeast wall Chilean climbers Pablo Crovetto, Rodrigo Fica and Spanish companion Eduardo Mondragón.

October 2008, first ascent of couloir central east face (600m. VI, 5.9, WI4, M4) by Carlos Buhler and Joan Sole. They descended via the north side gully.

== Gallery ==
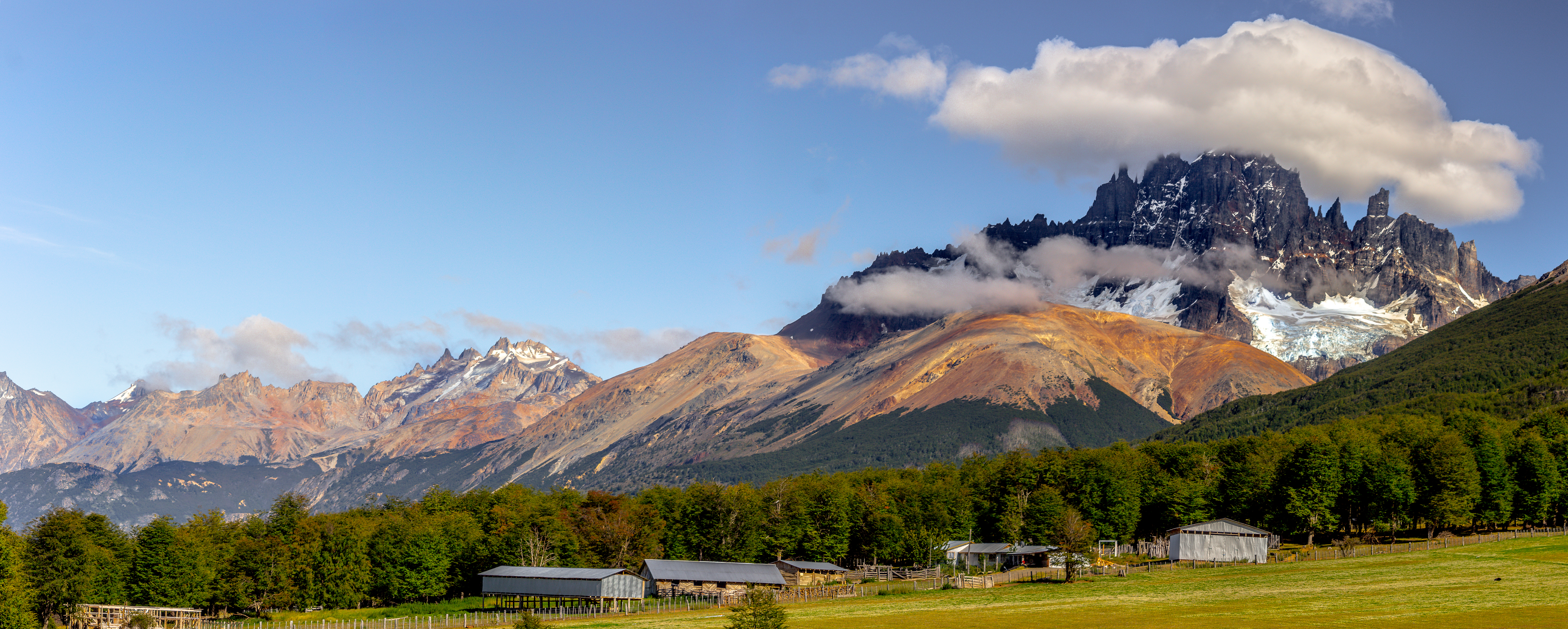
View of Cerro Castillo from Route 7, looking Northwest

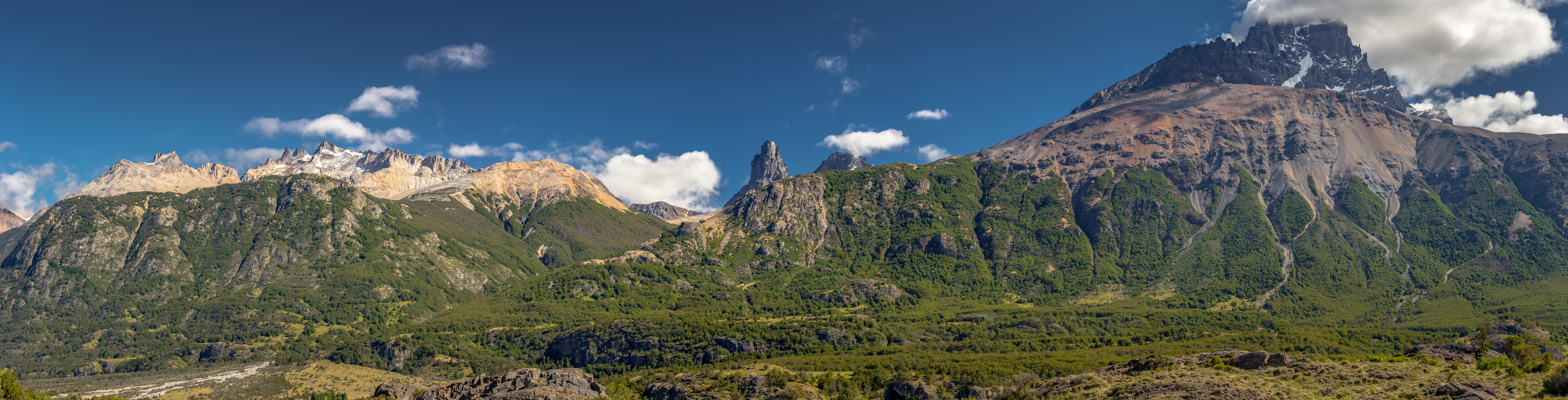
Surroundings of the Cerro Castillo peak, looking North

== See also ==
- List of Ultras of South America
