= Los Patos =

Volcano on the Argentina–Chile border

- Tres Quebradas
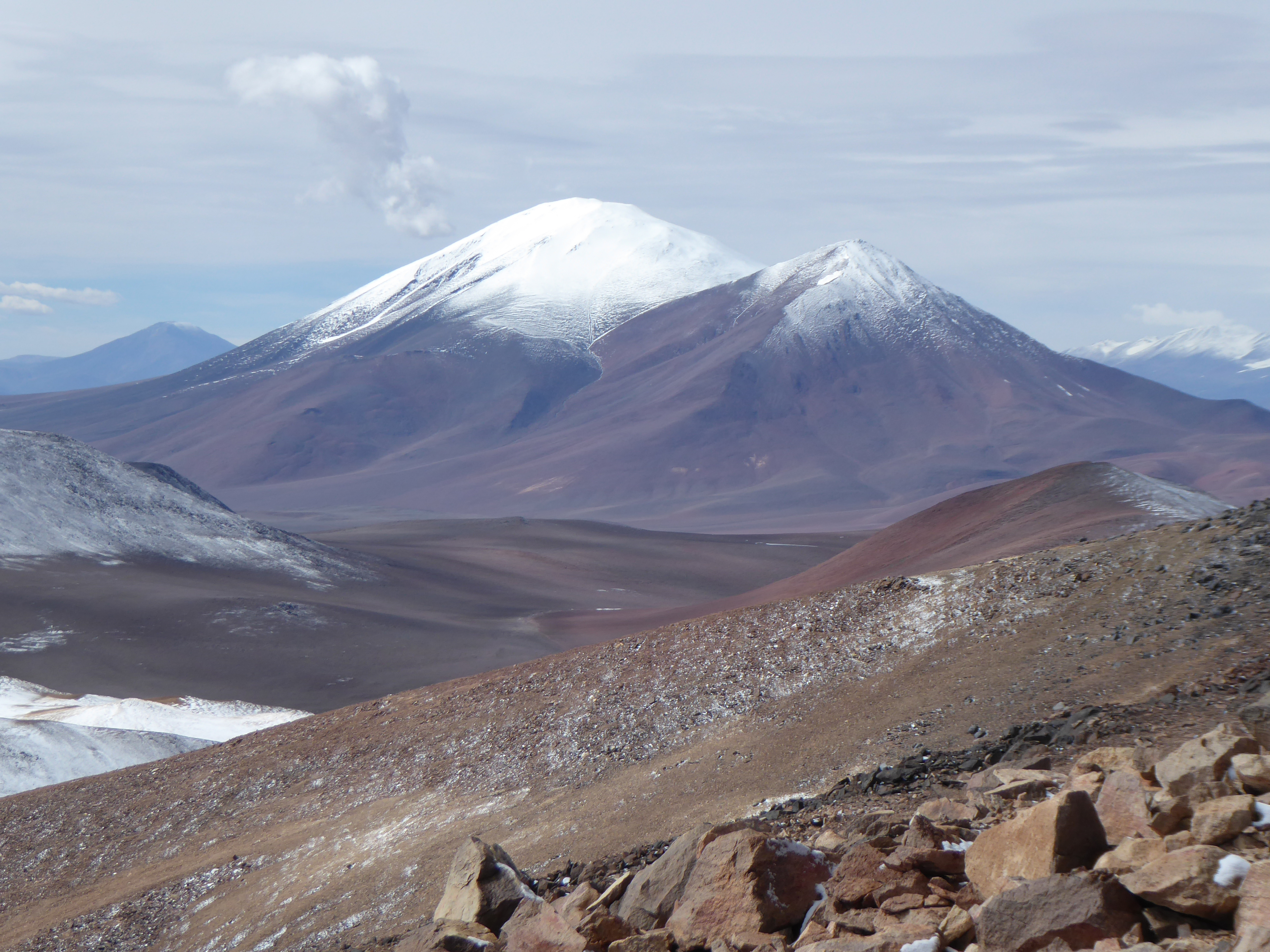
- Tres Quebradas from the northwest (Chilean side)

Highest point
- Elevation: 6,239 m (20,469 ft)
- Prominence: 1,518 m (4,980 ft)
- Listing: Ultra
- Coordinates: 27°18′00″S 68°48′30″W

Geography
- Location within Argentina
- Location: Catamarca, Argentina - Atacama, Chile
- Parent range: Andes

Los Patos (also known as Tres Quebradas) is a mountain in the Andes mountain range of South America. The peak is located on the international border of the Catamarca Province of Argentina and the Atacama Region of Chile. It has a summit elevation of 6,239 metres (20,469 ft).

Los Patos is a volcano. Potassium-argon dating on dacite taken from the northern flank showed an age of 4,550,000 ± 180,000 years ago. At that time, volcanic activity in the Maricunga Belt had just ended and was shifting towards the area of Ojos del Salado and Nevado Tres Cruces. Another date obtained on the lower part of the volcano is 7,600,000 ± 600,000 years ago. The base of Nevado Tres Cruces rises immediately east of Los Patos. Los Patos is part of the Cordillera Sundt, a mountain chain containing stratovolcanoes with lava domes and lava flows. The chain is constructed by dacite and smaller amounts of andesite. Other volcanoes in the chain include Falso Azufre, Monte Pissis and Mulas Muertas. So-called "Pircas Negras" lavas with compositions similar to adakite have been found on the northern flanks of Los Patos. They contain amphibole and clinopyroxene as the dominant minerals and some samples have been found at 27.251°S 68.792°W and 27.278°S 68.784°W. The volcano has a prehistoric sanctuary on its summit.

== See also ==
- List of mountains in the Andes
- List of Ultras of South America
