= Nevado de Chañi =

Mountain in Argentina

- Location within Argentina

Highest point
- Elevation: 5,930 m (19,460 ft)
- Prominence: 2,166 m (7,106 ft)
- Listing: Ultra
- Coordinates: 24°03′48″S 65°44′45″W

Geography
- Location: Junjuy, Argentina
- Parent range: Andes

Nevado de Chañi is a mountain in the Andes of the Jujuy Province in Argentina. It has a height of 5,949 metres. It lies at about 50 km northwest of San Salvador de Jujuy.

The Nevado de Chañi is a compact mountain group located between the meridians of longitude West 65º42’ and 65º48’ and the parallels of latitude South 24º00’ and 24º10’. The main summit (according to the last available surveys) is 5,949m (24º03’S and 65º44’W) and it is the highest point in the province of Jujuy. There is some confusion about the height of the mountain. Official, but old, official surveys from the Argentine IGM (the military geographic institute) give a height of 6,200 which is an exaggeration. Some more recent surveys give about 5,900. The height of 5,949 has been measured many times with modern global positioning systems by summiteers since the early 2000s.

Nevado de Chañi is the physical limit between the provinces of Jujuy and Salta. Many peaks higher than 5,000m are part of the group, such as the Cerro Paño (5.517 m) and Nevado del Castillo (5.565 m). The highest summit of Nevado de Chañi is named Cumbre General Belgrano. The normal route to the main summit is by the east side and is technically easy. On the south face there are challenging routes on mixed ground (D to TD) with some interesting Scottish climbing. The mountain is frequently climbed by its normal route but on the south face there have been only 5 or 6 recorded ascents as of July 2007. This mountain group is made of relatively compact granite, the only exception in the North of Argentina. Several technical routes waiting for a first ascents are located in the area.

== See also ==
- List of mountains in the Andes
- List of Ultras of South America
