= Cerro Castillo National Park =

National park in Chile

- IUCN category II (national park)
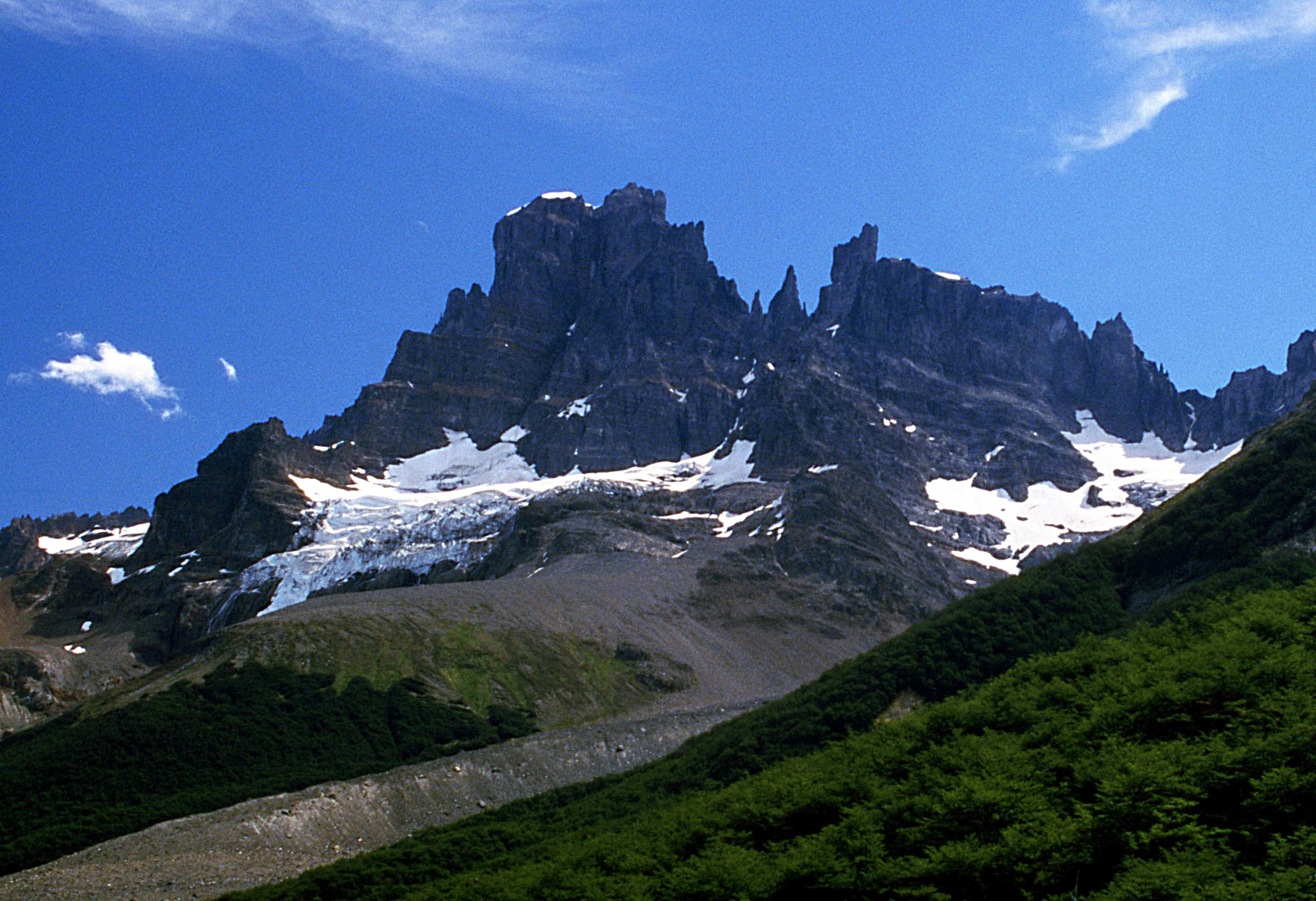
- Interactive map of Cerro Castillo National Park
- Location: Aysén del General Carlos Ibáñez del Campo Region, Chile
- Nearest city: Balmaceda
- Coordinates: 46°03′S 72°11′W
- Area: 1,795.5 km^{2}
- Established: 1970 national reserve, 2018 national park
- Governing body: Corporación Nacional Forestal

Cerro Castillo National Park is a nature reserve of Chile located in the Aysén del General Carlos Ibáñez del Campo Region, south of Coyhaique. The park is named after Cerro Castillo, its highest mountain and main attraction. The Carretera Austral passes through the park.

== History ==
Named a national reserve in 1970, Cerro Castillo was recategorized a National Park as part of an agreement between the Chilean government, under President Michelle Bachelet and Tompkins Conservation in 2018.

== Ecology ==
Mammals in the park include the endangered South Andean deer, guanacos, pumas, chingue (Molina’s hog-nosed skunk), and canines of the genus Lycalopex. Notable birds that inhabit in the area are the Andean condor and black-chested buzzard eagles in the mountains, and austral parakeets, thorn-tailed rayaditos, Magellanic woodpeckers, churrín del sur (Magellanic tapaculo), and the chucao tapaculo. Lenga and ñirre are the most common tree species in the reserve, though evergreen species like the coigüe de Magallanes are also present.

The northern portion of the park is part of Aisén River drainage basin, whereas that the southern portion is included in the basin area of Ibáñez River.

=== Rewilding ===
Cerro Castillio National Park is a key part of the National Huemul Corridor, a public-private initiative that seeks to reestablish the huemul population using wildlife corridors in key conservation areas along the Route of Parks of Patagonia. Partners for this project include Rewilding Chile and CONAF.
