= Colanguil =

Mountain in Argentina

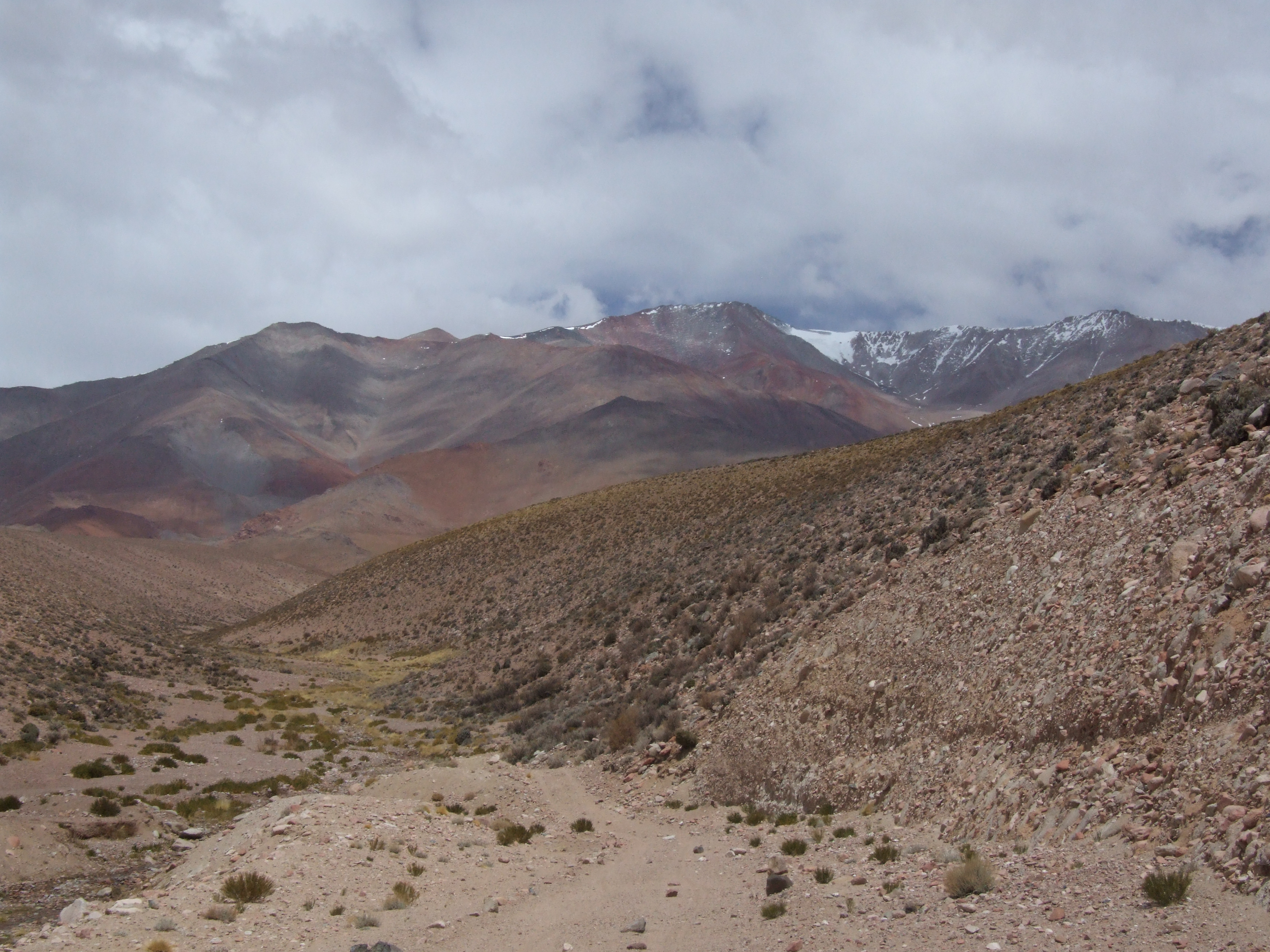
- Colangüil as seen from the northeast

Highest point
- Elevation: 6,122 m (20,085 ft)
- Prominence: 1,547 metres (5,075 ft)
- Parent peak: Majadita
- Coordinates: 29°35′20.75″S 069°26′57.12″W

Geography
- Location within Argentina
- Country: Argentina
- Parent range: Central Andes, Andes

Climbing
- First ascent: 15/12/1994 - Pedro Rosell and Humberto Campodónico (Argentina)

Colanguil or Colangüil is a peak in Argentina with an elevation of 6,122 metres (20,085 ft) metres, the highest at Sierra de Colanguil. Its territory is within the Argentinean protection areas of Provincial Reserve San Guillermo, located within the territory of the Argentinean province of San Juan, city of Iglesia.

== First Ascent ==
Colanguil was first climbed by Pedro Rosell (Argentina) and Humberto Campodónico (Argentina) on 15 December 1994.

== Elevation ==
Other data from available digital elevation models: SRTM yields 6100 metres, ASTER 6076 metres, ALOS 6076 metres and TanDEM-X 6133 metres. The height of the nearest key col is 4575 meters, leading to a topographic prominence of 1547 meters. Colanguil is considered a Mountain Range according to the Dominance System and its dominance is 25.27%. Its parent peak is Majadita and the Topographic isolation is 97.8 kilometers.
