= Cerro del Bolsón =

Mountain in Argentina

- Location within Argentina

Highest point
- Elevation: 5,552 m (18,215 ft)
- Prominence: 3,252 m (10,669 ft); Ranked 69th
- Listing: Ultra
- Coordinates: 27°12′51″S 66°05′39″W

Naming
- English translation: Mountain of the Hollow (or Cirque/Coombe)
- Language of name: Spanish

Geography
- Location: Tucumán, Catamarca, Argentina
- Parent range: Aconquija Range

Climbing
- First ascent: 1893 by Rodolfo Hauthal

Cerro del Bolsón is a mountain in the Aconquija Range of Argentina, on the border between Catamarca and Tucumán provinces. It is the highest point of a significant eastern spur of the main range of the Andes, east of the Puna de Atacama region. It lies about 200 kilometres east of Ojos del Salado, the highest point in the Puna de Atacama.

While not of great height compared to the 6000 metre-plus peaks of the main chain of the Andes to the west, Bolsón is notable for its high topographic prominence (it ranks 69th in the world), resulting from its separation from the main chain by a relatively low saddle.

The name comes from the Spanish word "bolsa" or bag. The -on suffix denotes large. However in most of Latin America the term is used geographically to denote a hollow or enclosed valley, e.g. El Bolsón, Río Negro in Argentina. The geographical term Bolson has even spread to US English.

== See also ==
- List of Ultras of South America
