= Mishahuanga =

Mountain in Peru

- Location within Peru

Highest point
- Elevation: 4,109 m (13,481 ft)
- Prominence: 1,817 m (5,961 ft)
- Isolation: 90.37 km (56.15 mi)
- Listing: Ultra
- Coordinates: 6°22′26″S 79°14′14″W

Geography
- Country: Peru
- Province: Cajamarca
- Parent range: Northern Cordillera Occidental

Mishuahuanga (Cerro Mishahuanga) is a mountain located in Cajamarca, Peru. It is an ultra-prominent peak. It has an elevation of 4,109 m (13,481 ft).

== Description ==
Mishahunga is poorly known because of the humid forests and grasslands causing many species in the area to isolate. The Huancabamba River separates Cerro Mishahuanga from humid habitats to the northeast, while the Chotano and Chancay rivers separate Cerro Mishahuanga from the east and south. The eastern slopes contain a humid forest between 2400 - 3000 metres above sea level, and elfin forest, paramo, and puna grassland above 3000 metres.

== See also ==
List of ultras of South America
