= Serra Imeri =

Mountain in Brazil and Venezuela

- Location within Brazil

Highest point
- Elevation: 2,994 m (9,823 ft)
- Prominence: 1,951 m (6,401 ft)
- Listing: Ultra
- Coordinates: 00°29′27″N 65°20′00″W

Geography
- Location: Brazil – Venezuela border

Serra Imeri is a mountain in South America, just north of the equator. It has an elevation of 2,994 metres (9,823 ft) and sits on the international border between Brazil and Venezuela.

== See also ==
- List of Ultras of South America
