= Tres Hermanos =

Mexican shoe retailer

Tres Hermanos is one of the largest chains of shoe stores in Mexico. It was owned by Arnulfo Padilla Padilla (b. 17 February 1933, d. 6 December 2019), who also invested in hotels, and died in 2019. It is a family business of three brothers of the Padilla family based in León, Guanajuato, the center of the Mexican shoe industry. The Padillas originate in the Altos de Jalisco, from the city of San Juan de los Lagos, Jalisco. In 1951, Juan Manuel, Rodolfo and Arnulfo decided to manufacture their own line of shoes and later to sell them and after that, sell shoes that they purchased from other manufacturers. The chain consists of about 450 shoe stores across the country. The company describes its marketing concept as offering fashion, quality and price for a broad market covering men, women and children.

Along with Grupo Castores, Flecha Amarilla bus lines and Banco del Bajio it is one of the most notable companies based in León, Mexico's seventh-largest metropolitan area.

3 Hermanos sponsors the Lobos BUAP soccer/football team.

== Arnulfo Padilla ==
=== Awards ===
Arnulfo Padilla received the Sapica award in September 2017. Promoter of tourism and recognized for his career in the shoe industry, in 2017 Gabino Fernández presented him the Canaco (Confederation of National Chambers of Commerce) and Servytur Award for Tourism, for hotel investments and overall development of the tourism industry. This was done within the framework of the 100th Anniversary celebrations of CANACO and the tourist development board of León.
