= Cerro Tristeza =

Mountain in Venezuela

- Location within Venezuela

Highest point
- Elevation: 2,596 m (8,517 ft)
- Prominence: 2,456 m (8,058 ft)
- Listing: Ultra
- Coordinates: 10°05′03″N 63°57′30″W

Geography
- Location: Sucre, Venezuela

Cerro Tristeza (lit. 'Sadness Hill', in the Spanish language) is a mountain in South America. It has an elevation of 2,596 metres (8,517 ft) above sea level. Cerro Tristeza lies within the coastal state of Sucre, Venezuela, near the border with the Venezuelan state of Anzoátegui.

== See also ==
- List of ultras of South America
