= Cerro Aguja Sur =

Mountain in Argentina

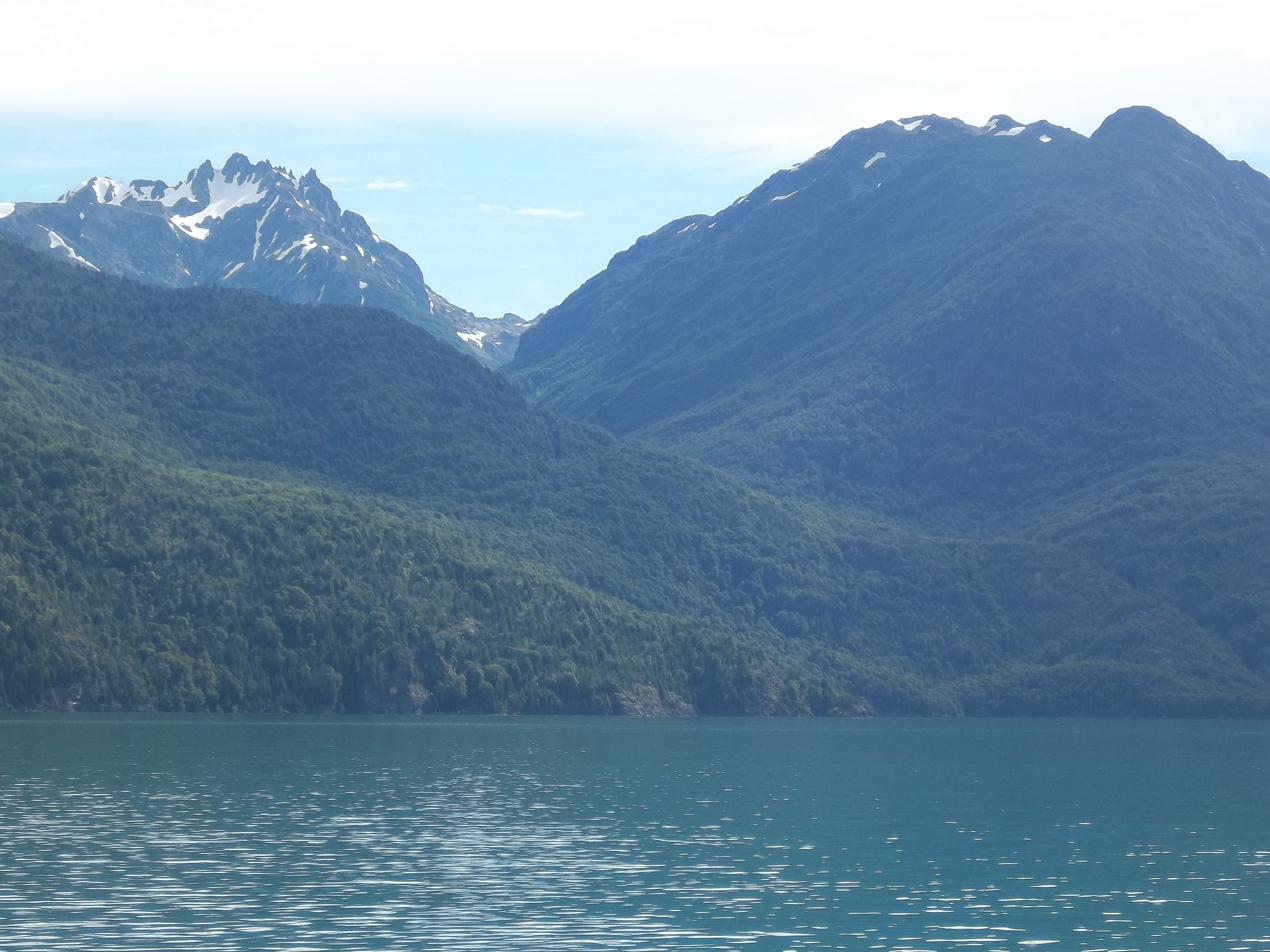
- The mountain to the left, from Puelo Lake

Highest point
- Elevation: 2,298 m (7,539 ft)
- Coordinates: 42°9′34″S 71°49′44″W

Geography
- Location within Argentina
- Location: Argentina and Chile
- Parent range: Andes

Cerro Aguja Sur is a mountain in the Andes mountain range, located in the Chubut Province of Argentina and Los Lagos Region of Chile. It is 2298 meters high, forming one of the major elevations of the area, and thus also one of the endpoints of the province of Chubut.
