= Cerro Cañapa =

Mountain in Bolivia

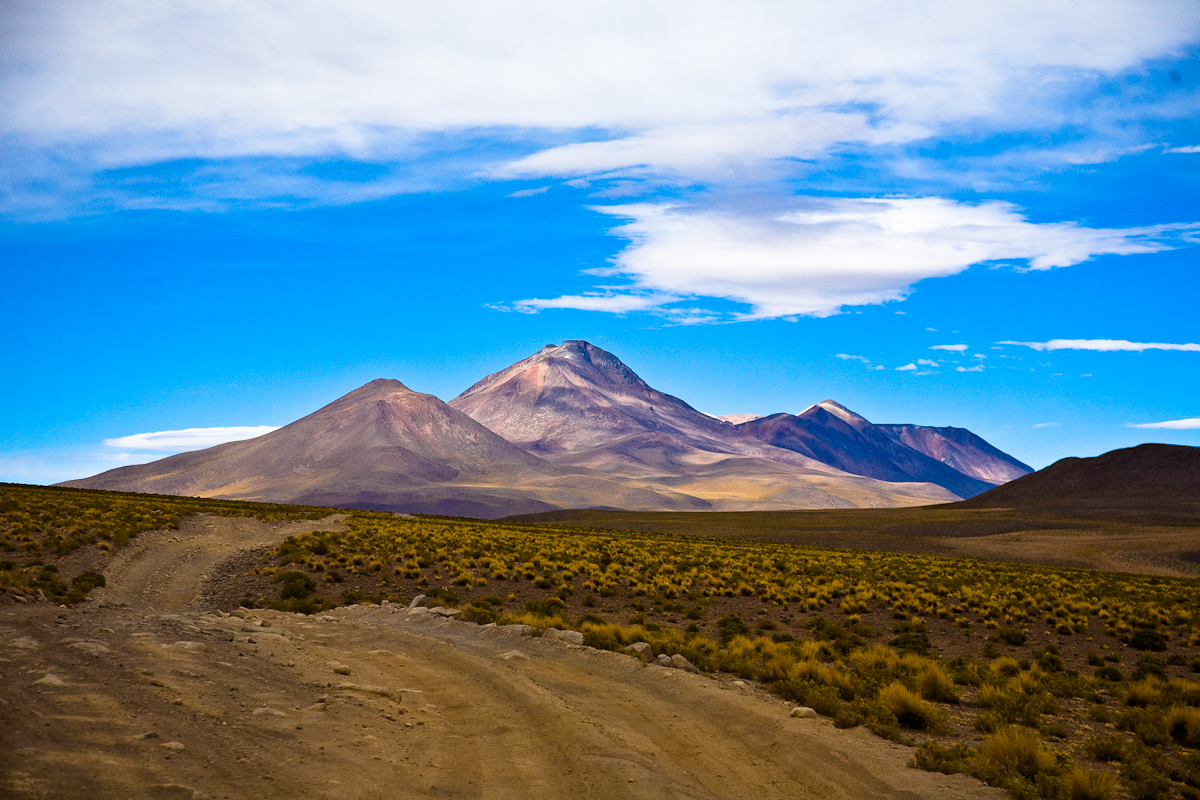
- Cañapa North Face

Highest point
- Elevation: 5,882 m (19,298 ft)
- Prominence: 1,595 m (5,233 ft)
- Listing: Ultra
- Coordinates: 21°27′S 68°04′W

Geography
- Location within Bolivia
- Location: Potosí Department, Bolivia

Cerro Cañapa is an elongated mountain in Bolivia, with a height of 5882 m, close to the border with Chile. Note that the international border in this area is a straight line that runs from Cerro Araral to Ollagüe, leaving Cerro Cañapa completely in Bolivian territory.

The mountain forms an enormous backdrop to the colorful lakes Cañapa and Hedionda.

The mountain is constructed from andesite and dacite. Volcanism of Canapa was influenced by local northwest-striking normal fault zones which also affected the Luxsar and Toconce volcanoes. The range is partially underpinned by modern ignimbrites. Canapa has deposits left by solfataras. The volcanic range is 50–100 kilometres (31–62 mi) long and may have originated from deep-seated basement lineaments. Volcanism is Pliocene-Pleistocene in age.

== See also ==
- List of Ultras of South America
