= Sierra de Sangra =

Mountain in Argentina

Coordinates: 48°22′S 72°21′W

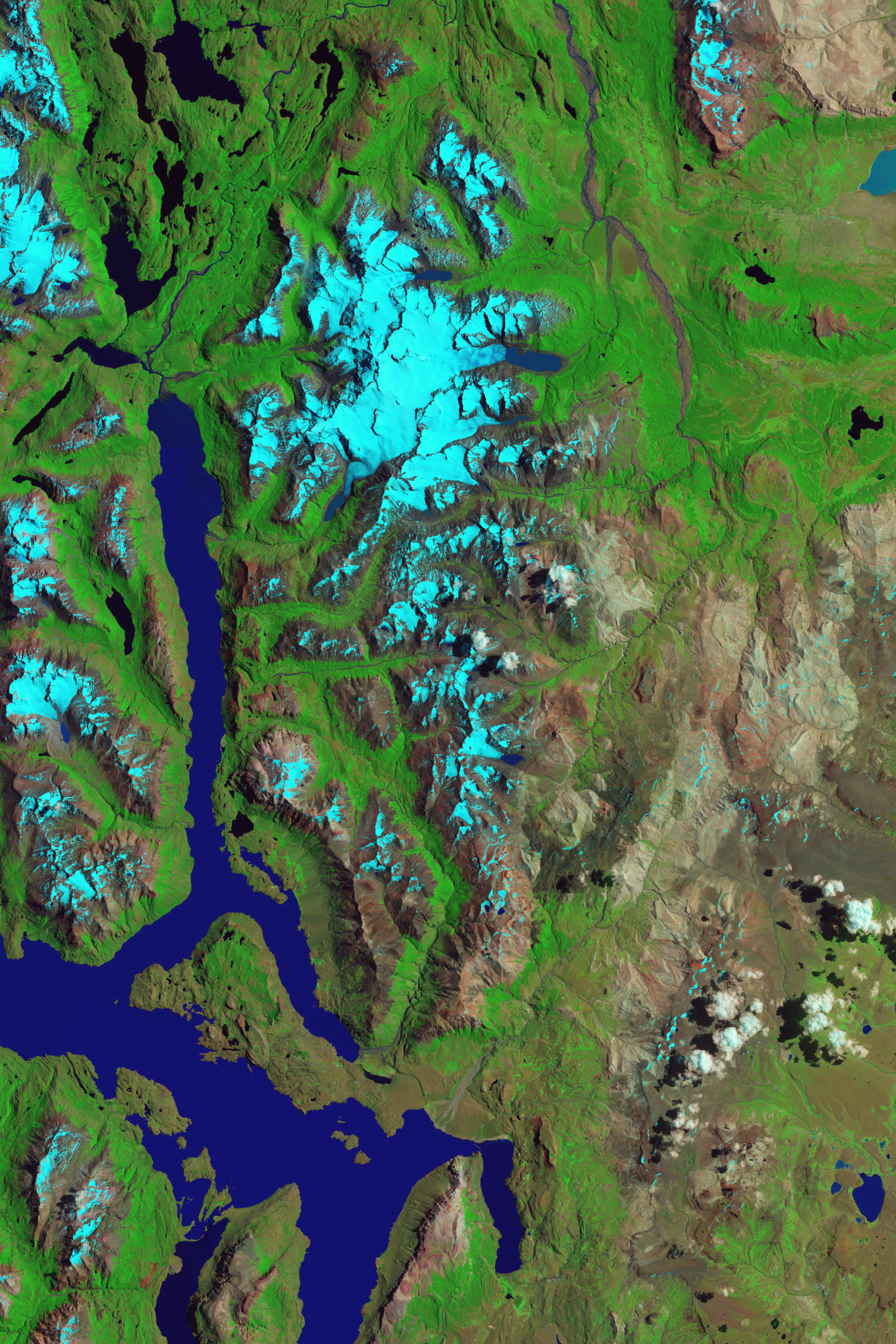

Highest point
- Elevation: 2,200 m (7,200 ft)
- Listing: Ultra

Geography
- Location: Chile/Argentina
- Parent range: Andes

Geology
- Mountain type: Stratovolcano

Sierra de Sangra is an extinct ice-clad stratovolcano with its summit located 10 km east of Villa O'Higgins. The volcanic masiff is heavily eroded and constitutes part of the Argentine-Chilean border in Patagonia.
