= Majadita =

Mountain in Argentina

- Cumbre de la Majadita from the west.

Highest point
- Elevation: 6,280 m (20,600 ft)
- Prominence: 2,113 m (6,932 ft)
- Listing: Ultra
- Coordinates: 30°25′12″S 69°46′51″W

Geography
- Location within Argentina
- Location: Argentina
- Parent range: Andes

Climbing
- First ascent: John Biggar on December 4, 1996
- Easiest route: North slopes

Cumbre de la Majadita is a mountain peak in the province of San Juan in Argentina near the town of Rodeo. It was one of the last 6000m+ peaks in the Andes to be climbed, the first recorded ascent being in December 1996.

The peak has some large but easy angled glaciers on its flanks.

== See also ==
- List of mountains in Argentina
- List of Ultras of South America
- List of mountains in the Andes
