= Cerro =

Cerro is Spanish for "hill" or "mountain".

== People ==
- Francisco Cerro (born 1988), Argentine footballer
- Francisco Cerro Chaves (born 1957), Spanish prelate, theologian, and philosopher of the Catholic Church
- Ian Cerro (born 1996), American footballer
- Isma Cerro (born 1995), Spanish footballer
- Mariana Cerro (born 2000), Spanish footballer
- Rafael Cerro (weightlifter) (born 1997), Colombian weightlifter
- Rafael Cerro (born 1993), Spanish bullfighter
- Samuele Cerro (born 1995), Italian triple jumper
- Luis del Cerro (1924–2019), Spanish sport shooter, Olympian
- María Del Cerro (born 1985), Argentine model, actress, television presenter and fashion designer
- Saúl del Cerro (born 2004), Spanish footballer
- Luis Miguel Sánchez Cerro (1889–1933), Peruvian army officer and President of Peru

== Toponyms ==
Argentina

- Cerro Ameghino, Mendoza Province
- Cerro Archibarca, Salta Province
- Cerro Arco, Mendoza Province
- Cerro Azul, Misiones
- Cerro Bandera Formation, Neuquén Province
- Cerro Barcino Formation, Chubut Province
- Cerro Bayo, Neuquén Province
- Cerro Bayo Complex, Catamarca Province (shared with Chile)
- Cerro Beltrán, volcano in Catamarca Province
- Cerro Bitiche, volcanic field in Jujuy Province
- Cerro Blanco, volcano in Catamarca Province
- Cerro Bonete, La Rioja Province
- Cerro Carnerero Formation, Chubut Province
- Cerro Castillo Formation
- Cerro Castor, ski resort, Tierra del Fuego Province
- Cerro Catedral, ski resort and mountain, Río Negro Province
  - Cerro Catedral Heliport, nearby
- Cerro Centinela, municipality, Chubut Province
- Cerro Champaquí, Córdoba Province
- Cerro Ciénaga Grande, Salta Province
- Cerro Colorados, Catamarca Province (shared with Chile)
- Cerro Cóndor, municipality, Chubut Province
- Cerro Corá, village in Misiones Province
- Cerro de la Gloria, Mendoza Province
- Cerro del Bolsón, Tucumán Province
- Cerro del Nacimiento, volcano, Catamarca Province
- Cerro de los Chenques, monogenetic volcano in Chubut Province
- Cerro de los Siete Colores, Jujuy Province
- Cerro de Oro, municipality in San Luis Province
- Cerro Dragón oil field, Chubut Province
- Cerro El Cóndor, Catamarca Province
- Cerro El Muerto, Copiapó Province (shared with Chile)
- Cerro El Plata, Mendoza Province
- Cerro El Toro, San Juan Province (shared with Chile)
- Cerro Escorial, Salta Province (shared with Chile)
- Cerro Fortaleza Formation, Santa Cruz Province
- Cerro Laguna Blanca, Catamarca Province
- Cerro Las Tórtolas, San Juan Province (shared with Chile)
- Cerro Morado, volcanic field in Jujuy Province
- Cerro Murallón, Santa Cruz Province (shared with Chile)
- Cerro Negro Formation, Buenos Aires Province
- Cerro Negro mine, gold mine, Santa Cruz Province
- Cerro Otto, Río Negro Province
- Cerro Pajonal, Catamarca Province
- Cerro Panizos, shield-shaped volcano in Jujuy Province (shared with Bolivia)
- Cerro Pantoja, extinct volcano (lava plug) in Neuquén Province (shared with Chile)
- Cerro Piergiorgio, Santa Cruz Province (shared with Chile)
- Cerro Plataforma Formation, Chubut Province
- Cerro Policía, municipality, Río Negro Province
- Cerro Quemado, Catamarca Province
- Cerro Ramada, San Juan Province
- Cerro Ratones, Salta and Catamarca Provinces
- Cerro Redondo, lava dome in Jujuy Province
- Cerro San Javier, Tucumán Province
- Cerros Colorados Complex, hydroelectric project in Neuquén Province
- Cerros Negros de Jama, monogenetic volcanic group in Jujuy Province
- Cerro Solo, Catamarca Province (shared with Chile)
- Cerro Tinte, Jujuy Province (shared with Bolivia)
- Cerro Torre, Santa Cruz Province (shared with Chile)
- Cerro Torta, lava dome, Catamarca Province
- Cerro Tres Picos, Buenos Aires Province
- Cerro Tuzgle, Jujuy Province
- Cerro Vanguardia Mine, gold and silver mine in Santa Cruz Province
- Cerro Volcánico, cinder cone, Río Negro Province

Belize

- Cerros, archaeological site in Corozal District.

Bolivia

- Cerro Araral, Potosí Department (shared with Chile)
- Cerro Ascotan, Potosí Department (shared with Chile)
- Cerro Bonete, Potosí Department
- Cerro Candelaria, Potosí Department
- Cerro Capurata, Oruro Department (shared with Chile)
- Cerro Caquella, Potosí Department
- Cerro Cañapa, Potosí Department
- Cerro Chascon-Runtu Jarita complex, Sud Lipez Region
- Cerro Columa, crater, Oruro Department
- Cerro Deslinde, volcano, Potosí Department (shared with Chile)
- Cerro Guacha, caldera, Potosí Department
- Cerro Lípez, Potosí Department
- Cerro Napa, Potosí Department (shared with Chile)
- Cerro Rico, the "Rich Mountain" containing silver ore near Potosi
- Cerro Panizos, shield-shaped volcano in Potosí Department (shared with Argentina)
- Cerro Rico, Potosí Department
- Cerro Saxani, Oruro Department
- Cerro Tinte, Potosí Department (shared with Argentina)

Brazil

- Cerro Azul, a municipality in Paraná
- Cerro Branco, a municipality in Rio Grande do Sul
- Cerro Corá, a municipality in Rio Grande do Norte
- Cerro do Inhacurutum, Rio Grande do Sul
- Cerro do Jarau crater, probable impact crater, Rio Grande do Sul
- Cerro Grande, a municipality in Rio Grande do Sul
- Cerro Grande do Sul, a municipality in Rio Grande do Sul
- Cerro Largo, a municipality in Rio Grande do Sul
- Cerro Negro, a municipality in Santa Catarina

Chile

- Cerro Amaculla, Tarapacá Region
- Cerro Araral, Antofagasta Region (shared with Bolivia)
- Cerro Arenales, Aysén del General Carlos Ibáñez del Campo Region
- Cerro Arenas, Santiago Metropolitan Region
- Cerro Armazones, Antofagasta Region
- Cerro Ascotan, Antofagasta Region (shared with Bolivia)
- Cerro Azul, volcano in the Maule Region
- Cerro Ballena, a fossiliferous locality in the Atacama Region
- Cerro Bandera, in Magallanes Region
- Cerro Bayo Complex, Atacama Region (shared with Argentina)
- Cerro Benítez, Magallanes Region
- Cerro Blanco, Santiago
  - Cerro Blanco metro station
- Cerro Blanco mine, titanium mine, Atacama Region
- Cerro Bravo Alto, Atacama Region
- Cerro Capurata, Arica y Parinacota Region (shared with Bolivia)
- Cerro Cariquima, Tarapacá Region
- Cerro Casale mine, gold mine, Atacama Region
- Cerro Castillo, Aysén del General Carlos Ibáñez del Campo Region
  - Cerro Castillo National Park
- Cerro Castillo, Chile, hamlet, Magallanes Region
  - Cerro Castillo Airport, nearby
- Cerro Castillo Dynevor, Magallanes Region
- Cerro Cebollar, Antofagasta Region
- Cerro Chaihuín, Los Ríos Region
- Cerro Chanka, Antofagasta Region
- Cerro Chao, Antofagasta Region
- Cerro Chela, Antofagasta Region
- Cerro Chilinchilín, Tarapacá Region
- Cerro Colorados, Atacama Region (shared with Argentina)
- Cerro Colorado, volcano in the Antofagasta Region
- Cerro Colorado Formation, Aysén del General Carlos Ibáñez del Campo Region
- Cerro Coposa, Tarapacá Region
- Cerro Cosapilla, Arica y Parinacota Region
- Cerro de La Isla, Antofagasta Region
- Cerro del Azufre, stratovolcano, Antofagasta Region
- Cerro de las Cuevas, volcano, Antofagasta Region
- Cerro del León, stratovolcano, Antofagasta Region
- Cerro de Los Inocentes, in the Juan Fernández Islands, Valparaíso Region
- Cerro Deslinde, volcano, Antofagasta Region (shared with Bolivia)
- Cerro Dominador Solar Thermal Plant, Antofagasta Region
- Cerro Doña Ana, Coquimbo Region
- Cerro Doña Inés, Atacama Region
- Cerro El Morado, Santiago Metropolitan Region
- Cerro El Muerto, Atacama Region (shared with Argentina)
- Cerro El Plomo, Santiago Metropolitan Region
- Cerro El Roble, Santiago Metropolitan Region
- Cerro El Toro, Atacama Region (shared with Argentina)
- Cerro Escorial, Antofagasta Region (shared with Argentina)
- Cerro Incahuasi, Antofagasta Region
- Cerro La Campana, Valparaíso Region
- Cerro Las Tórtolas, Coquimbo Region (shared with Argentina)
- Cerro Lirima, Tarapacá Region
- Cerro Macá, Aysén del General Carlos Ibáñez del Campo Region
- Cerro Maltusado, Los Ríos Region
- Cerro Miscanti, Antofagasta Region
- Cerro Murallón, Magallanes Region (shared with Argentina)
- Cerro Murphy Observatory, Antofagasta Region
- Cerro Napa, Tarapacá Region (shared with Bolivia)
- Cerro Navia, municipality, Santiago Metropolitan Region
- Cerro Ñielol Natural Monument, Araucanía Region
- Cerro Oncol, Los Ríos Region
- Cerro Overo, volcanic crater, Antofagasta Region
- Cerro Pachón, Coquimbo Region
- Cerro Pajonales, Antofagasta Region
- Cerro Pantoja, extinct volcano (lava plug) in Los Lagos Region (shared with Argentina)
- Cerro Paranal, Antofagasta Region
  - Cerro Paranal Airport
- Cerro Pared Norte, Aysén del General Carlos Ibáñez del Campo Region
- Cerro Pasto Salado, Coquimbo Region
- Cerro Piergiorgio, Magallanes Region (shared with Argentina)
- Cerro Polapi, Antofagasta Region
- Cerro Porquesa, Tarapacá Region
- Cerro Provincia, Santiago Metropolitan Region
- Cerro Renca, Santiago Metropolitan Region
- Cerros Bravos-Barros Negros, volcanic complex, Atacama Region
- Cerros de Incahuasi, mountain with several summits, Antofagasta Region
- Cerros de Quimán, mountain group, Los Ríos Region
- Cerro Solo, Antofagasta Region (shared with Argentina)
- Cerro Sombrero, village, Magallanes Region
- Cerro Steffen, Aysén del General Carlos Ibáñez del Campo Region
- Cerro Tapado, Valparaíso Region
- Cerro Tenerife, Magallanes Region
- Cerro Toco, Antofagasta Region
- Cerro Tololo Inter-American Observatory, astronomical observatory, Coquimbo Region
- Cerro Toro, Cretaceous landform, Magallanes Region
- Cerro Torre, Magallanes Region (shared with Argentina)
- Cerro Tujle, Antofagasta Region
- Cerro Vicuña Mackenna, Antofagasta Region
- Cerro Vicuñas, Atacama Region

Colombia

- Cerro Bravo, Tolima Department
- Cerro Machín, Tolima Department
- Cerro Matoso mine, Córdoba Department
- Cerro Negro de Mayasquer, active volcano in Nariño Department (shared with Ecuador)
- Cerro Pintado, Cesar Department (shared with Venezuela)
- Cerro San Antonio, town in Magdalena Department
- Cerros de Mavecure, three hills, Guainía Department
- Cerro Tusa, Antioquia Department

Costa Rica

- Cerro Cedral, San José Province
- Cerro de la Muerte, highest point on Pan-American Highway, Cartago Province
- Cerro de la Muerte Biological Station, San José Province
- Cerro Kamuk, Limón Province
- Cerro Pico Alto, San José Province
- Cerro Pico Blanco, Limón Province
- Cerro Rabo de Mico, San José Province
- Cerro San Miguel, San José Province
- Cerros de Escazú, mountain range, San José Province
- Cerro Tilarán, Guanacaste Province

Cuba

- Cerro, Havana, a district (municipio)

Dominican Republic

- Cerro de Navas, Puerto Plata province
- Cerros de Arroyo Hondo, neighbourhood, Distrito Nacional
- Cerros de Sal Formation, Barahona and Independencia provinces

Ecuador

- Cerro Azul, volcano in the Galápagos Islands
- Cerro Blanco Forest, Guayas Province
- Cerro de Arcos, rock formation in El Oro and Loja Provinces
- Cerro Negro de Mayasquer, active volcano in Carchi Province (shared with Colombia)
- Cerro Pajas, inactive volcano in the Galápagos Islands

El Salvador

- Cerro Cinotepeque
- Cerro El Pital (shared with Honduras)

Guatemala

- Cerro Amay, in Quiché Department
- Cerro de Coxóm, in Totonicapán Department
- Cerro El Baúl, lava dome in Quetzaltenango Department
- Cerro El Reformador, in Yoro Department
- Cerro Miramundo, in Zacapa Department
- Cerro Quiac, archaeological site in Quetzaltenango Department
- Cerro Santiago, in Jutiapa Department

Honduras

- Cerro Azul de Copán, a national park in Copán department
- Cerro Congolón, Lempira Department
- Cerro El Pital (shared with El Salvador)
- Cerro Las Minas, Honduras's highest mountain, Lempira Department
- Cerro Palenque, archaeological site in Cortés Department
- Cerro Tenán, Copán department

Italy

- Cerro (Bottanuco), a subdivision of Bottanuco in the province of Bergamo
- Cerro al Lambro, in the province of Milano
- Cerro al Volturno, in the province of Isernia
- Cerro Maggiore, in the province of Milano
- Cerro Tanaro, in the province of Asti
- Cerro Veronese, in the province of Verona

Mexico

- Cerro Azul, Veracruz
- Cerro Bola, Baja California
- Cerro Colorado, Tijuana, Baja California
  - Cerro Colorado, borough of Tijuana, Baja California
- Cerro de Chipinque, Nuevo León
- Cerro de Garnica National Park, Michoacán
- Cerro de la Campana, Sonora
- Cerro de la Estrella, archaeological site in Mexico City
  - Cerro de la Estrella metro station
  - Cerro de la Estrella National Park
- Cerro de la Loma Larga, Nuevo León
- Cerro de la Silla, Nuevo León
- Cerro de la Viga, Nuevo León
- Cerro de las Campanas, hill and national park, Querétaro
- Cerro de las Mesas, archaeological site, Veracruz
- Cerro de las Minas, archaeological site, Oaxaca
- Cerro de las Mitras, Nuevo León
- Cerro del Chiquihuite, México
- Cerro del Cubilete, Guanajuato
- Cerro del Judío, Mexico City
- Cerro del Obispado, Nuevo León
- Cerro del Pueblo Formation, Coahuila
- Cerro del Quinceo, inactive volcano, Michoacán
- Cerro del Topo Chico, protected area, Nuevo León
- Cerro de Macuiltépetl, Veracruz
- Cerro de Oro Dam, Oaxaca
- Cerro de Oro Formation, Sonora
- Cerro de San Pedro, village in San Luis Potosí
- Cerro El Huehuentón, Jalisco
- Cerro El Veladero, Guerrero
- Cerro Grande, mountain range in Colima and Jalisco
- Cerro La Cruz del Marqués, México
- Cerro Mesa Ahumada, México
- Cerro Mohinora, Chihuahua
- Cerro Moneda, Oaxaca
- Cerro Potosí, highest mountain in the Sierra Madre Oriental, Nuevo León
- Cerro Prieto, Baja California
- Cerro Prieto, small rural town, Hidalgo
- Cerro Prieto Fault, Baja California
- Cerro Prieto Geothermal Power Station, Baja California
- Cerro Teotepec, Guerrero
- Cerro Tláloc, mountain and archaeological site, México

Nicaragua

- Cerro Arenal, natural reserve in Matagalpa department
- Cerro Banacruz, natural reserve in the North Caribbean Coast Autonomous Region
- Cerro Cola Blanca, natural reserve in the North Caribbean Coast Autonomous Region
- Cerro Cumaica–Cerro Alegre, natural reserve in Boaco department
- Cerro Guabule, natural reserve in Matagalpa department
- Cerro Kilambé, natural reserve in Jinotega department
- Cerro Mombachito–La Vieja, natural reserve in Boaco department
- Cerro Musún, natural reserve in Matagalpa department
- Cerro Negro, active volcano in León Department
- Cerro Pancasan, natural reserve in Matagalpa department
- Cerro Silva, natural reserve in South Caribbean Coast Autonomous Region
- Cerro Tisey–Estanzuela, natural reserve in Estelí department
- Cerro Wawashang, natural reserve in South Caribbean Coast Autonomous Region

Panama

- Cerro Azul, Panama
- Cerro Banco, Ngäbe-Buglé Comarca
- Cerro Cama, Panamá province
- Cerro Caña, Ngäbe-Buglé Comarca
- Cerro de Casa, corregimiento in Veraguas Province
- Cerro de Patena, corregimiento in Ngäbe-Buglé Comarca
- Cerro de Plata, corregimiento in Veraguas Province
- Cerro Echandi, Bocas del Toro province
- Cerro Fábrega, Bocas del Toro province
- Cerro Hoya National Park, Veraguas Province
- Cerro Iglesias, corregimiento in Ngäbe-Buglé Comarca
- Cerro Largo, corregimiento in Herrera province
- Cerro Pelado, Ngäbe-Buglé Comarca
- Cerro Picacho, Chiriquí Province
- Cerro Puerco, corregimiento in Ngäbe-Buglé Comarca
- Cerro Punta, city in Chiriquí Province
- Cerro Silvestre, corregimiento in Panamá Oeste Province
- Cerro Tacarcuna, Darién Province
- Cerro Viejo, corregimiento in Chiriquí Province
- Cerro Viento metro station, Panama City

Paraguay

- Cerro Corá, hill in Amambay Department
- Cerro Corá National Park, Amambay Department
- Cerro Corá, city in Amambay Department
- Cerro Tres Kandú, Paraguay's highest mountain, Guairá Department

Peru

- Cerro Azul, Peru
- Cerro Barroso, Tacna Region
- Cerro Baúl, archaeological site in Moquegua Region
- Cerro Colorado District, Arequipa Region
- Cerro de la Sal, Junín Region
- Cerro de Pasco, city, Pasco Region
- Cerro Nicholson, scoria cone in Arequipa Region
- Cerro Pátapo ruins, Lambayeque Region
- Cerros de Amotape National Park, Piura and Tumbes Regions
- Cerro Sechín, archaeological site in Ancash Region
- Cerro Verde mine, copper mine in Arequipa Region

Puerto Rico

- Cerro del Diablo, Ponce
- Cerro del Vigía, Ponce
- Cerro de Punta, Puerto Rico's highest peak, Jayuya
- Cerro Doña Juana, Orocovis
- Cerro El Bolo, Villalba
- Cerro Gordo, Aguada, a barrio
- Cerro Gordo, Añasco, a barrio
- Cerro Gordo, Bayamón, a barrio
- Cerro Gordo, Moca, a barrio
- Cerro Gordo, San Lorenzo, a barrio
- Cerro Gregorio, San Lorenzo
- Cerro La Santa, Caguas, Cayey and San Lorenzo
- Cerro Las Piñas, Caguas and Cayey
- Cerro Las Tetas, Salinas
- Cerro Maravilla, Ponce
- Cerro Morales, Utuado
- Cerro Planada, Cayey
- Cerro Rosa, Ciales and Jayuya
- Cerrote, Las Marías, a barrio

Spain

- Cerro Colorado mining deposit, Huelva
- Cerro de Charo, Huesca
- Cerro de Gorría, Ávila
- Cerro de las Cabezas, archaeological site, Ciudad Real
- Cerro del Bu, archaeological site, Toledo
- Cerro de los Ángeles, geographic centre of the Iberian Peninsula, Madrid
- Cerro de los Batallones, Madrid
- Cerro de los Santos, archaeological site, Albacete
- Cerro del Lucero, Granada
- Cerro del Villar, archaeological site, Málaga

United States

- Cerro, New Mexico
- Cerro Alto, California
- Cerro Alto Mountain, Texas
- Cerro Cabrillo, Morro Bay State Park, California
- Cerro Ciento, Idaho
- Cerro Colorado, ghost town in Arizona
- Cerro Colorado Mountains, low mountain range in Arizona
- Cerro Conejo Formation, New Mexico
- Cerro de la Calavera, San Diego County, California
- Cerro del Yuta Wilderness, New Mexico
- Cerrogordo, Florida
- Cerro Gordo, Illinois
- Cerro Gordo, Minnesota
- Cerro Gordo Township, Minnesota
- Cerro Gordo, North Carolina
- Cerro Gordo, Tennessee
- Cerro Gordo County, Iowa
- Cerro Gordo, California, east of the Owens Valley
  - Cerro Gordo Mines, Inyo County, California
- Cerro Gordo Township, Piatt County, Illinois
- Cerro Grande, peak in New Mexico
- Cerro Noroeste, Kern County, California
- Cerro Pedernal, mesa, in New Mexico
- Cerro Pelon Ranch, New Mexico
- Cerro Romualdo, San Luis Obispo County, California
- Cerro San Luis Obispo, San Luis Obispo County, California
- Cerro Summit, mountain pass, in Colorado

Uruguay

- Cerro Catedral, Uruguay's highest point
- Cerro Chato, town, divided among three departments: Durazno, Florida and Treinta y Tres
- Cerro de las Ánimas, Maldonado Department
- Cerro de las Cuentas, village, Cerro Largo Department
- Cerro Ejido, suburb of Artigas
- Cerro Largo Department
- Cerro Pan de Azúcar, Maldonado Department
- Cerro Pelado, suburb of Maldonado
- Cerro San Antonio, Maldonado Department
- Fortaleza del Cerro, in Montevideo
- Villa del Cerro, in Montevideo

Venezuela

- Cerro Aracamuni, in Amazonas state
- Cerro Autana, in Amazonas state
- Cerro Avispa, in Amazonas state
- Cerro Bolívar, in Bolívar state
- Cerro de la Neblina, sandstone massif, in Amazonas state (shared with Brazil, although in Portuguese, the name does not begin with "Cerro")
- Cerro Duida, in Amazonas state
- Cerro El Copey National Park, in Nueva Esparta state
- Cerro El Sol, in Bolívar state
- Cerro El Toro, Upata, in Bolívar state
- Cerro El Volcán, Metropolitan Region of Caracas
- Cerro Huachamacari, mesa, in Amazonas state
- Cerro Impacto, mineral deposit, in Amazonas state
- Cerro Jaua, mesa, in Bolívar state
- Cerro La Luna, mesa, in Bolívar state
- Cerro Marahuaca, mesa, in Amazonas state
- Cerro María Lionza Natural Monument, in Yaracuy state
- Cerro Petaca, forested ridge in Amazonas state
- Cerro Pintado, Zulia state (shared with Colombia)
- Cerro Platillón, natural monument in Guárico state
- Cerro Santa Ana, natural monument in Falcón state
- Cerro Saroche National Park, in Lara state
- Cerro Tenerife, in Mérida state
- Cerro Tristeza, in Anzoátegui state

== Football clubs ==
- C.A. Cerro, a football club from Montevideo, Uruguay
- Club Cerro Corá, a football club from Asunción, Paraguay
- Cerro Largo F.C., a football club from Melo, Uruguay
- Cerro Porteño, a football club from Asunción, Paraguay
- Club Cerro Porteño, a football club from Presidente Franco, Paraguay

== See also ==
- Cero (disambiguation)
- Serro, a municipality in Minas Gerais, Brazil
- Cerrito (disambiguation)
