= Cerro Picacho =

Cerro Picacho may refer to:

- Cerro Picacho (Chiriquí)
- Cerro Picacho (Panamá Oeste)
