= Loma de León Natural Monument =

Venezuelan national monument

Loma de León Natural Monument Monumento Natural Loma de León
- IUCN category III (natural monument or feature)
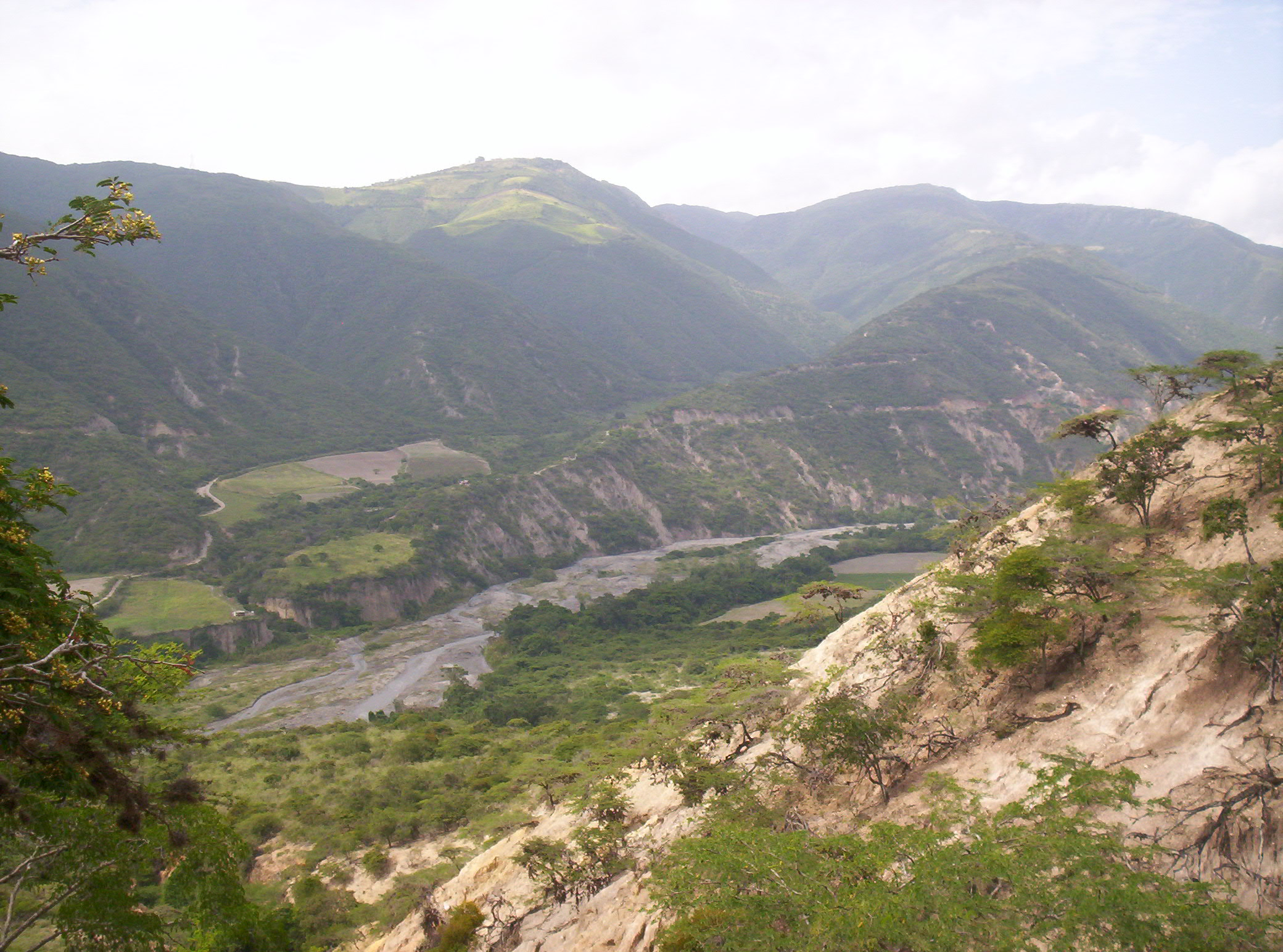

- Location within Venezuela
- Location: Venezuela
- Coordinates: 10°0′N 69°23′W
- Area: 72.75 km^{2} (28.09 sq mi)
- Established: February 4, 1987

The Loma de León Natural Monument (Spanish: Monumento Natural Loma de León) Also Loma de León Is a natural protected area located in the municipality of Iribarren, belonging to the state of Lara, Venezuela. It received the status of national monument on February 2, 1987.

== Description ==
The landscape is semi-arid, it is possible to emphasize the watchtower on the valley of the river Turbio and the locality of Barquisimeto, located at a height of 1,300 m in an area known as Loma de León, formed predominantly by quartzite rocks.

Representatives of the animal kingdom include the báquiro, matacan deer, fox, wildcat, rabbit, partridge, in addition to some species in danger of extinction. Protecting this environment ensures the preservation of the scenarios of natural monuments and the water courses that flow into the banks of the river Turbio.

== See also ==
- List of national parks of Venezuela
- Cerro Platillón Natural Monument
