= Plata =

Plata may refer to:

- Joao Plata (born 1992), an Ecuadorian football player
- Juan Carlos Plata (born 1971), a Guatemalan retired football player
- Plata, Texas, an unincorporated community in Presidio County, Texas, United States
- La Plata, the capital city of the Province of Buenos Aires, Argentina
- Plata, Aibonito, Puerto Rico, a barrio
- Plata, Lajas, Puerto Rico, a barrio
- Plata, Moca, Puerto Rico, a barrio
- a type of tequila
- Cerro El Plata, a mountain in Argentina called Plata
