= Cerro Tenerife =

Cerro Tenerife may refer to:

- Cerro Tenerife (Chile), a mountain
- Cerro Tenerife (Venezuela), a hill
