= Cero =

Cero or CERO may refer to:

- Cero (band), a Japanese pop band from Tokyo (2004–present)
- Cero (fish), a large food and game fish of the scombroid family, found mainly in the West Indies
- Computer Entertainment Rating Organization, the organization that rates video games and computer software in Japan
- USS Cero, more than one United States Navy ship
- Cero (TV channel) or #0, Spanish TV channel
- Cero, an attack used by Hollows in the Bleach manga and television series

== See also ==
- Cerro (disambiguation)
- Serro, a municipality in Minas Gerais, Brazil
