= Inka Wasi =

Inka Wasi or Inkawasi (Quechua Inka Inca, wasi house, "Inca house", Hispanicized spellings Inca Huasi, Incahuasi, Incaguasi) may refer to:

- Natural features
  - Incahuasi, a volcano on the border between Argentina and Chile
  - Cerro Incahuasi, a mountain in Chile
  - Cerros de Incahuasi, a mountain in the Antofagasta Region, Chile
  - Inka Wasi (Apurímac), a mountain in the Apurímac Region, Peru
  - Inka Wasi, Ayacucho, an archaeological site in Ayacucho Region, Peru
  - Inka Wasi (Bolivia), a mountain in the Chuquisaca Department, Bolivia
  - Inka Wasi, Huancavelica, an archaeological site in Huancavelica Region, Peru
  - Inka Wasi, Lima, an archaeological site in Lima Region, Peru
  - Inka Wasi (Lucanas), a mountain in the Lucanas Province, Ayacucho Region, Peru
  - Inka Wasi River, a river in Bolivia
  - Isla Incahuasi, a rock in Salar de Uyuni, Bolivia
  - Inca Huasi (ancient lake), an ancient lake in Bolivia
- Settlements and administrative divisions
  - Incahuasi, Bolivia, a town and municipality in Chuquisaca Department
  - Incahuasi, Chile, a mining town in Atacama Region
  - Incahuasi District or Inkawasi, a district in the Lambayeque Region, Peru
  - Inkawasi District, a district in the Cusco Region, Peru

== See also ==
- Inkawasi-Kañaris or Lambayeque Quechua, a variety of Quechua
