= Cerro Alto =

Cerro Alto may refer to:

- Cerro Alto (Argentina)
- Cerro Alto (Chile)
- Cerro Alto (San Luis Obispo County, California)
- Cerro Alto (Kings County, California)
- Cerro Alto (Cibola County, New Mexico)
- Cerro Alto (Taos County, New Mexico)
- Cerro Alto (Puerto Rico)
- Cerro El Alto in Puerto Rico
- Cerro Alto Mountain in Texas, USA
