= Cerro de la Muerte =

Mountain peak in Costa Rica

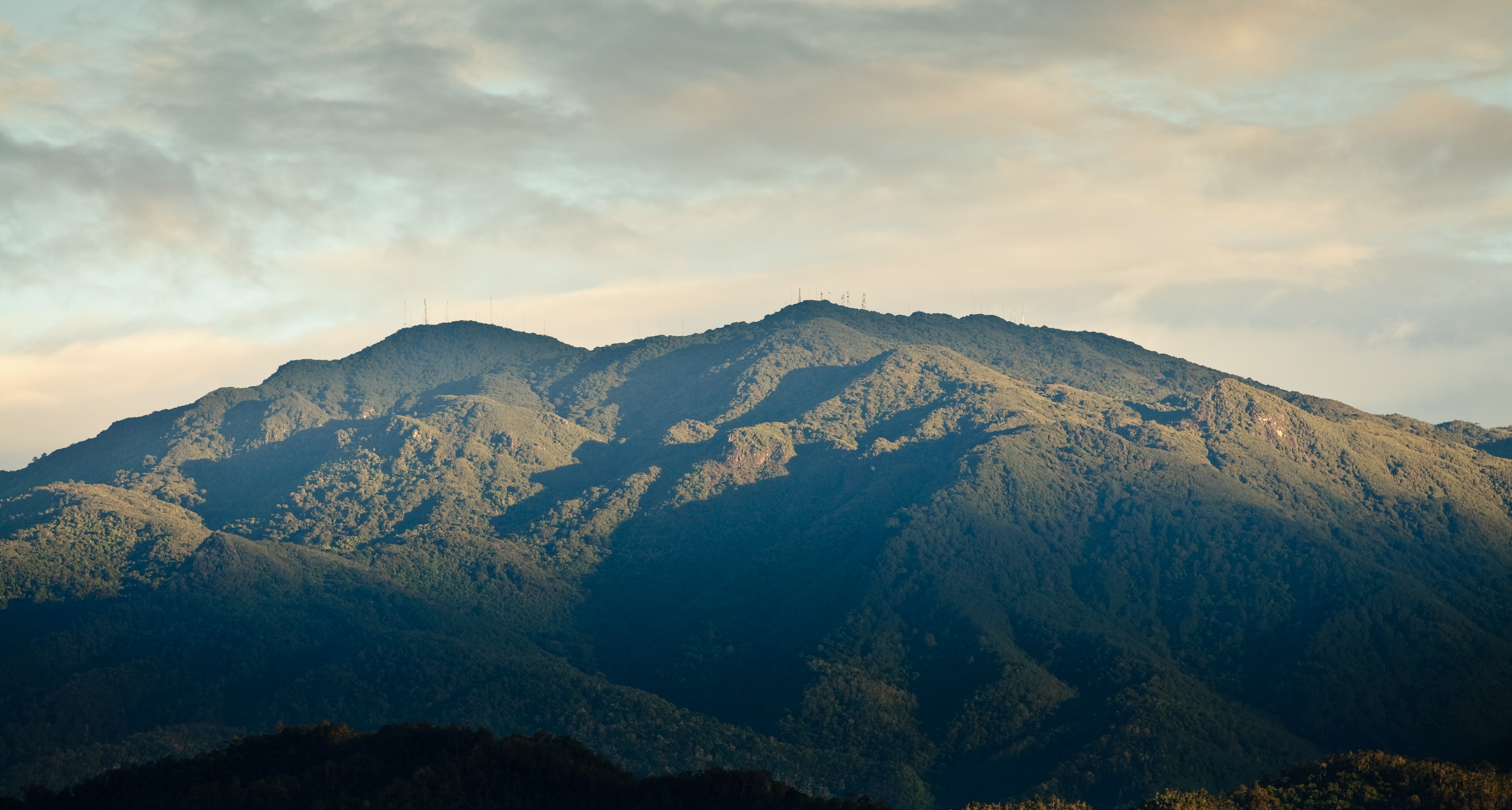
- Cerro de la Muerte from the city of San Isidro

Highest point
- Elevation: 3,451 m (11,322 ft)
- Coordinates: 9°34′N 83°45′W

Geography
- Location within Costa Rica
- Location: Costa Rica
- Parent range: Cordillera de Talamanca

Cerro de la Muerte is a mountain peak in a massif in Costa Rica, it is located within the Tapantí — Cerro de la Muerte Massif National Park, and is the highest point on the Pan-American Highway.

== Toponymy ==
Its name means "Mountain of Death," "Hill of Death," or "Summit of Death." This is because in the past crossing the mountains from the Valle Central meant a three or four day journey on foot or on horseback, and many ill-prepared travelers succumbed to the cold and rain. However, the peak is now easily accessible, as the Pan American Highway runs close by.

== Climate ==
At this altitude, overnight temperatures can dip below freezing, but the sun soon raises the temperatures in the morning, with a high risk of sunburn due to the thin clear air. Record temperatures reach below −6 °C (21 °F).

== Ecology ==
This mountain is in the Talamanca range, which extends from eastern Costa Rica into neighboring western Panama. This range was a volcanic island in the geological past. As a result of tectonic uplift and its separation from other mountain ranges, it has developed many endemic species of animals and plants, often with affinities to Andean forms.

The higher areas are páramo habitat, with stunted shrubs, dwarf bamboo, and tree ferns, and smaller plants like blueberry, gooseberry and lady's slipper. Below this zone, the natural vegetation is oak forest with bamboo understory, an excellent place to see the resplendent quetzal.

Nearly 50% of the bird species recorded from Cerro de la Muerte are endemic to the Talamanca range. These include fiery-throated hummingbird, timberline wren, sooty robin, black-billed nightingale-thrush, peg-billed finch and volcano junco.

== Hiking ==
KM 89, a drivable track from the highway, leads to the peak. A short hike is also available from the highway to another peak marked with a barrel. A sign marks the high point of the highway (Route 2) at 3,335 m (10,942 ft), from where the vehicle track and hiking trail begin.

== Rest Stops ==
Because crossing Cerro de la Muerte took up to five days on foot three resting stations were created by Congressional Decree Number 45, signed on 5 August 1908.

Between 1910 and 1912, the three resting stops, known as houses, were built. They are called "División", "La Muerte" and "Ojo de Agua", at a cost of ₡1,749.47, built at intervals of about 10 to 12 hours of hiking from each other. There was a rule that guests must leave firewood ready for the next guest.

In 1990, the Ministry of Culture recognized the importance of the rest stops, and on November 20, 2016 the "Casa Refugio Ojo de Agua" was restored and is now a small museum.

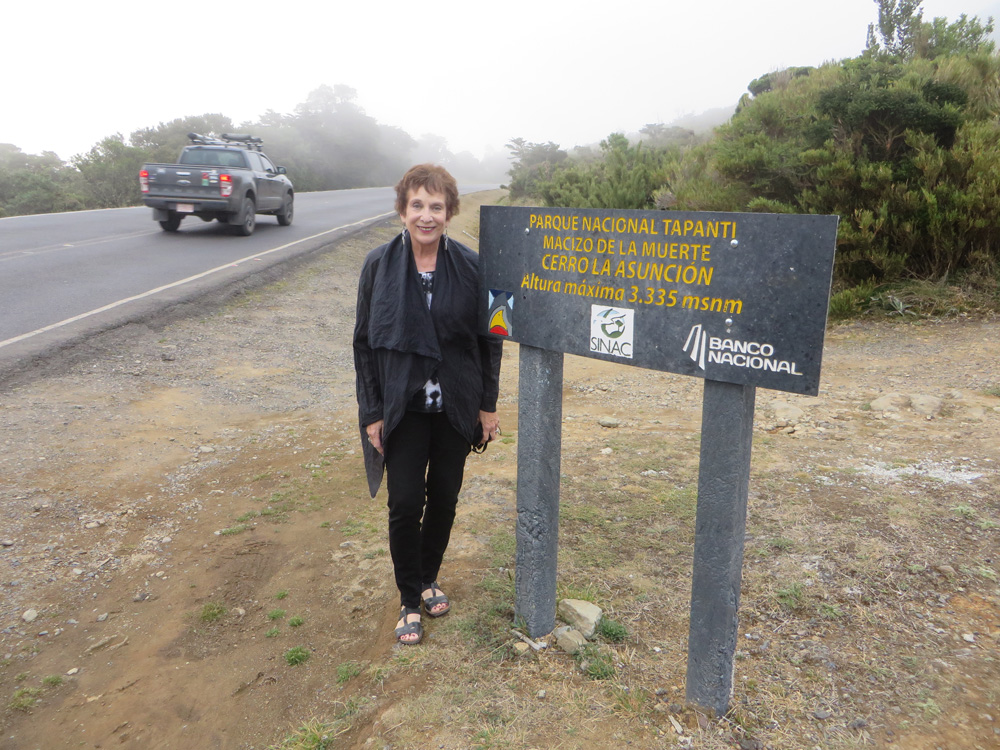
A sign marks the Summit of Death on Costa Rica 2, the Inter-American Highway, elevation 10,942 feet

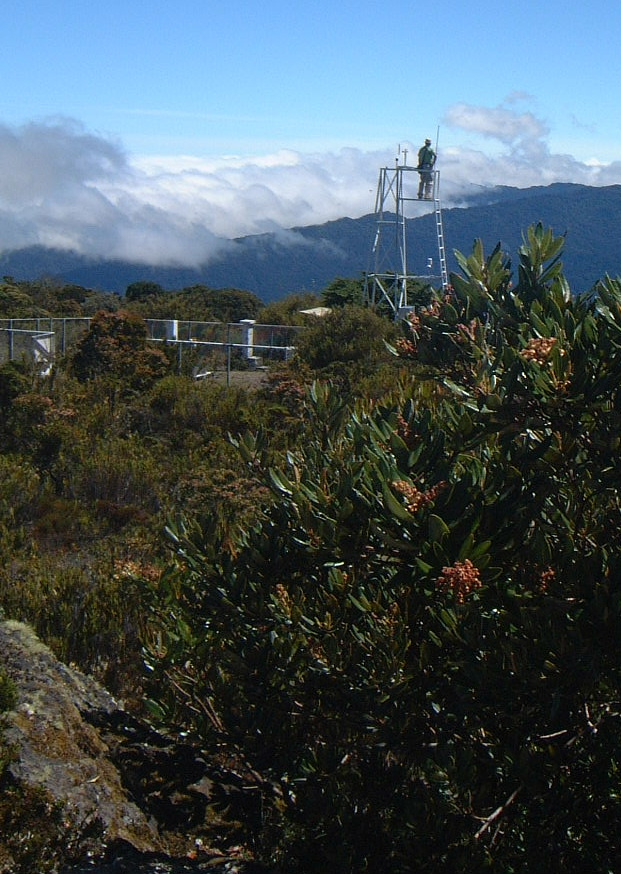
Paramo at the summit

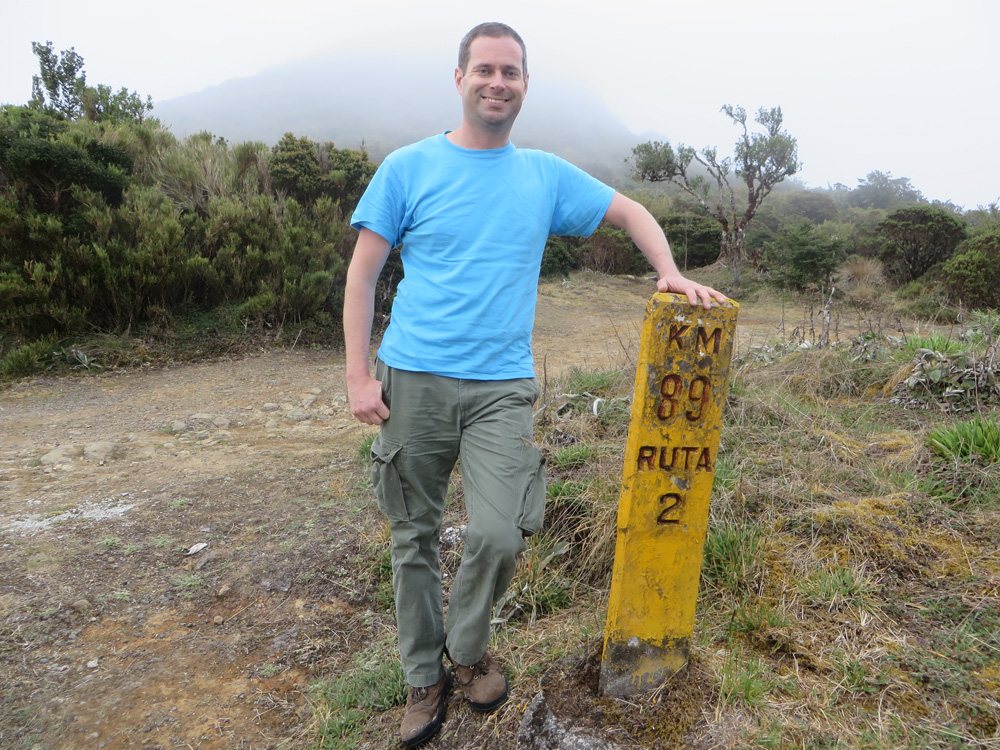
Summit of Death is at KM 89 on Costa Rica 2, the Inter-American Highway

== See also ==
- Cerro de la Muerte Biological Station
