= Picacho Mountain =

Mountain in Panama

- Location within Panama

Highest point
- Elevation: 1,081 m (3,547 ft)
- Coordinates: 8°37′38.87″N 80°02′50.34″W

Geography
- Location: Panama
- Parent range: Central Mountain Range

Picacho Mountain (Spanish: Cerro Picacho) is a mountain in Panama. It is located in San Carlos District on the western side of the Panamá Province. At the base of the peak there is a green lagoon named "Laguna de San Carlos" and the private mountain development Altos del Maria.
