= Cerro Redondo (dome) =

Coordinates: 22°22′S 66°08′W

Cerro Redondo is a lava dome complex in the northern Puna, north of Rinconada. It is situated over the Ordovician basement east of the Sierra de Rinconada. The lava domes were erupted along ring fractures on a preceding fall deposit containing blocks and breccia. Another report indicates just one isolated dacite dome. Intense hydrothermal alteration has occurred on the lavas.

The breccia and pyroclastics are 12.54±1.1 mya old, determined from fission track dating of apatite. The complex may be linked to a caldera together with the neighbouring Chinchillas and Pan de Azúcar centres. Each of them is associated with mineral deposits which were mined on Pan de Azúcar. Cerro Redondo's breccia is flanked by normal faults and one reverse fault is located within the complex.
