= Cerro San Javier =

Mountain in Argentina

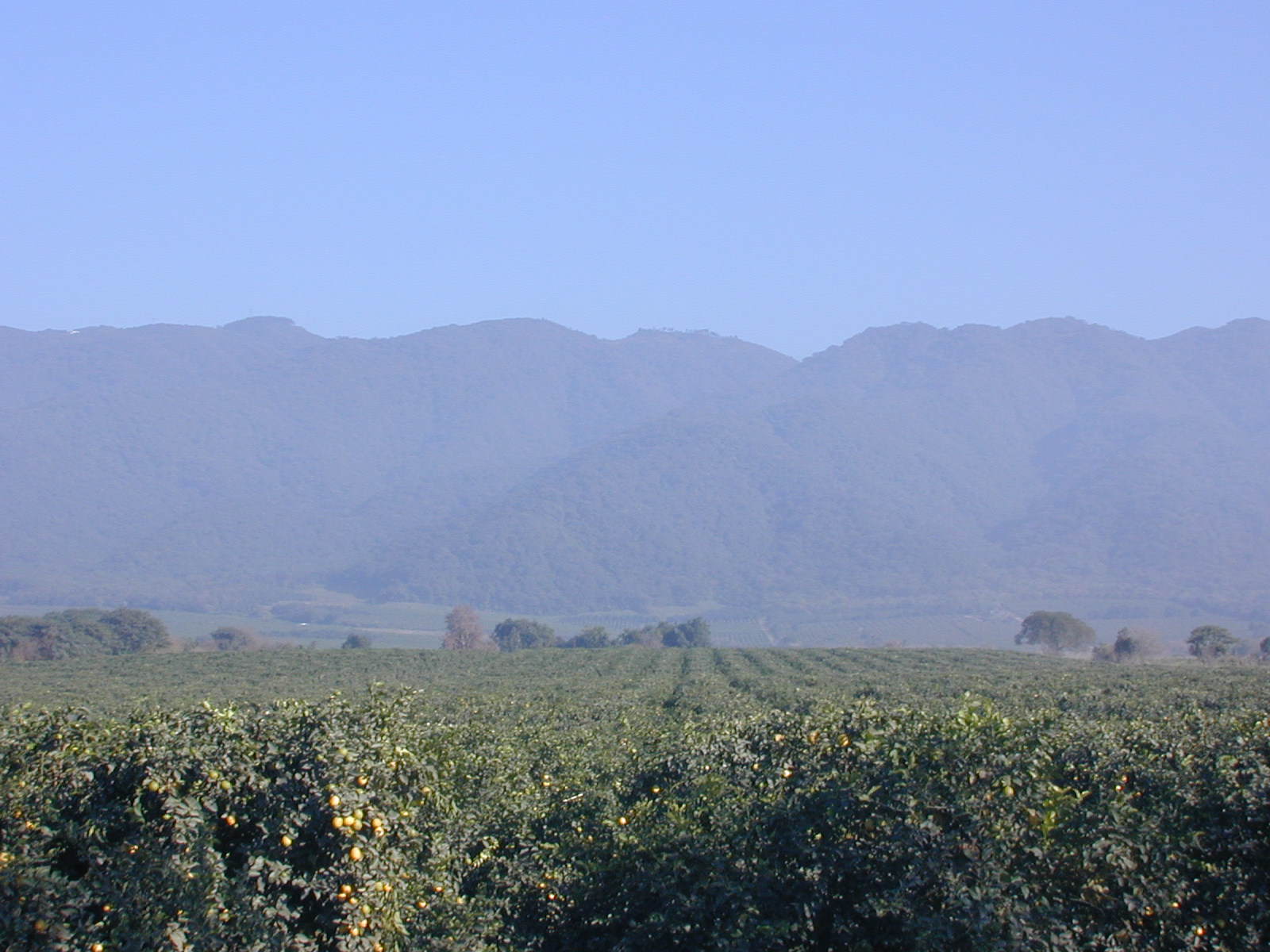
Cerro San Javier

San Javier Hill is a geographical feature, located in the province of Tucumán, Argentina.

== Geography ==
It is about 24 km (15 mi) from the provincial capital, San Miguel de Tucumán. The road to the hill has more than 100 curves and at is bordered by tropical vegetation typical to the region.

The mountain range occupies more than 19,000 hectares (47,000 acres). The summit of Taficillo to the north has a maximum altitude of about 1,876 m (6,155 ft). The dominant vegetation includes cloud forests, jungles, and mountain forests or yungas that host summer villages closest to the city: Villa Nougués, El Siambón, Raco, and San Javier.

== Amenities ==
Sporting activities include paragliding, trekking, horseback riding, mountain biking, hiking, etc.

It offers a beautiful view: towards the west, the capital and its surrounding plain, and on the other side, the green mesas that have the Calchaquíes summits as a background.

The summer village of San Javier is on the ridge of the mountain range, near Yerba Buena, at an altitude of 1,200 m (3,900 ft). El Cristo Bendicente, is a sculpture that stands 28 m (92 ft) high and weighs 135.8 tons, made by the artist from Tucuman, Juan Carlos Iramain. It was inaugurated in 1942, the year of the founding of the Village. Due to its size, it can be seen from the city.

== Climate ==
The temperature is pleasant throughout the year, especially in summer when the temperature is high in San Miguel de Tucumán. In winter, snow falls sporadically
