= Cerro Polapi =

Polapi
- Location within Chile

Highest point
- Elevation: 5,960 m (19,550 ft)
- Prominence: 1,070 m (3,510 ft)
- Parent peak: Palpana
- Coordinates: 21°38′53.51″S 068°23′36.23″W

Geography
- Parent range: Chilean Andes, Andes

Climbing
- First ascent: Not confirmed

Polapi is a peak in Chile with an elevation of 5,960 metres (19,554 ft) metres, at the Puna de Atacama region. It is located within the territory of the Chilean province of El Loa. Its slopes are within the administrative boundaries of two Chilean cities: Calama and Ollagüe.

== Elevation ==
Data from the digital elevation models TanDEM-X yields the 5988 metre elevation. The height of the nearest key col is 4890 meters, leading to a topographic prominence of 1070 meters. Polapi is considered a Mountain Massif according to the Dominance System and its dominance is 17.95%. Its parent peak is Palpana and the Topographic isolation is 17.5 kilometers.
