= Cerro Las Tórtolas =

Mountain in Argentina

Las Tórtolas
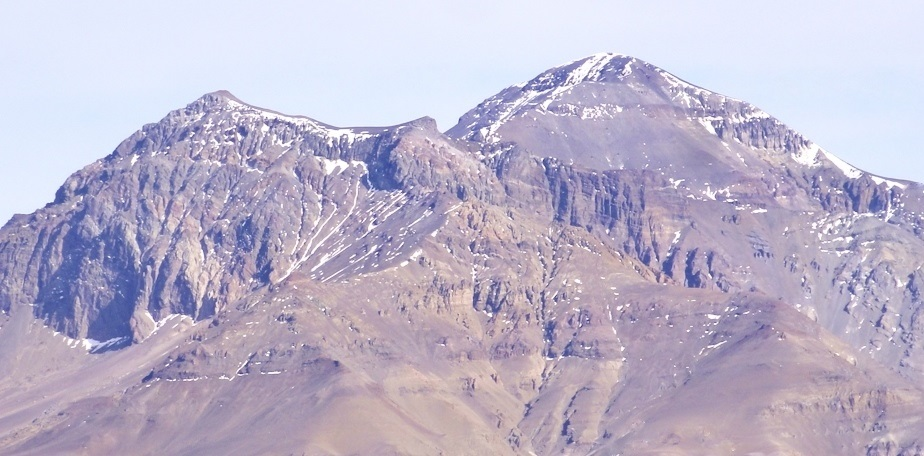

Highest point
- Elevation: 6,145 m (20,161 ft)
- Prominence: 1,377 m (4,518 ft)
- Parent peak: Majadita
- Coordinates: 29°56′19.68″S 069°54′22.68″W

Geography
- Location within Argentina
- Parent range: Chilean Andes, Andes

Climbing
- First ascent: 01/19/1952 - Edgar Kausel (Chile) - Heinz Koch (Germany)

Cerro Las Tórtolas is a peak at the border of Argentina and Chile with an elevation of 6,145 metres (20,161 ft) metres and located at the Central Andes. It is on the border of the Argentinean province of San Juan and the Chilean province of Elqui. Its slopes are within the administrative boundaries of the Argentinean city of Iglesia and the Chilean commune of Vicuña.

== First Ascent ==
The first ascents were made by Indigenous Peoples, who built a platform at the summit and left elaborate figurines there. Las Tórtolas' first recorded ascent post-colonization was by Edgar Kausel (Chile) and Heinz Koch (Germany) on January 19, 1952. There are reports of a 1924 ascent (Hans Duddle) shown in some sources. However no evidence of this expedition was found.

== Elevation ==
It has an official height of 6160 meters. Other data from available digital elevation models: SRTM yields 6130 metres, ASTER 6096 metres, ASTER filled 6130 metres and TanDEM-X 6171 metres. The height of the nearest key col is 4768 meters, leading to a topographic prominence of 1377 meters. Las Tórtolas is considered a Mountain Subrange according to the Dominance System and its dominance is 22.41%. Its parent peak is Majadita and the Topographic isolation is 54.9 kilometers.

== See also ==
- List of mountains in the Andes
