= Cerro Tinte =

Mountain in Bolivia

- Location within Bolivia

Highest point
- Elevation: 5,015 m (16,453 ft)
- Coordinates: 22°40′0″S 67°1′0″W

Geography
- Location: Potosí Department, Bolivia; Jujuy Province, Argentina
- Parent range: Andes

Cerro Tinte is a mountain of the Andes, which is located at the western end of the border between Bolivia and Argentina, near Uyuni, Potosí, Bolivia. The mountain is of volcanic origin. Cerro Tinte is part of a mountain range that serves as a border between Bolivia and Argentina, to which they belong the mountains of La Ramada, Bayo, Panizos, Limitajo, Vilama, Brajma and Zapaleri.

Cerro Tinte is located in an endorheic river basin, characterized by several lagoons in both Argentina and Bolivia.
