= Cerro Deslinde =

Mountain in Chile

Coordinates: 22°16′26″S 67°56′10″W

Cerro Deslinde is a 5,606 metres (18,392 ft) high volcano in Chile, just northeast of the El Tatio geothermal field.

Deslinde was glaciated during the Pleistocene, with moraines occurring at elevations of 4,200 metres (13,800 ft). South of Deslinde, a long glacier developed and spread westward.
