= Cerro Pintado =

Mountain in Colombia and Venezuela

- Location within Colombia

Highest point
- Elevation: 3,660 m (12,010 ft)
- Prominence: 2,181 m (7,156 ft)
- Listing: Ultra
- Coordinates: 10°27′32″N 72°54′11″W

Geography
- Location: Colombia / Venezuela border

Cerro Pintado is a mountain in South America. It has an elevation of 3,660 metres (12,008 ft) above sea level and sits on the international border between Colombia and Venezuela.

A hill by the same name in Amazonas State is host to some of the world's largest prehistoric petroglyphs, including depictions of gigantic snakes and Amazonian giant centipedes.

== See also ==
- List of Ultras of South America
- List of mountains in Colombia
