= Luis del Cerro =

Spanish sports shooter (1924–2019)

Personal information
- Born: 7 May 1924 Barcelona, Spain
- Died: 30 April 2019 (aged 94)

Sport
- Sport: Sports shooting

Luis del Cerro (7 May 1924 – 30 April 2019) was a Spanish sport shooter who competed in the 1968 Summer Olympics, the 1972 Summer Olympics, the 1976 Summer Olympics and in the 1984 Summer Olympics.
