= Cerro Cama =

- Location within Panama
- Coordinates: 9°1′48″N 79°54′36″W
- Country: Panama
- Province: Panamá

Population (2008)
  - Total: 1,420

Cerro Cama is a town in the Panamá Province of Panama.

== Sources ==
- World Gazeteer: Panama – World-Gazetteer.com
