= Cerro Napa =

Pliocene stratovolcano straddling the border between Bolivia and Chile

- Location within Bolivia

Highest point
- Elevation: 5,170 m (16,960 ft)
- Coordinates: 20°30′S 68°40′W

Geology
- Rock age: 1.38 million years

Cerro Napa is a Pliocene stratovolcano north of the Salar de Coposa, straddling the border between Bolivia and Chile.

The 20 kilometres (12 mi) wide volcano rises about 1.4 kilometres (0.87 mi) above its surrounding terrain and has a partially preserved summit crater. Part of its slopes are covered with pyroclastics; radiometric dating has yielded ages of 11.9 ± 0.6, 9.99 ± 0.1 and 1.38 million years ago. In the past the volcano was glaciated, with glaciers descending to elevations of 4,050 metres (13,290 ft). This low elevation probably relates to the easterly position of the volcano and likely correlates to lake highstands in Salar de Coposa, Salar de Empexa and Salar de Huasco.
