= Cerro de Oro =

- Municipality
- Location of Cerro de Oro in Argentina
- Coordinates: 32°22′59″S 65°00′00″W
- Country: Argentina
- Province: San Luis
- Department: Junín
- Elevation: 870 m (2,850 ft)

Population
  - Total: 314 (INDEC 2,001)
- Time zone: UTC−3 (ART)
- CPA base: D5881
- Dialing code: +54 02656

Cerro de Oro is a small town and municipality in Junin Department in Argentina. It is located in the northeast corner of San Luis Province, east of the city of Santa Rosa de Conlara, near the border with Córdoba Province.

It had 314 inhabitants in 2001 (INDEC, 2001), representing an increase of 68% compared to the 187 inhabitants (INDEC, 1991) the previous census.
