= Cerro del Bu =

Archaeological site in Toledo, Spain

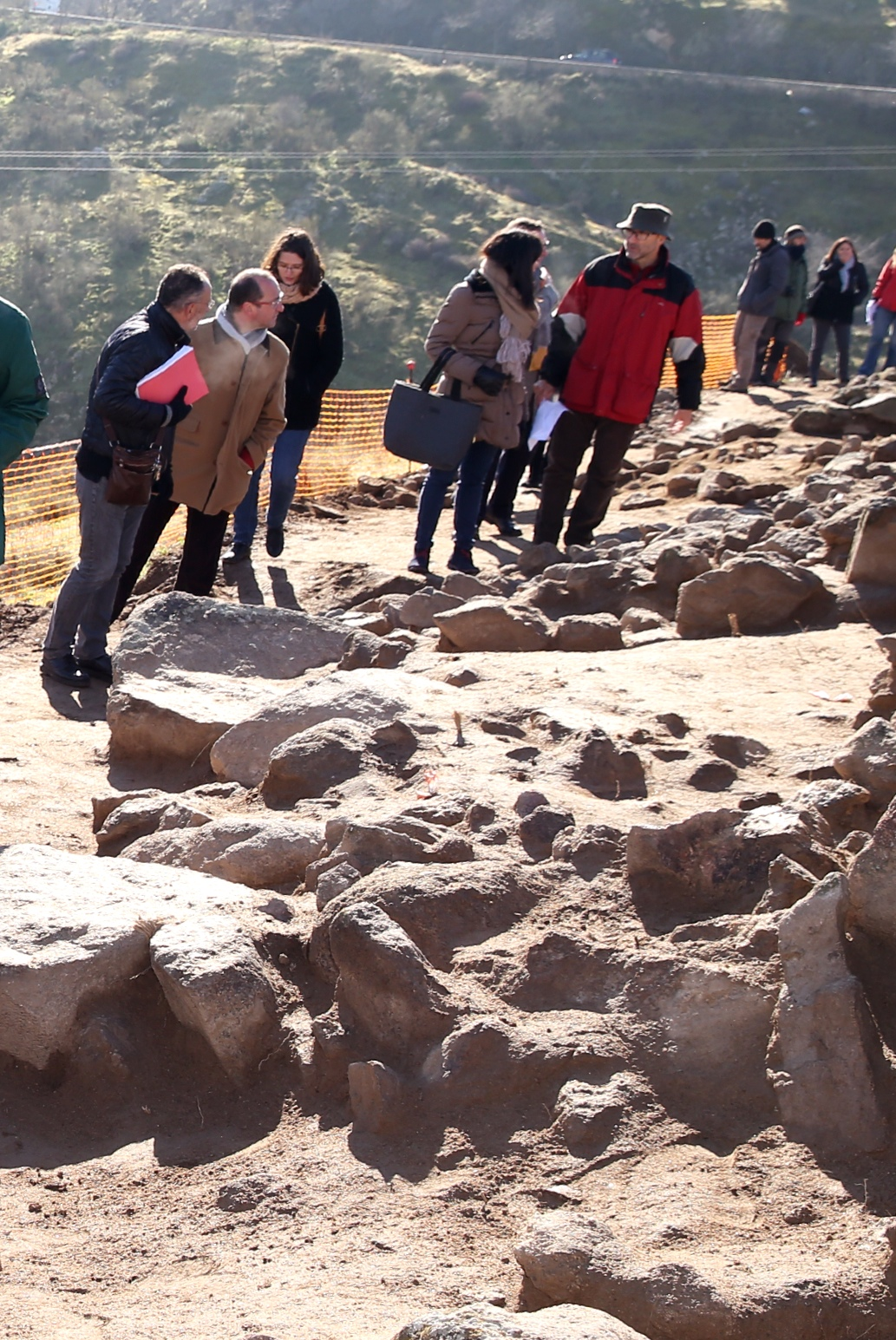
Archaeological site of the Cerro del Bu

The Cerro del Bu is an archaeological site in the Bu hill of the Spanish municipality of Toledo, located on a promontory next to the Tagus river.

== Description ==
The site is located on the hill that gives it its name, which stands on the left bank of the Tagus, south of the city of Toledo. On the surface, the hill had construction stones with ostensible foundations on a ground that, at first glance, was seen to be unnatural.

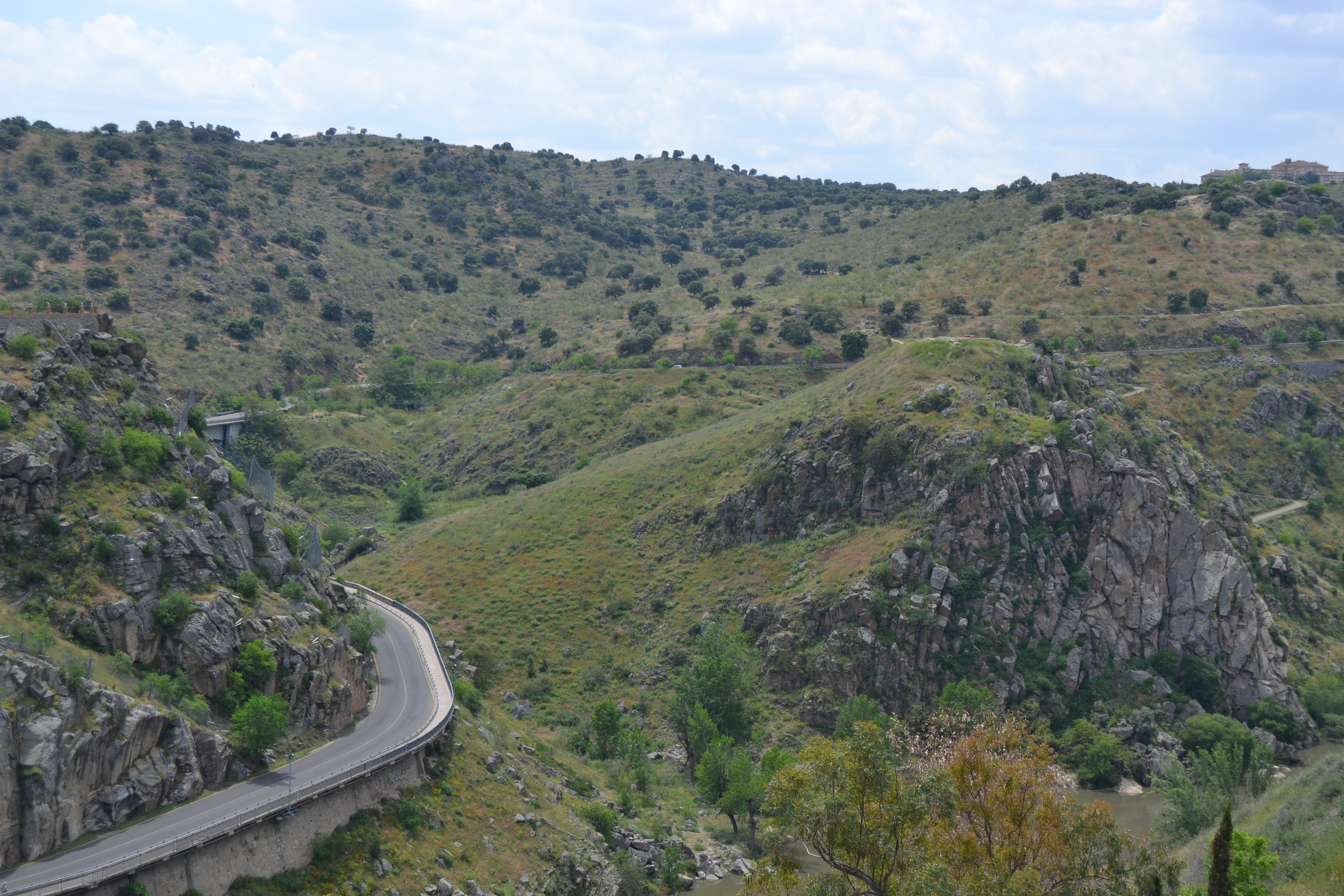
View of the hill

Its location, isolation and steep relief gives the place a strategic nature and privileged natural defense, suitable for settlement of human groups. The research campaigns that regularly carried out on the site, since 1980, revealed a series of consecutive phases in the occupation of the hill. The first phase of settlement would be characterized by the existence of a large quantity of flint carving remains and few ceramic fragments. Its chronology would be doubtful. The second, best documented corresponds to the main time of habitat use, in full development of the Bronze Age in the Meseta Central. The third marks the final phase of the habitat of the aforementioned Bronze Age. In these last two phases, from which habitation structures and cottages and even homes "in situ" have been discovered, an eminently pastoral economy was developed, with the primacy of cattle sheep and bovine. Later there was a medieval settlement, Arab, small and provisional, that responded to a strategic and military conception. From this stage remains are preserved on the top of the hill. The end of this Arabs settlement could be interpreted as an intentional destruction, since although levels of ash are found, the walls would have collapsed before any sign of fire.

== Patrimonial status ==
Cerro del Bu was declared a Bien de Interés Cultural by the autonomous community with the category of archaeological zone on April 28, 1992, by means of a decree published on May 20 of that same year in the Official Gazette of Castile-La Mancha.

== Bibliography ==
- Fernández del Cerro, Jacobo (2014). Aproximación al conocimiento de la Edad del Bronce en la Cuenca Media del Tajo: el Cerro del Bu (Toledo) (PDF). Madrid. ISBN 978-84-942592-2-7.
