= Cerro Tenán =

Mountain in Honduras

- Location within Honduras

Highest point
- Elevation: 1,137 m (3,730 ft)
- Coordinates: 14°39′0″N 88°49′12″W

Geography
- Location: Copán Department, Honduras

Cerro Tenán is located near the village of Ojos de Agua, in the Municipality of Cucuyagua, in the Copán Department of Honduras. Tenán has an altitude of: 1,137 meters or 3,728 feet above sea level.
