= Cerro Cola Blanca Natural Reserve =

Nature reserve in Nicaragua

Coordinates: 14.15201°N 84.45884°W

Cerro Cola Blanca Natural Reserve is a nature reserve in Nicaragua. It is one of the 78 reserves that are under official protection in the country.
