= Cerro Castillo Airport =

- IATA: none; ICAO: SCPY

Summary
- Airport type: Public
- Serves: Cerro Castillo, Chile
- Elevation AMSL: 427 ft / 130 m
- Coordinates: 51°15′37″S 72°20′10″W

Map
- Location of Cerro Castillo Airport in Chile

Runways
Direction	Length		Surface
Direction	m	ft	Surface
08/26	896	2,940	Grass
- Source: Landings.com

Cerro Castillo Airport Spanish: Aeropuerto de Cerro Castillo, (ICAO: SCPY) is an airstrip serving the village and border station at Cerro Castillo, in the Magallanes Region of Chile. Cerro Castillo is 6 kilometres (3.7 mi) west of the border with Argentina.

Runway 26 has an additional 150 metres (490 ft) of unpaved overrun on the west end.

The Puerto Natales VOR-DME (Ident: PNT) is located 28.7 nautical miles (53.2 km) south of the airstrip.

== See also ==
- Transport in Chile
- List of airports in Chile
