= Cerro Castillo Dynevor =

Mountain in Chile

Cerro Castillo
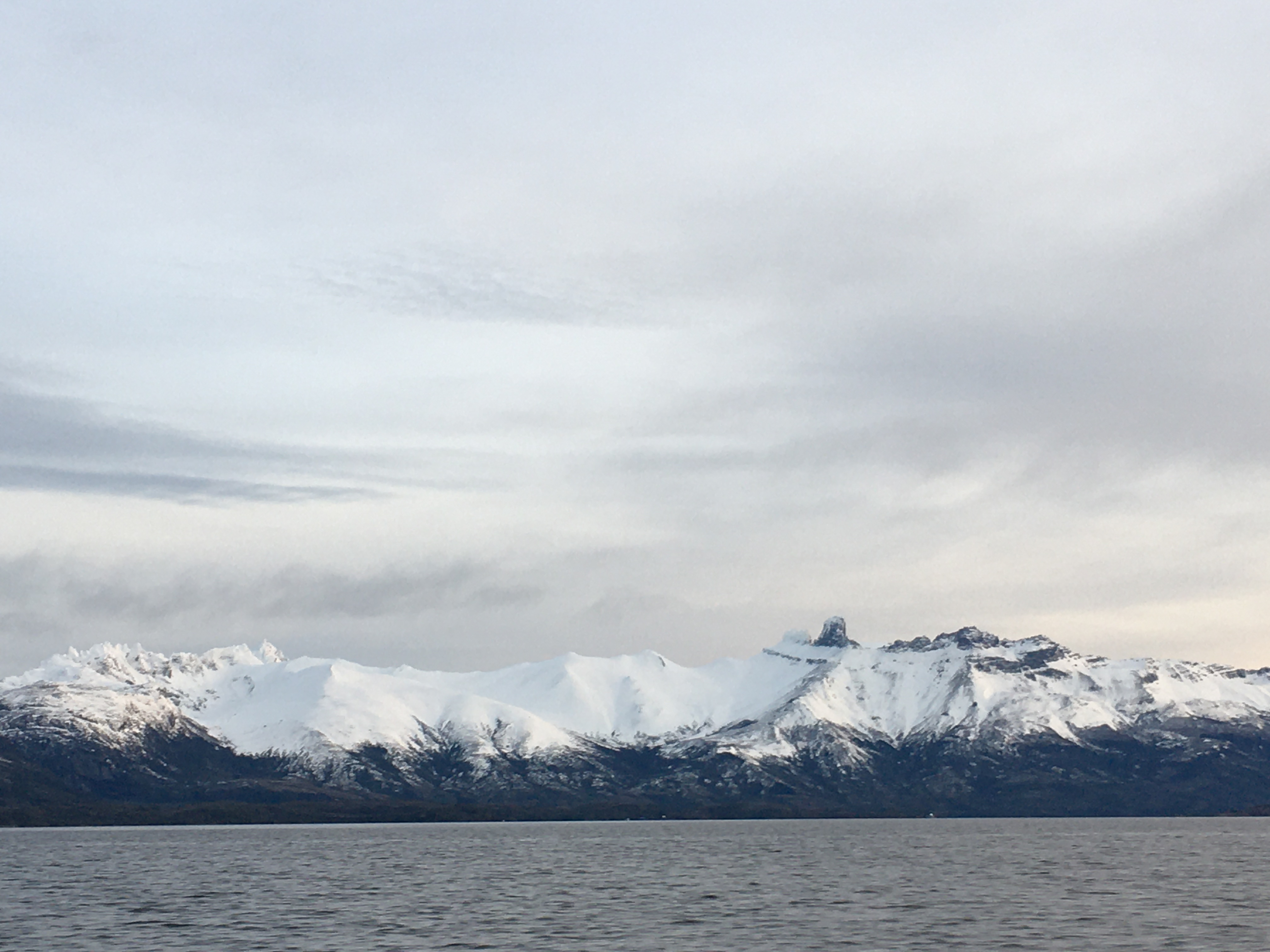
- East - South view of Castillo Dynevor, from Skyring sound.

Highest point
- Elevation: 1,100 m (3,600 ft)
- Coordinates: 52°35′S 72°26′W

Geography
- Location: 120 km NW of Punta Arenas, Chile
- Parent range: Andes

Cerro Castillo Dynevor, also known as Castillo Dynevor is located on the northwest coast of Skyring Sound, in Magallanes Region, Chile. It was named by a British sailor in 1829 after Dynevor Castle in Wales, based on the resemblance of its summit to a fortress.

Its access is quite harsh due to the nature that all roads end about 30 km from it, and the rest of the way must be done either on a 4×4 vehicle, motorcycle, horse or on foot, either way the appropriate track is just by the shore, not through the woods, as they are too dense.

The ascent is initially blocked by Ñirres (Nothofagus antarctica), which makes advance extremely slow. Following the wooden zone, vast masses of peat moss come across and, the final part is a mix between loosen rocks, snow and ice.

This place is nowadays part of María Consuelo Estancia.
