= Cerro de Macuiltépetl =

Mountain in Mexico

Cerro de Macuiltépetl is a mountain of eastern Mexico with an elevation of 1522 metres above sea level. It is located in the Cofre de Perote mountainous area of the municipality of Xalapa, in the state of Veracruz.
