= Cerros Bravos-Barros Negros =

Volcano in Chile

Coordinates: 26°38′S 69°15′W

Cerros Bravos-Barros Negros is a volcanic complex in the Maricunga Belt in Chile. This 200-kilometre-long (120 mi) volcanic belt formed during the Oligocene-Miocene west of the Puna; the present-day Central Volcanic Zone lies northeast of the Maricunga Belt.

The complex is formed by the coalesced Cerros Bravos and Barros Negros volcanoes, and has a width of 25 kilometres (16 mi). Cerros Bravos may have collapsed towards the northeast in its history, ignimbrites may have formed during this collapse. The bulk of the surface area of the complex is formed by lavas; ignimbrites or tuffs and lava domes are subordinate. The Cerros Bravos Ignimbrite covers a surface of 10.57 square kilometres (4.08 sq mi) and other ignimbrites of 20.44 square kilometres (7.89 sq mi). The Esperanza lava dome complex is associated with the volcanoes, it was constructed on the northeast flank of Cerros Bravos. The volcanoes are limited towards the northeast by the Quebrada Salitral and to the southwest by the Quebrada La Cienaga fault. The first of these faults directed the formation of the Esperanza domes.

Rock compositions range from rhyodacite over dacite to andesite. Minerals identified include biotite, hornblende and pyroxene. Epithermal gold and silver is found at Esperanza. In 1993, gold reserves of 120 m.t. and silver reserves of 7,200 m.t. were estimated. These were mostly formed by acid sulfate alteration.

Volcanism at Cerros Bravos-Barros Negros commenced 26-22 million years ago, and were the only stratovolcanoes of the Maricunga Belt from that time. Small ignimbrites formed the first stage of activity, followed lava flows and eventually lava domes. The Esperanza dome complex was emplaced later between 23.2 ± 1.4 to 19.3 ± 0.7 million years ago, accompanied by Plinian eruptions.
