= Cerro Wawashang Natural Reserve =

Nature reserve in Nicaragua

Coordinates: 12.8038°N 84.0090°W

Cerro Wawashang Natural Reserve is a nature reserve in Nicaragua. It is one of the 78 reserves that are under official protection in the country.
