= Cerro de las Cuentas =

Village in Uruguay

- village
- Location within Uruguay
- Coordinates: 32°37′13″S 54°35′34″W
- Country: Uruguay
- Department: Cerro Largo Department
- Elevation: 225 m (738 ft)

Population (2011)
  - Total: 263

Cerro de las Cuentas is a village in the Cerro Largo Department of Uruguay.
