= Cerro Dragón oil field =

Oilfield in Chubut Province, Argentina

Cerro Dragón Oil Field
- Country: Argentina
- Region: Chubut Province
- Offshore/onshore: offshore
- Operator: Pan American Energy

Field history
- Discovery: 1958
- Start of production: 1958

Production
- Current production of oil: 95,000 barrels per day (~4.7×10^{6} t/a)
- Estimated oil in place: 134 million tonnes (~ 200×10^{6} m^{3} or 1000 million bbl)

The Cerro Dragón Oil Field is an oil field located in Chubut Province, Argentina. It was discovered in 1958 and developed by BP. The total proven reserves of the Cerro Dragón oil field are around 1 billion barrels (134 million tonnes), and production is centered on 95,000 barrels per day (15,100 m^{3}/d). The field is part of the Golfo San Jorge Basin, the second-largest hydrocarbon basin in Argentina.

In 2010, BP sold its share of Pan American Energy (PAE) to Bridas Corporation, who now owns the field's concessions. In 2015, PAE obtained a $520 million (USD) loan to expand Cerro Dragón extarction and expand other Argentinian operations. BP and Bridas formed a joint venture in 2017 for Argentinian oil and gas extraction that included Cerro Dragón.

Natural gas and natural-gas condensate are also being extracted from the field. As of March 2026, extraction from the Cerro Dragón field is operated by PAE. Oil extraction rates from Cerro Dragón (and the rest of the Golfo San Jorge Basin) have been declining, leading Pan American to expand shale gas extraction and to treat the basin as an unconventional hydrocarbon source beginning in 2025.
