= Cerro Arco =

Peak in the Andes mountain range

Coordinates: 32°50′11″S 68°56′04″W

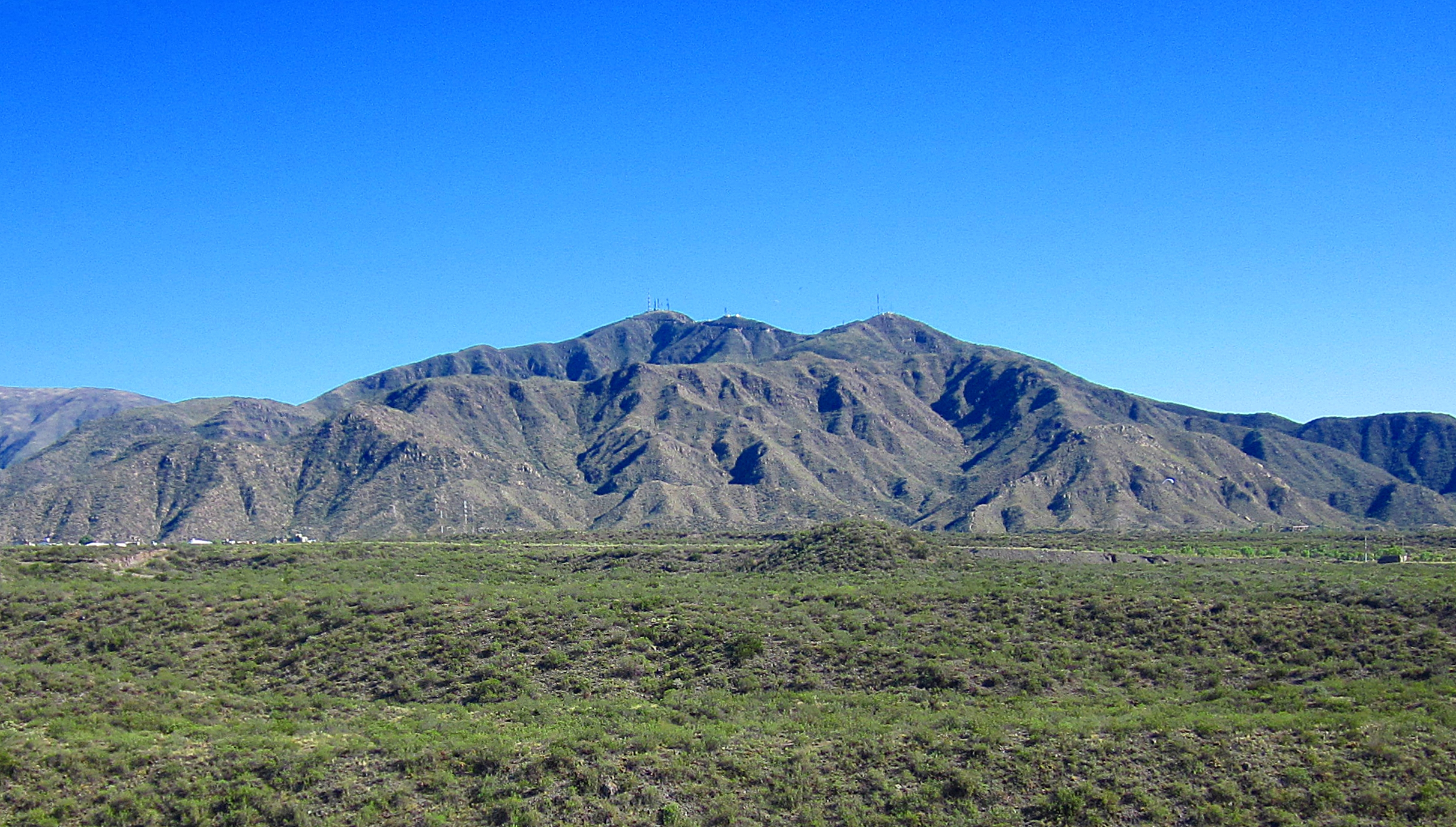

Highest point
- Elevation: 1,668 m (5,472 ft)

Geography

Cerro Arco is a peak in the foothills of the Andes mountain range, located in the outskirts of the city of Mendoza, Argentina, in the municipality of El Challao, Las Heras Department. The peak has an elevation of 1668 meters; the trail to the summit climbs 543 meters.

The peak is named after Antonio Arcos, a Chilean military engineer and banker originally from Spain. Arcos was a sergeant-major in General José de San Martín's army and contributed to the geographical survey of the Andes prior to their crossing.

The area around the peak is used for hiking, mountain biking, and trail running, and the peak is known for the large amount of radio antennas on its summit. Legends about supernatural phenomena or characters are common in this sector of the foothills, such as the legend of the "Futre" or the energetic stone of Isidris.

In September 2018 the hill suffered a fire due to dryness and human negligence, which caused significant damage to the forest (200,000 hectares affected) and uncertainty in the entire population bordering the hill.

== Gallery ==
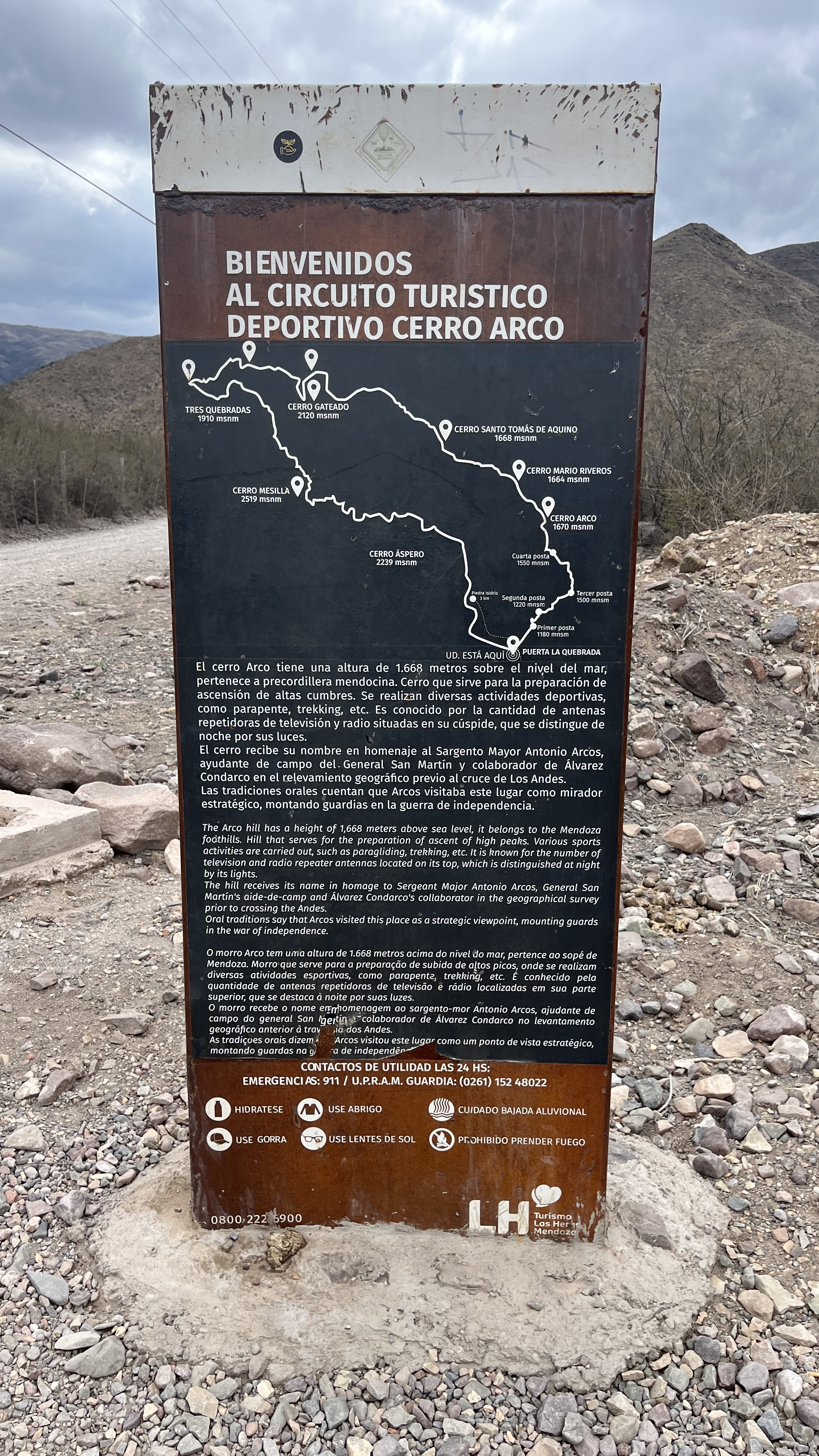
Interpretive sign at the start of Cerro Arco trail

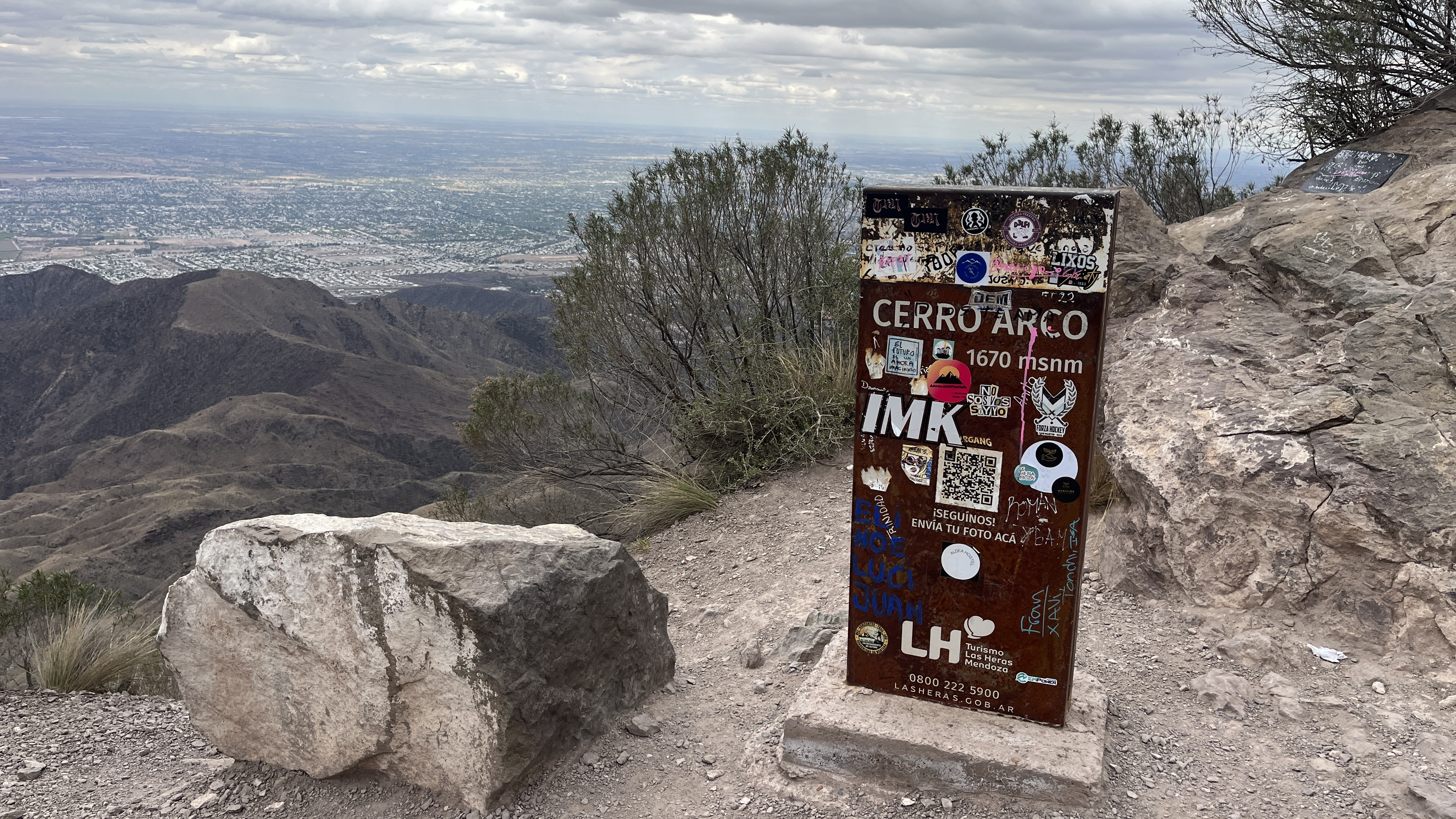
View from the summit of Cerro Arco
