= Cerro Caquella =

Mountain in Bolivia

Caquella
- Location within Bolivia

Highest point
- Elevation: 5,965 m (19,570 ft)
- Prominence: 1,486 m (4,875 ft)
- Parent peak: Acamarachi
- Coordinates: 21°29′26.88″S 067°55′52.67″W

Geography
- Parent range: Bolivian Andes, Andes

Climbing
- First ascent: 08/25/1984 - Anton Putz and Ria Putz (Germany)

Caquella is a peak in Bolivia with an elevation of 5,965 metres (19,570 ft) metres. Caquella is within the following mountain ranges: Bolivian Andes and Cordillera Occidental de Bolivia. It is located within the territory of the Bolivian province of Nor Lipez and Its slopes are within the administrative boundaries of the Bolivian commune of Colcha K (V.Martin).

== First Ascent ==
Caquella was first climbed by Anton Putz and Ria Putz (Germany) August 25, 1984.

== Elevation ==
Other data from available digital elevation models: ASTER 5950 metres and TanDEM-X 5991 metres. The height of the nearest key col is 4479 meters, leading to a topographic prominence of 1486 meters. Caquella is considered a Mountain Range according to the Dominance System and its dominance is 24.91%. Its parent peak is Acamarachi and the Topographic isolation is 202.9 kilometers.
