= Cerro Pantoja =

Mountain in Argentina

Cerro Pantojo
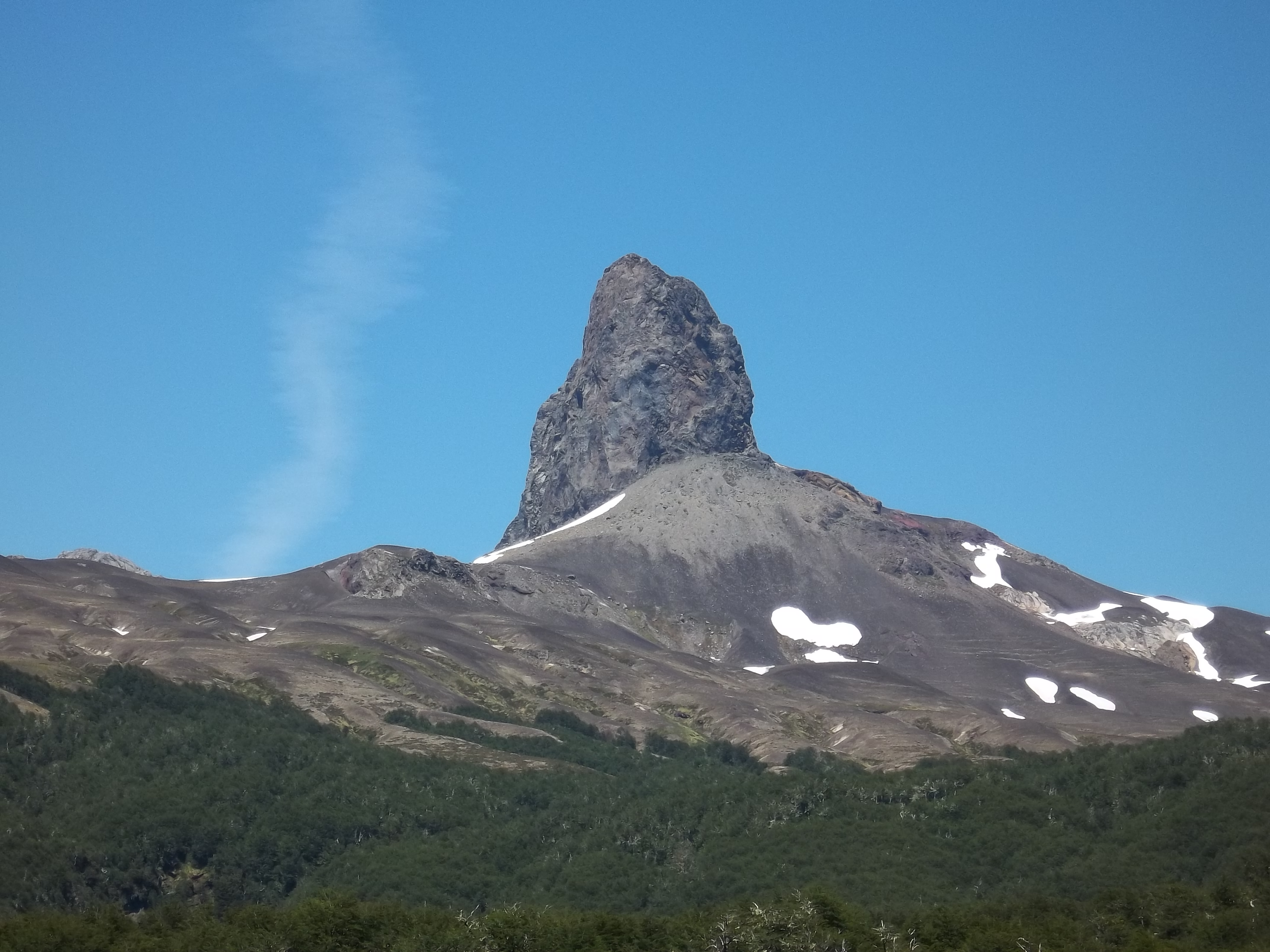

Highest point
- Elevation: 2,024 m (6,640 ft)
- Coordinates: 40°46′0″S 71°57′0″W

Geography
- Location: Argentina/Chile
- Parent range: Andes

Geology
- Mountain type: Stratovolcano
- Last eruption: Unknown

Cerro Pantojo is an extinct basaltic stratovolcano on the border of Argentina and Chile. It lies immediately south of Cardenal Antonio Samoré Pass and its characteristic spire-shaped summit is an eroded volcanic plug. It also has flank lava flows.

== See also ==
- List of volcanoes in Chile
- List of volcanoes in Argentina
