= Cerro Amay =

Mountain in Guatemala

Cerro Amay is a mountain in the Quiché Department of Guatemala, centered near -90.77 W, 15.48 N. The mountain is affiliated with, but not part of, the Cuchumatanes Mountains, which lie to its west, and with the Sierra De Chama. Cerro Amay is topographically distinct and is notable for the Cerro Amay Cloud Forest, a tract of mostly virgin cloud forest covering approximately 19,000 hectares or approximately 46,000 acres. Cerro Amay gets its name from Spanish and Kek'chi, a Mayan language. Cerro means 'mountain' and Amay means 'difficult to survive.' Cerro Amay has been little-studied by scientists because of its remoteness and the fact that few people know about it. Based upon geological maps, Cerro Amay is located directly on Chixoy-Polochic Geological Fault System that comprises the geological boundary between North America and South America., and is thus as close as possible to the site of the Great American Interchange. The Chixoy-Polochic Fault remains active and earthquakes are not uncommon, suggesting that Cerro Amay may still be growing. The highest point at Cerro Amay is approximately 2,615 meters (8,579 feet) above sea level. Cerro Amay is defined on its west side by the Putul River, and on its east side, the Chixoy River, which is the headwater of the Usumacinta. A steep southern escarpment defines the southern side of Cerro Amay and the north side slopes gradually down to an elevation of approximately 700 meters above sea level. The largest city close to Cerro Amay is Uspantan, approximately 13 kilometers southwest of the southern escarpment of Cerro Amay.

Much or most of Cerro Amay is comprised by gray limestone and much of that has been moderately or significantly metamorphosed, and includes quartzite veins, especially at lower elevations. High annual rainfall and earthquakes have facilitated the development of caves that extend into the limestone. One cave known as Dragon Cave contains stalactites, stalagmites, flowstone, popcorn, soda straws, and helictites. From the land surface, many of these caves descend vertically downward and have a roughly circular cross-section at the surface. The geology is karst-like but the limestone has been modified by metamorphosis. Karstic processes including dissolution, cave formation, and growth of speleothems continue.

As a result of the fractured, porous bedrock at Cerro Amay, rainfall does not pool and there are few streams. Instead, precipitation descends deep into the earth until a non-porous stratum is reached and subterranean water flows northward until much of it surfaces as springs and waterfalls at an elevation of approximately 1,350 meters above sea level into the drainage of the Cuatro Chorros River. Some of the limestone bedrock is somewhat fossiliferous but metamorphosis has rendered most fossils of poor quality.

The vegetation at Cerro Amay is dominated by tropical montane cloud forest—a type of broadleaf evergreen rainforest. This forest is incurring ongoing illegal deforestation, driven mainly by small scale agriculture. Cerro Amay is home to various species of plants and animals on the IUCN Red list of threatened species. A small number of organizations are working to protect the Cerro Amay environment.
