= Cerro El Reformador =

National park in El Progreso, Guatemala

Cerro El Reformador National Park
- Location: El Progreso (department), Guatemala
- Area: 0.60 km^{2} (0.23 sq mi)
- Established: Acuerdo Gubernativo 26-05-55
- Operator: CONAP

Cerro El Reformador is a hill located in El Progreso, Guatemala. The hill is covered with dry shrubland and offers a panoramic point view of the surrounding landscape.

A small area of 0.6 km^{2} was declared a national park in 1955.
