= Cerro Grande, Rio Grande do Sul =

Municipality of Brazil

Coordinates: 30°36′S 51°45′W

- Municipality
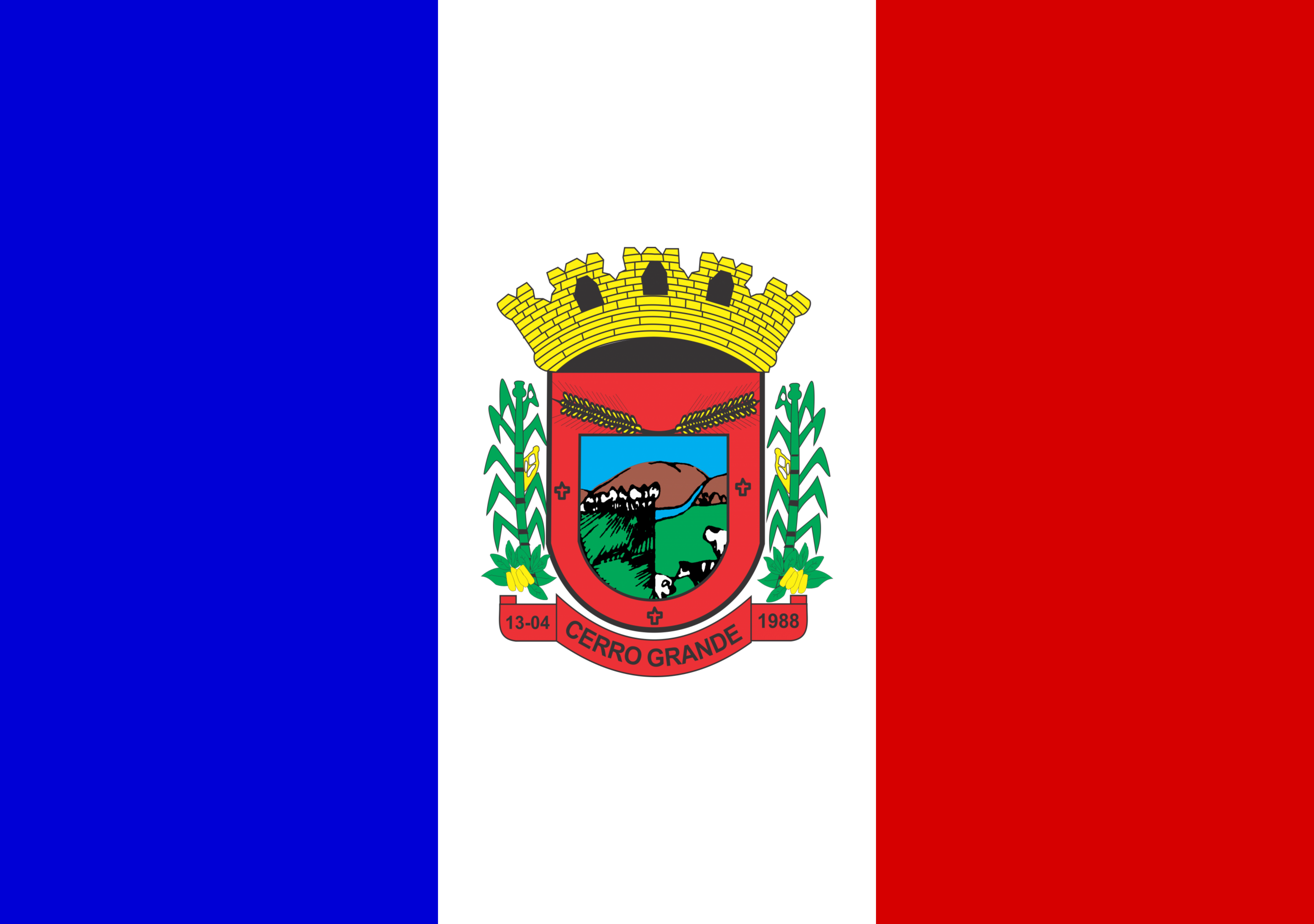
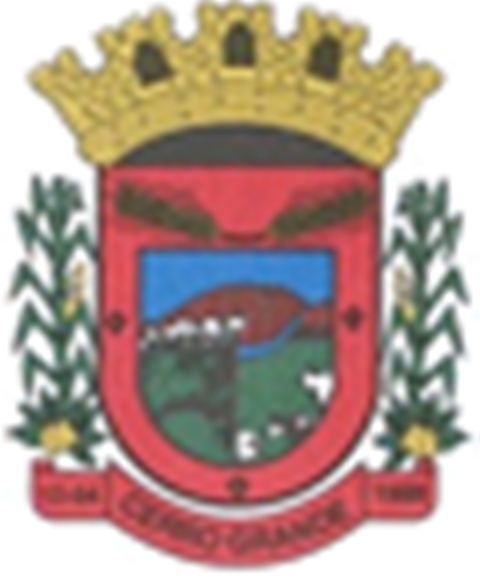
- Flag Coat of arms
- Interactive map of Cerro Grande, Rio Grande do Sul
- Country: Brazil
- Time zone: UTC−3 (BRT)

Cerro Grande is a municipality in the state of Rio Grande do Sul, Brazil. As of 2020, the estimated population was 2,296.

== See also ==
- List of municipalities in Rio Grande do Sul
