= Cerro Steffen =

Mountain in Chile

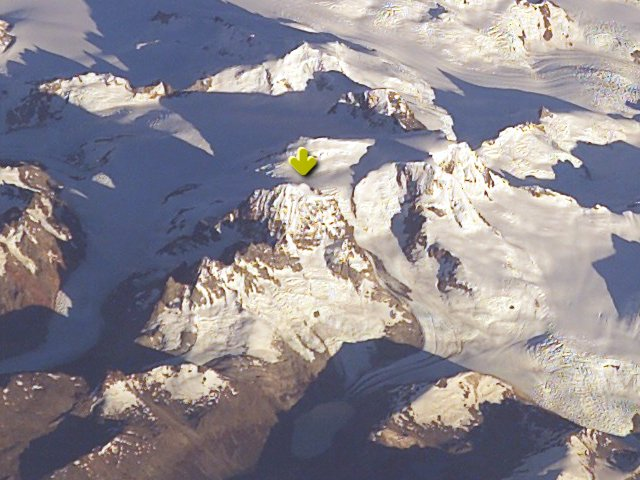
- Cerro Steffen indicated by an arrow.

Highest point
- Elevation: 3,056 m (10,026 ft)
- Coordinates: 48°33′03″S 73°08′56″W

Geography
- Location: Chile
- Parent range: Andes

Climbing
- First ascent: 1965 by Pedro and Jorge Skvarca

Cerro Steffen is one of the highest mountains in the Southern Patagonian Ice Field. It lies on the northeastern edge of the just mentioned icefield, west of O'Higgins Lake.
