= Cerro Mombachito–La Vieja Natural Reserve =

Nature reserve in Nicaragua

Coordinates: 12.41330°N 85.55122°W

Cerro Mombachito – La Vieja Natural Reserve
- Interactive map of Cerro Mombachito – La Vieja Natural Reserve
- Location: Nicaragua

Cerro Mombachito – La Vieja Natural Reserve is a nature reserve in Nicaragua. It is one of the 78 reserves that are under official protection in the country.
