= Cerro del Diablo =

Foothill in Ponce, Puerto Rico, United States

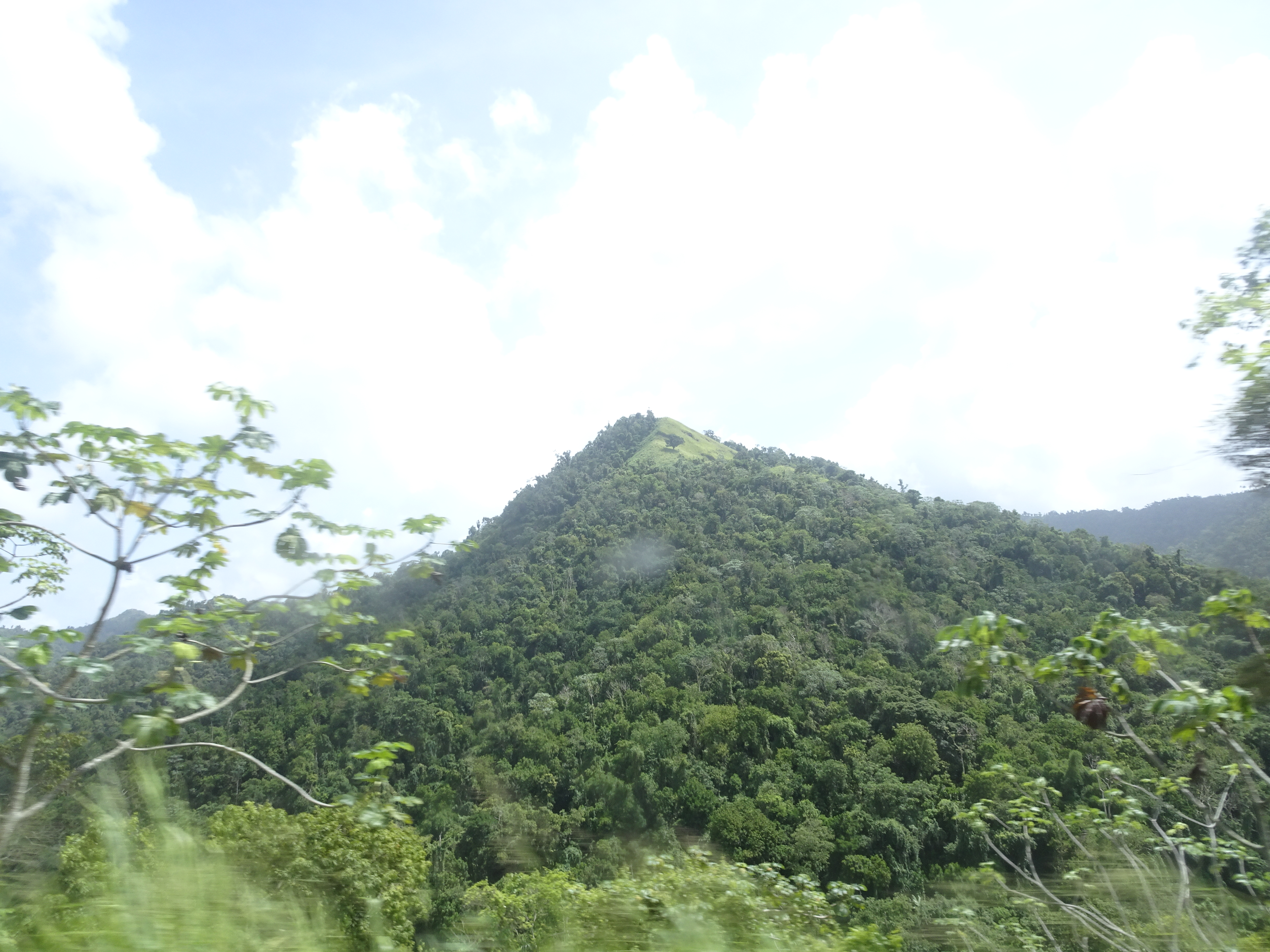
- Cerro del Diablo as seen from PR-10, looking east

Highest point
- Elevation: 2,234 ft (681 m)
- Prominence
- Listing: 1609909
- Coordinates: 18°06′12″N 66°38′05″W

Geography
- Location within Puerto Rico
- Location: Ponce, Puerto Rico
- Parent range: Cordillera Central

Climbing
- Easiest route: PR-10 to PR-503, Ponce, Puerto Rico

Cerro del Diablo (Spanish for devil's peak) is a mountain in the municipality of Ponce, Puerto Rico, located north-northwest of the city of Ponce. The 2,234-foot high hill sits at the foothills of the Cordillera Central and is located in Barrio Tibes.

== Location and geology ==
The hill is part of the Cordillera Central and is located north-northwest of Ponce in Barrio Tibes. It is located at coordinates 18° 06' 12", -66° 38' 05". Rio Portugues borders the mountain to the west.

== Best view and road access ==
The best road for access to the top of the hill is PR-503.
