= Cerro Coposa =

Mountain in Chile

Coordinates: 20°40′S 68°47′W

Cerro Coposa is a mountain in the Andes of Chile. It has a height of 4668 metres.

== See also ==
- List of mountains in the Andes
