= USS Cero =

USS Cero has been the name of more than one United States Navy ship, and may refer to:

- USS Cero (SP-1189), a patrol boat commissioned in 1917 and lost in 1918.
- USS Cero (SS-225), a submarine in commission from 1943 to 1946 and from 1952 to 1953.
