= Cerro Musún Natural Reserve =

Nature reserve in Nicaragua

Coordinates: 12.980251°N 85.2537133°W

Cerro Musún Natural Reserve is a nature reserve in Nicaragua. It is one of the 78 reserves that are under official protection in the country.
