= Cerro Congolón =

Mountain in Honduras

- Location within Honduras

Highest point
- Elevation: 890 m (2,920 ft)
- Coordinates: 14°51′N 88°22′W

Geography
- Location: Lempira Department, Honduras

Cerro Congolón or "Montaña Congolón" is a mountain located in the Lempira Department of Honduras, declared a National Historic Landmark of Honduras by the National Congress of Honduras in 2010.
