= Cerro Colorado (Baja California) =

Mountain in Tijuana Municipality, Mexico

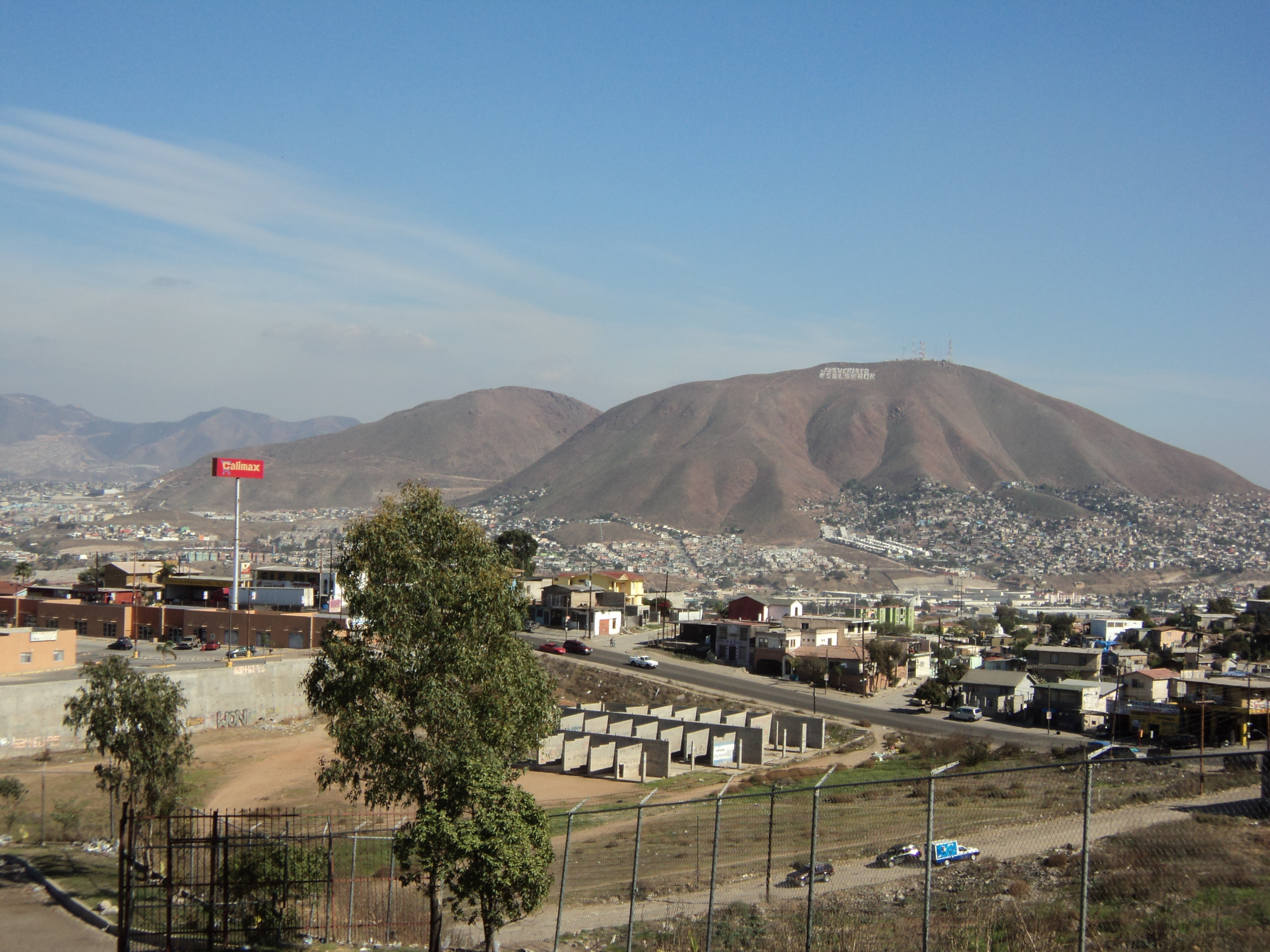

Highest point
- Elevation: 550 m (1,800 ft)
- Coordinates: 32°28′27″N 116°53′49″W

Geography
- Location within Mexico
- Location: Tijuana, Baja California, Mexico

Cerro Colorado is a mountain located in the city of Tijuana. It is one of the highest elevations within the urban area and the most iconic due to its shape and location.

== Geological background ==
Cerro Colorado is named for the characteristic reddish color of its land, which is clearly visible during the dry season. It is made up of two "hills", the one flanking the south being one of the highest elevations in Tijuana and has been considered a reference icon throughout the city's history. Until the 1980s, it was an almost unpopulated area, but starting in the 1990s, the greatest urban growth in Tijuana occurred in its surroundings and currently the urban sprawl has completely surrounded it, and even climbed its slopes to surround a quarter of its surface, leaving Cerro Colorado practically in the geographical center of the city. In 1999, radio and television stations were installed on its summit, taking advantage of its elevation.

Due to its magnificent elevation above the rest of the city, Cerro Colorado is constantly visited by those who like a good view of its surroundings. In January 2017, the "Declaration of destination for a special area of Conservation of Cerro Colorado” in order to protect it from the arrival of inhabitants on its slopes. The nature of the soil in Cerro Colorado is varied; however, materials of sedimentary origin are the most abundant, secondly, rocks of volcanic origin and finally, igneous and metamorphic rocks.

== Flora and fauna ==
Throughout the majority of the year, Cerro Colorado does not have vegetation on the southern and eastern flanks, due to the high temperatures in the region and frequent grass fires. On part of the north and west slopes, as well as on the top, chaparral vegetation typical of the region grows and is resistant to drought, such as jojoba, biznagas and other cacti, and also maintains its own fauna, such as hares, rabbits, roadrunners, field mice, hawks, crows and rattlesnakes, this being a small ecosystem, one that is not found in other parts of the city.

== Weather ==
The climate maintains the same average temperature as the rest of the city, although it is bathed profusely by night breezes, and has recorded occasional frosts when winter temperatures drop sufficiently. Sometimes, with the arrival of cold fronts, the top of Cerro Colorado is covered with snow or hail, which is why it occasionally whitens.
