= Cerro Paranal Airport =

- IATA: none; ICAO: SCPA

Summary
- Airport type: Private
- Serves: Cerro Paranal, Chile
- Elevation AMSL: 6,834 ft / 2,083 m
- Coordinates: 24°38′20″S 70°20′55″W

Map
- Location of Cerro Paranal Airport in Chile

Runways
Direction	Length		Surface
Direction	m	ft	Surface
01/19	1,200	3,937	Gravel
- Source: Landings.com Google Maps GCM

Cerro Paranal Airport (ICAO: SCPA) is a desert airport 6 kilometres (4 mi) east-southeast of Cerro Paranal, Antofagasta, Chile. It serves the Paranal Observatory and Cerro Armazones Observatory scientific complexes.

There is rising terrain west of the airport.

== See also ==
- Transport in Chile
- List of airports in Chile
