= Cerro Corá, Misiones =

Cerro Corá (Misiones)
- Municipality and village
- Location within Misiones Province Location within Argentina
- Country: Argentina
- Province: Misiones Province
- Time zone: UTC−3 (ART)

Cerro Corá (Misiones) is a village and municipality in Misiones Province in north-eastern Argentina.
