= Cerro Moneda =

- Locality and town
- Location in Mexico
- Coordinates: 17°00′45″N 95°55′09″W
- Country: Mexico
- State: Oaxaca
- Elevation: 1,383 m (4,537 ft)

Population (2010)
  - Total: 546 hab
- Time zone: UTC-6 (Central Standard Time)
  - Summer (DST): UTC-5 (Central Daylight Time)
- Postal code: 70290

Cerro Moneda is a town located in Oaxaca.
