= Cerro Azul, Misiones =

Cerro Azul
- Municipality and village
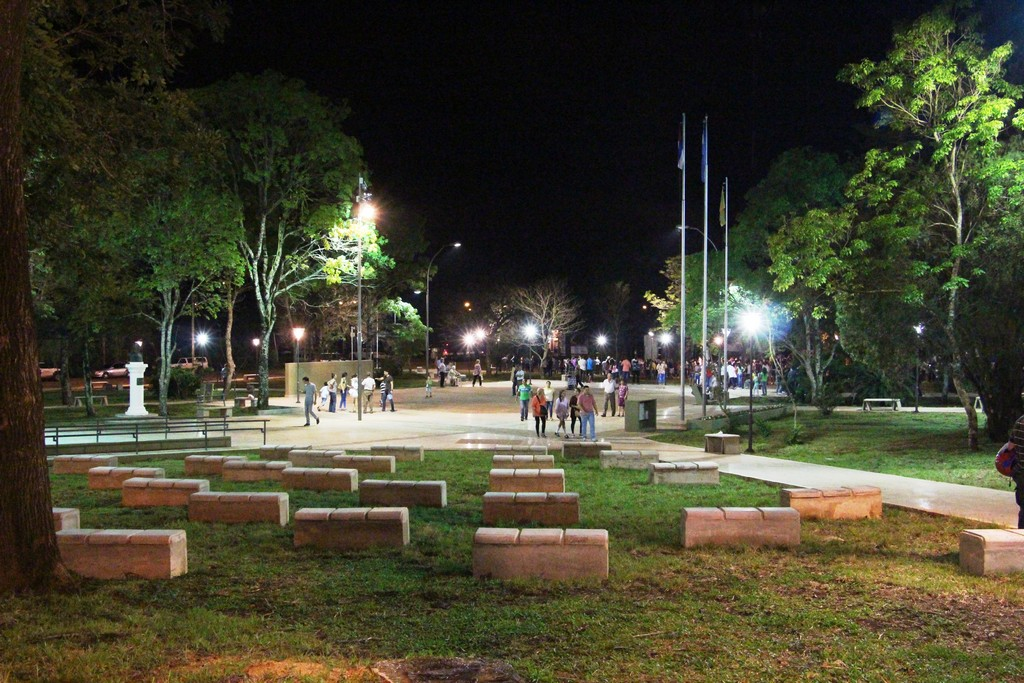

- Location within Misiones Province Location within Argentina
- Coordinates: 27°38′04″S 55°29′48″W
- Country: Argentina
- Province: Misiones
- Time zone: UTC−3 (ART)

Cerro Azul is a village and municipality in Misiones Province in north-eastern Argentina.

== Climate ==
Climate data for Cerro Azul, Misiones (1981–2010)
Month	Jan	Feb	Mar	Apr	May	Jun	Jul	Aug	Sep	Oct	Nov	Dec	Year
Mean daily maximum °C (°F)	31.8 (89.2)	30.8 (87.4)	29.9 (85.8)	26.3 (79.3)	22.6 (72.7)	20.7 (69.3)	20.8 (69.4)	23.3 (73.9)	24.1 (75.4)	27.1 (80.8)	29.0 (84.2)	31.1 (88.0)	26.4 (79.5)
Daily mean °C (°F)	26.2 (79.2)	25.5 (77.9)	24.5 (76.1)	21.4 (70.5)	18.0 (64.4)	16.2 (61.2)	15.9 (60.6)	18.0 (64.4)	18.8 (65.8)	21.6 (70.9)	23.3 (73.9)	25.4 (77.7)	21.2 (70.2)
Mean daily minimum °C (°F)	20.7 (69.3)	20.2 (68.4)	19.2 (66.6)	16.6 (61.9)	13.4 (56.1)	11.8 (53.2)	11.1 (52.0)	12.8 (55.0)	13.6 (56.5)	16.2 (61.2)	17.6 (63.7)	19.6 (67.3)	16.0 (60.8)
Average precipitation mm (inches)	172.3 (6.78)	189.0 (7.44)	152.7 (6.01)	211.7 (8.33)	160.8 (6.33)	148.7 (5.85)	109.8 (4.32)	107.0 (4.21)	165.3 (6.51)	230.3 (9.07)	170.4 (6.71)	182.8 (7.20)	2,000.9 (78.78)
Average relative humidity (%)	68	72	72	75	76	78	73	68	69	69	66	65	71
Mean monthly sunshine hours	266.6	220.4	229.4	186.0	186.0	150.0	176.7	182.9	174.0	210.8	249.0	269.7	2,501.5
Percentage possible sunshine	62.8	60.3	60.8	54.6	56.4	48.5	54.0	52.7	48.6	53.5	61.8	63.2	56.4
Source: Instituto Nacional de Tecnología Agropecuaria
