= Cerro El Plata =

Andean mountain in Argentina

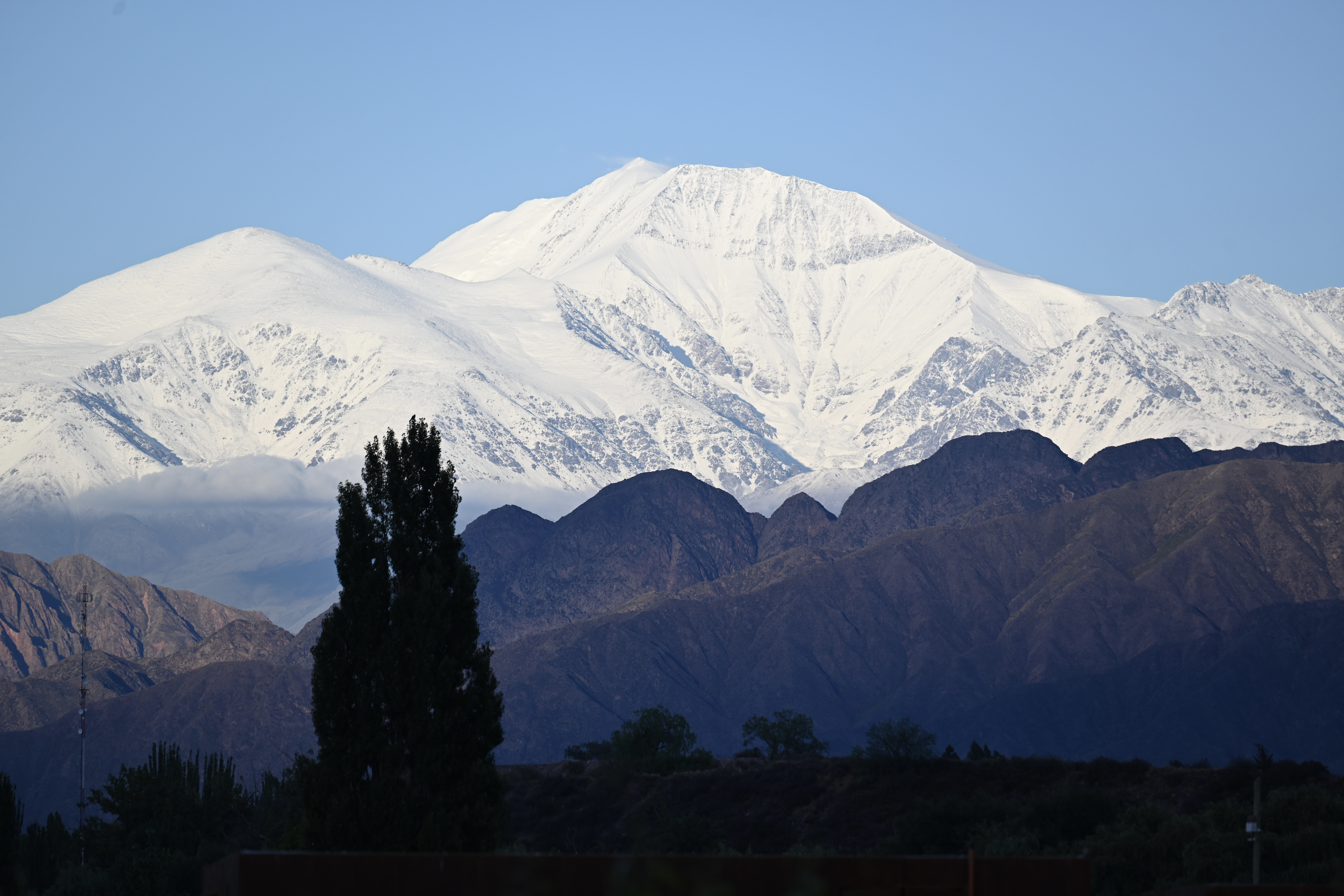
- East aspect

Highest point
- Elevation: 5,968 m (19,580 ft)
- Prominence: 1,433 m (4,701 ft)
- Parent peak: Tupungato (6,570 m)
- Isolation: 46.49 km (28.89 mi)
- Coordinates: 33°00′57″S 69°27′18″W

Geography
- Location within Argentina
- Country: Argentina
- Province: Mendoza
- Parent range: Cordón del Plata; Frontal Cordillera; Andes

Climbing
- First ascent: 1925

Cerro El Plata is a 5,968 metres (19,580 ft) mountain summit in Argentina.

== Description ==
Cerro El Plata is the highest peak of the Cordón del Plata which is a subrange of the Andes. The mountain is located 65 kilometres (40 miles) southeast of Aconcagua and 60 kilometres (37 miles) west of the provincial capital, the city of Mendoza. Precipitation runoff from the mountains drains into the Mendoza River watershed. Topographic relief is significant as the west slope rises 2,170 meters (7,120 feet) in four kilometers (2.5 miles). The Spanish toponym "Cerro El Plata" translates to Silver Peak. The first ascent of the summit was made by Hans Stepanek on January 21, 1925.

== Climate ==
According to the Köppen climate classification system, Cerro El Plata is located in a Tundra climate zone with cold, snowy winters, and cool summers. The months of October through February offer the most favorable weather for climbing the mountain.

== Gallery ==
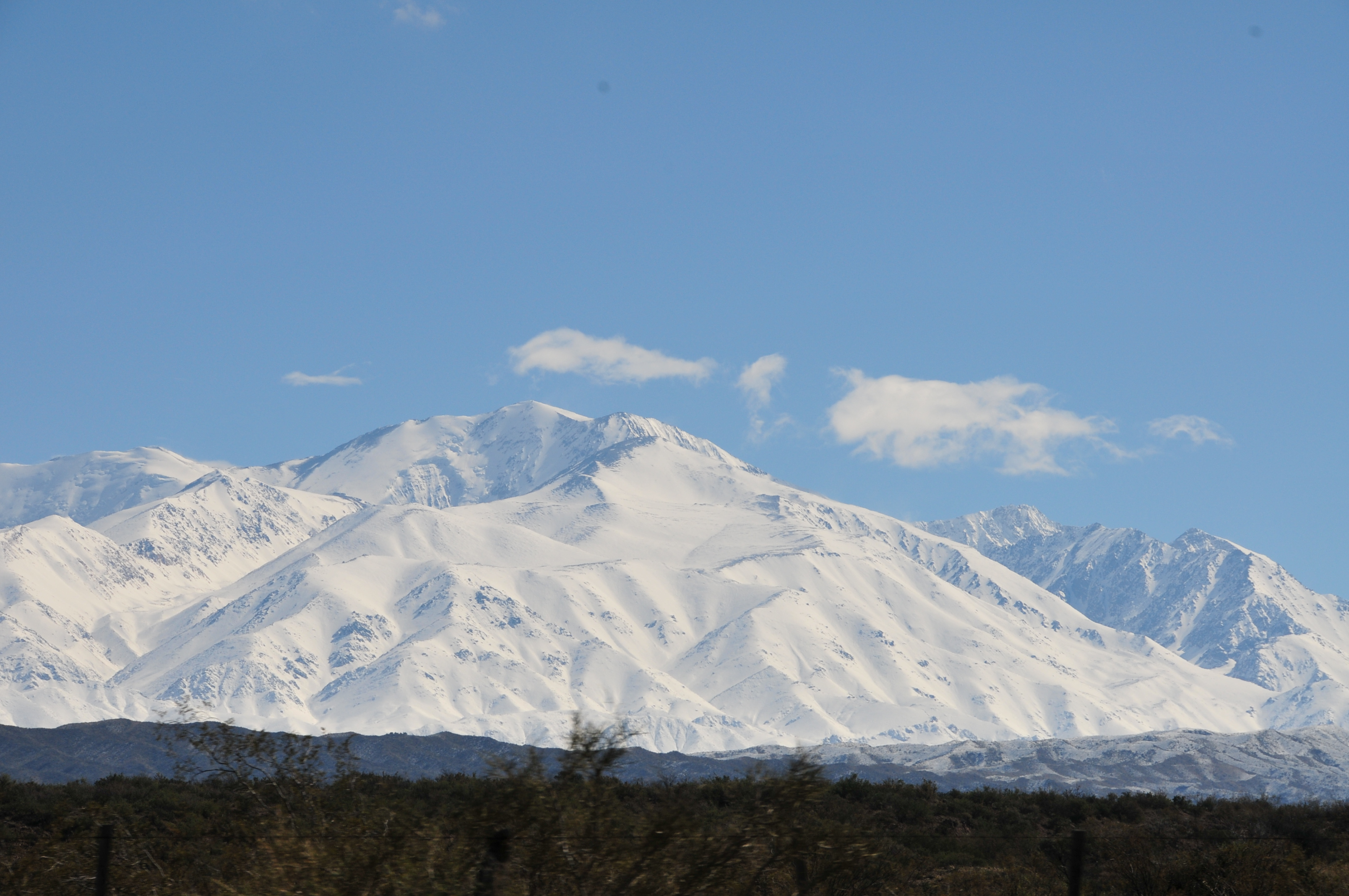
Cerro El Plata from southeast

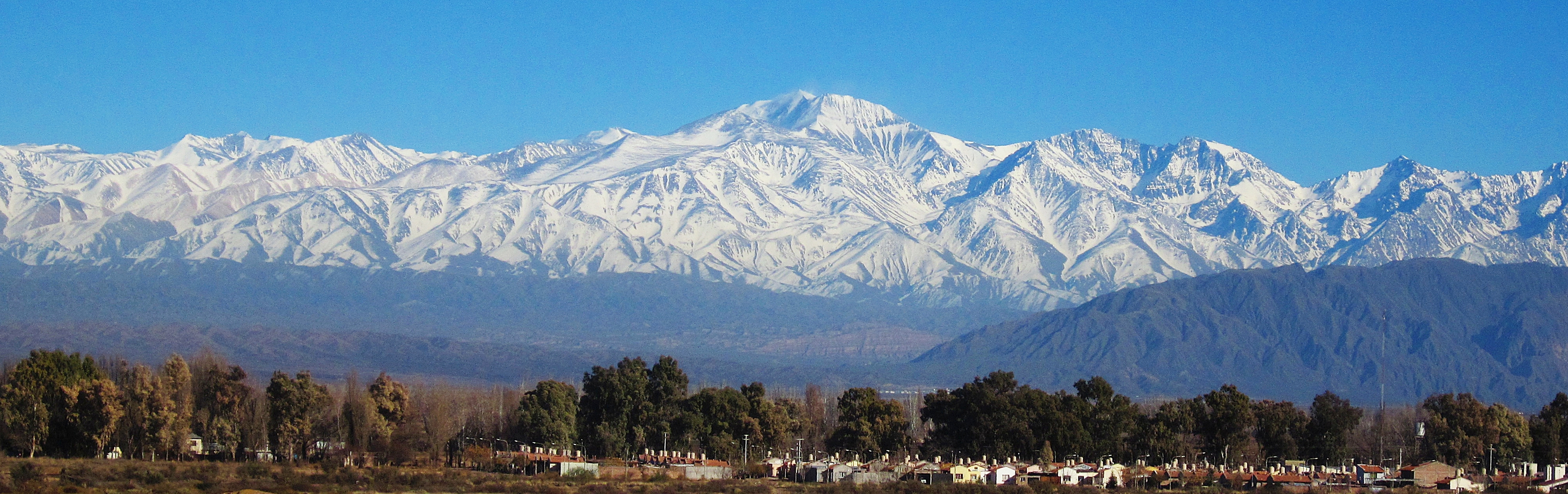
Cerro El Plata from Mendoza
