= Cerro Tenerife (Chile) =

Mountain in Chile

- Location within Chile

Highest point
- Elevation: 1,650 m (5,410 ft)
- Coordinates: 51°23′S 72°57′W

Geography
- Location: Última Esperanza Province, Chile

Cerro Tenerife is a mountain located next to the small town of Puerto Natales and Torres del Paine National Park in Chilean Patagonia.

It measures 1,650 meters and takes its name from the island of Tenerife in Spain because the Spanish settler who settled in the place, called Ernesto Casasola was from the island of Tenerife and the hill resembled the volcano Teide located in that Spanish island.

== See also ==
- Geography of Chile
