= Cerro Incahuasi =

Mountain in Chile

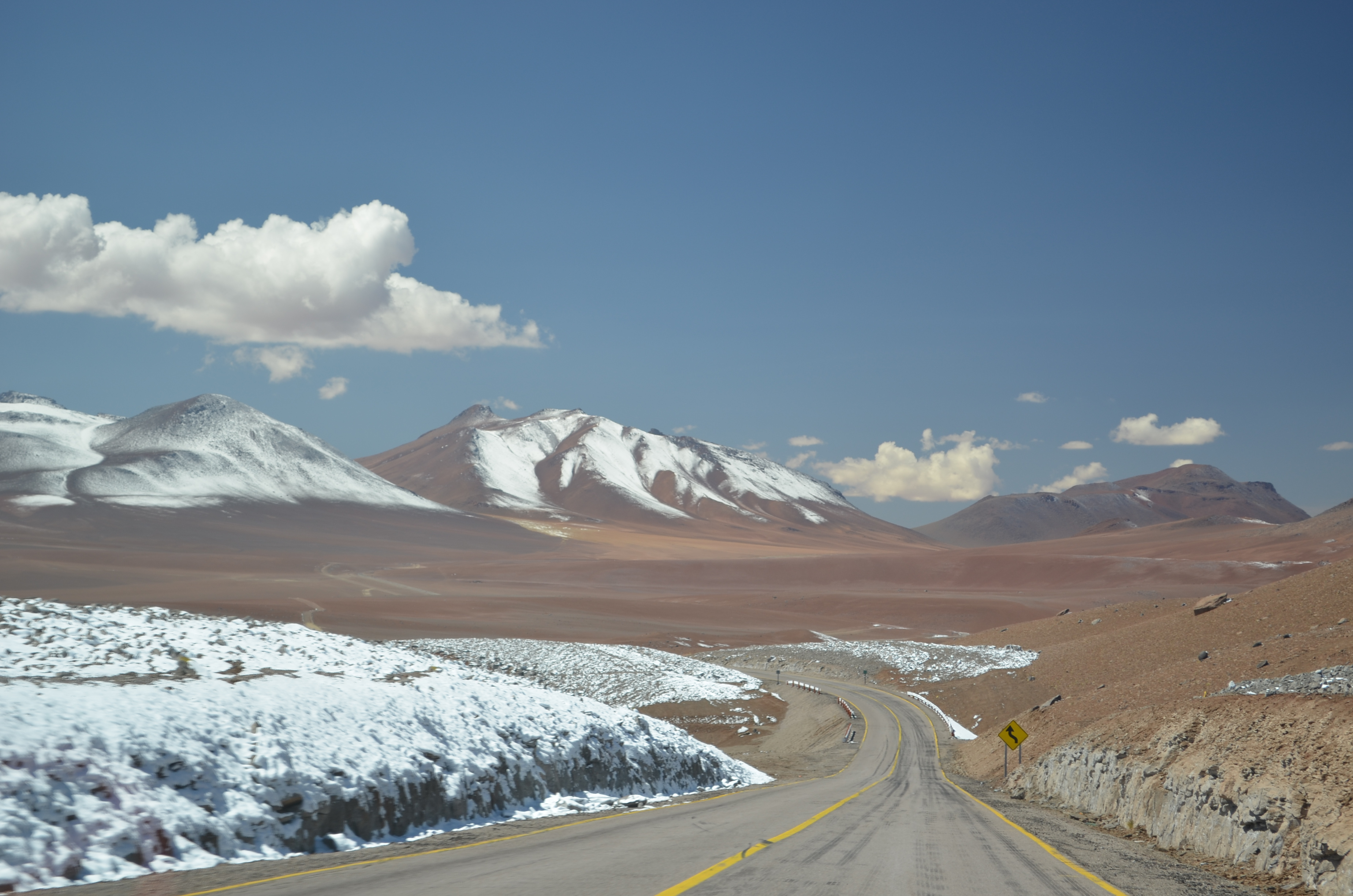
- Chile Route 27

Highest point
- Elevation: 5,305 m (17,405 ft)
- Coordinates: 23°01′S 67°34′W

Geography
- Location: Chile
- Country: Chile
- Parent range: Andes

Cerro Incahuasi, also spelled as Cerro Incaguasi, is a mountain in the Andes of Chile. It is located immediately south of Guayaques volcanic group and north of the Cerros de La Pacana, the resurgent dome of La Pacana caldera. The mountain features an exposed hydrothermal alteration zone.

== See also ==
- List of mountains in the Andes
