= Cerro de la Muerte Biological Station =

The Cerro de la Muerte Biological Station is one of the several field stations for biological research that exist in Costa Rica.

Located at 3,200 m elevation (approximately 10,500 feet) on the southeastern slope of the Cerro Bellavista (one of the highest points in the Cordillera de Talamanca), this is the biological station located at the highest elevation in Costa Rica and perhaps in all of Central America.

Mr. Federico Valverde, the owner of the station is a former herpetologist from the University of Costa Rica who decided to protect these lands and offer them to the scientific community. For this reason, the station is only open for research and academic purposes. This offers an opportunity for scientists that are interested in studying the higher oak forests ranging from 3,100 – 3,400 m (approximately 10,000-11,000 feet) as well as the páramo ecosystem above the tree line.

The mission of the station is to protect the natural beauty of the páramo, to conduct long-term research on natural systems as part of a global effort to understand and preserve the Earth's biodiversity, and to increase appreciation of this effort through innovative, field-based educational programs for student of all levels.

Lichens at the station

The dominant tree species is Quercus costarricensis, although many other trees, shrubs and vines occur in the area. A number of vertebrates and insects can also be observed at this station. Currently there is data listing mammals, amphibians, reptiles, birds, algae, myxomycetes and plants.

Researchers from all over the world visit this station every year. However, many United States' academic institutions come year after year with groups of students interested in tropical ecology. Some courses at the University of Costa Rica also offer field trips to this area.

The staff of the station take care of the visitors by providing them with the basic services offered in any other field station in the world. However, they are locally known for making their own hot sauce.
