= Cerro Platillón Natural Monument =

Mountain in Guárico, Venezuela

Cerro Platillón Natural Monument Monumento Natural Cerro Platillón
- IUCN category III (natural monument or feature)
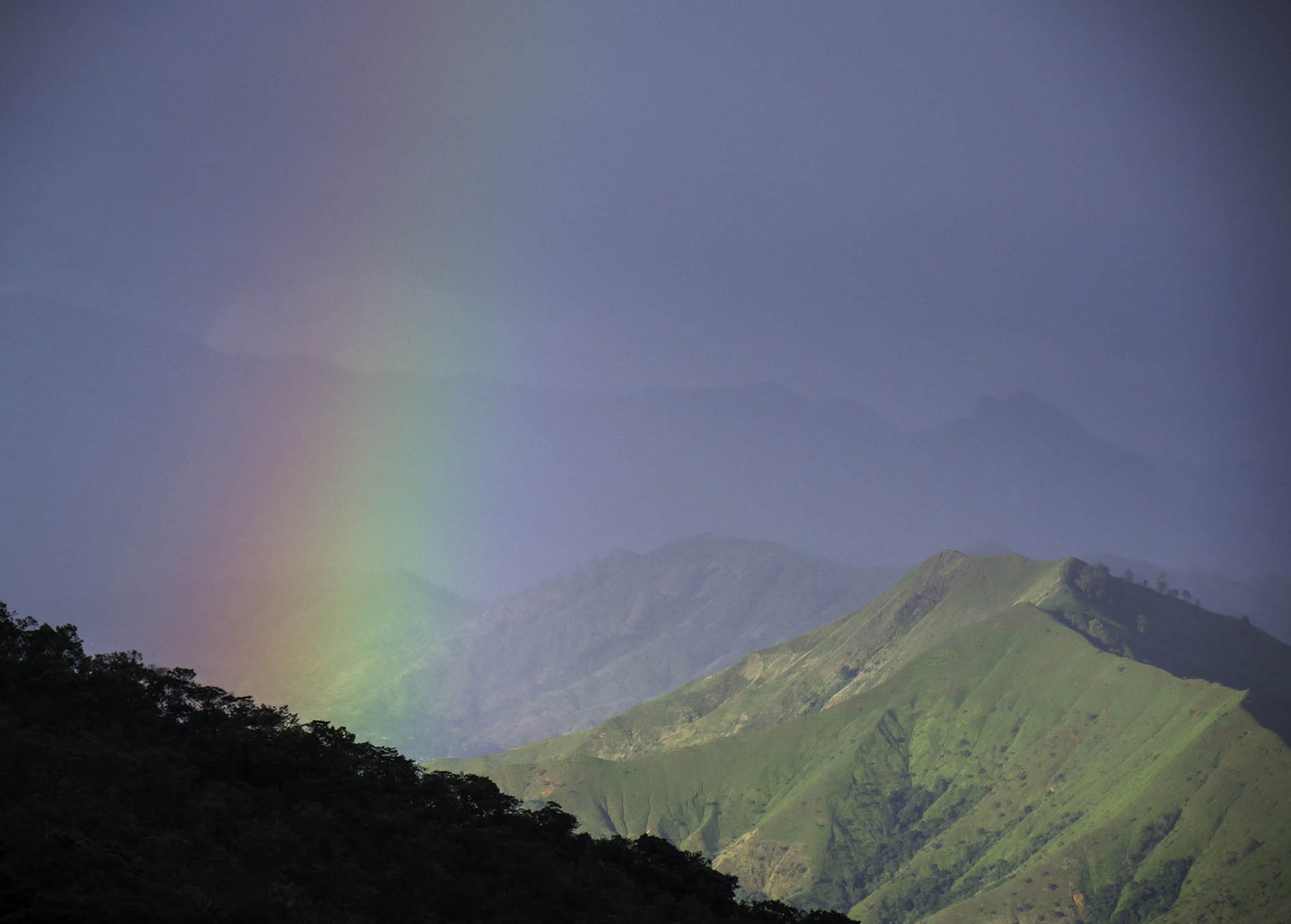

- Location within Venezuela
- Location: Venezuela
- Coordinates: 9°52′N 67°30′W
- Area: 80 km^{2} (31 sq mi)
- Established: February 4, 1987

The Cerro Platillón Natural Monument (Spanish: Monumento Natural Cerro Platillón) also Pico Platillón, is a protected area with the status of natural monument that consists of a mountain formation located in the extreme north of the Guárico state, Venezuela. At an official height of 1,930 m, Pico Platillón is the highest mountain in Guárico. It is protected as per decree published in Official Gazette of Venezuela, No. 33,664 of February 20, 1987.

Pico Platillón is located in the heart of a mountainous row of the Juan Germán Roscio Natural Monument, west of San Juan de los Morros and south of Lake Valencia. Towards the south we continue with the Topo Cruz and the row La Glorieta. Further to the east in the direction of the city of San Juan are other mountain ranges including the Paraparo Topo.

== See also ==
- List of national parks of Venezuela
- Cueva Alfredo Jahn Natural Monument
