= Cerro Picacho (Chiriquí) =

Mountain in Chiriquí Province, Panama

- Location within Panama

Highest point
- Elevation: 2,874 m (9,429 ft)
- Prominence: 560 m (1,840 ft)
- Coordinates: 8°53′41″N 82°38′15″W

Geography
- Location: Chiriquí Province, Panama
- Parent range: Cordillera Central

Cerro Picacho is a mountain located in the Cordillera Central, in the northern Chiriquí Province of Panama. It has a height of 2874 meters and is the fourth highest mountain in the country.
