= Cerro Alto (San Luis Obispo County, California) =

Coordinates: 35.4139°N 120.7343°W

Cerro Alto Peak is a mountain peak in San Luis Obispo County, California. It is 2,624 feet tall.

== Recreation ==
There are a few routes to the summit. The quickest is a 1.95 mile class-one route. There is also an unpaved service/access road that leads mostly near to the summit as it goes to a nearby peak with communications antennas on it.

Mountain biking is common in the area and there are many trails on the mountain.

== History ==
The name "Cerro Alto" means "high hill" in Spanish. The US Forest Service maintained a fire lookout tower on top of the peak until 1973.

The Cerro Alto summit gives you a view of all of the nine volcanic plugs in the region, called the Nine Sisters.

== Campground ==
A campground is near the mountain of Cerro Alto.
