= Cerreto =

Cerreto may refer to:

== Places ==
=== Croatia ===
- Cerovlje (It.: Cerreto): municipality of the Istria County

=== Italy ===
Municipalities (comuni)

- Abbadia Cerreto, Province of Lodi
  - Cerreto Abbey
- Cerreto Castello, in the Province of Biella
- Cerreto d'Asti, in the Province of Asti
- Cerreto d'Esi, in the Province of Ancona
- Cerreto di Spoleto, in the Province of Perugia
- Cerreto Grue, in the Province of Alessandria
- Cerreto Guidi, in the Province of Florence
- Cerreto Langhe, in the Province of Cuneo
- Cerreto Laziale, in the Province of Rome
- Cerreto Sannita, in the Province of Benevento

Civil parishes (frazioni)

- Borgo Cerreto, in the municipality of Cerreto di Spoleto (PG)
- Borgo Cerreto (Torre Orsaia), in the municipality of Torre Orsaia (SA)
- Castel Cerreto, in the municipality of Treviglio (BG)
- Cerreto (Bettona), in the municipality of Bettona (PG)
- Cerreto, Sorano, in the municipality of Sorano (GR)
- Cerreto (Rofrano), in the municipality of Rofrano (SA)
- Cerreto (Vallerotonda), in the municipality of Vallerotonda (FR)
- Cerreto Alpi, a former frazione of Ventasso (RE)
- Cerreto Laghi, in the municipality of Ventasso (RE)
- Cerreto Selva, in the municipality of Sovicille (SI)

Other

- Cerreto, a former name for the forest now known as Bosco Nordio

== Personalities ==
- Scipione Cerreto (1551–1633), Italian composer

== See also ==
- Cerrito (disambiguation)
