= Casa de Piedra =

Casa de Piedra may refer to:

- Casa de Piedra, La Paz, Catamarca, Argentina
- Casa de Piedra, Santa María, Catamarca, Argentina
- Casa de Piedra, La Pampa, Argentina
- Casa de Piedra (Aguadilla, Puerto Rico), a historical building
- The Thacher School, nicknamed Casa de Piedra, in Ojai, California, United States
