= Abbatini =

Abbatini is an Italian surname. Notable people with the surname include:

- Antonio Maria Abbatini (1595 or 1609 or 1610 – after 1677 or 1679), Italian composer
- Bruno Abbatini (1938–2017), Italian football player
- Guido Ubaldo Abbatini (1600–1656), Italian painter
