= Cerrito =

Cerrito, Cerritos, El Cerrito, or Los Cerritos may refer to:

== Places ==
=== Argentina ===
- El Cerrito, Catamarca
- Isla del Cerrito, an island in Chaco Province

=== Brazil ===
- Cerrito, Rio Grande do Sul
- São José do Cerrito, state of Santa Catarina

=== Colombia ===
- Cerrito, Santander
- El Cerrito, Valle del Cauca

=== Mexico ===
- Cerritos, San Luis Potosí
- El Cerrito archaeological site in Querétaro.
- Los Cerritos beach, in El Pescadero, Baja California Sur

=== Panama ===
- Los Cerritos, Panama

=== Paraguay ===
- Cerrito, Paraguay, a city in the Ñeembucú Department

=== United States ===
- Cerritos, California, a city in Los Angeles County
- Cerrito Creek, California
- El Cerrito, California, a city in Contra Costa County
- El Cerrito, Riverside County, California
- El Cerrito, San Diego, California
- Los Cerritos, Long Beach, California
- Los Cerritos, Colorado
- El Cerrito, New Mexico

=== Uruguay ===
- Cerrito, Montevideo

== People ==
=== Surname Cerrito ===
- Doug Cerrito (born 1969), American musician
- Fanny Cerrito (1817–1909), Italian dancer and choreographer

=== Surname Cerritos ===
- Alexis Cerritos (born 2000), Salvadoran footballer
- Ronald Cerritos (born 1975), Salvadoran footballer

== Schools ==
- Cerritos College, Norwalk, California, United States
- Cerritos High School, Cerritos, California, United States
- El Cerrito High School, El Cerrito, California, United States

== Other uses ==
- Battle of Cerrito, part of the Argentine War of Independence
- Club Sportivo Cerrito, a football club in Montevideo, Uruguay
- USS Cerritos - a starship in the TV series Star Trek: Lower Decks

== See also ==
- Cerreto (disambiguation)
- Cerro (disambiguation)
