= Tissino =

Corno

Location
- Country: Italy

Physical characteristics
- Mouth: Nera
  - location: Ponte
  - coordinates: 42.8072°N 12.9027°E

Basin features
- Progression: Nera→ Tiber→ Tyrrhenian Sea

The Tissino is a small watercourse of eastern Umbria in Italy. Its source is a few hundred meters south of Usigni, at an approximate altitude of 1000 m (3300 ft), and it flows for about 20 km (12 mi), almost due north, past the towns of Usigni, Poggiodomo, Roccatamburo and Mucciafora, high above the river in the massif of Mounts Coscerno and Bacugno on its west bank, then past Rocchetta and Ponte also high above it on the ridge of Monte Maggio on its east bank; And flows into the Nera at about 380 m (1250 ft) altitude, at about 1 km SW of Cerreto Borgo.

The village of Ponte overlooks the point at which the Tissino joins the Nera.
