= Caspichango =

Coordinates: 26°44′S 65°57′W

- Municipality and village
- Interactive map of Caspichango
- Country: Argentina
- Province: Catamarca Province
- Department: Santa Maria
- Time zone: UTC−3 (ART)

Caspichango is a village and municipality within the Santa Maria Department of Catamarca Province in northwestern Argentina.
