= Macchia, Cerreto di Spoleto =

Macchia
- Frazione
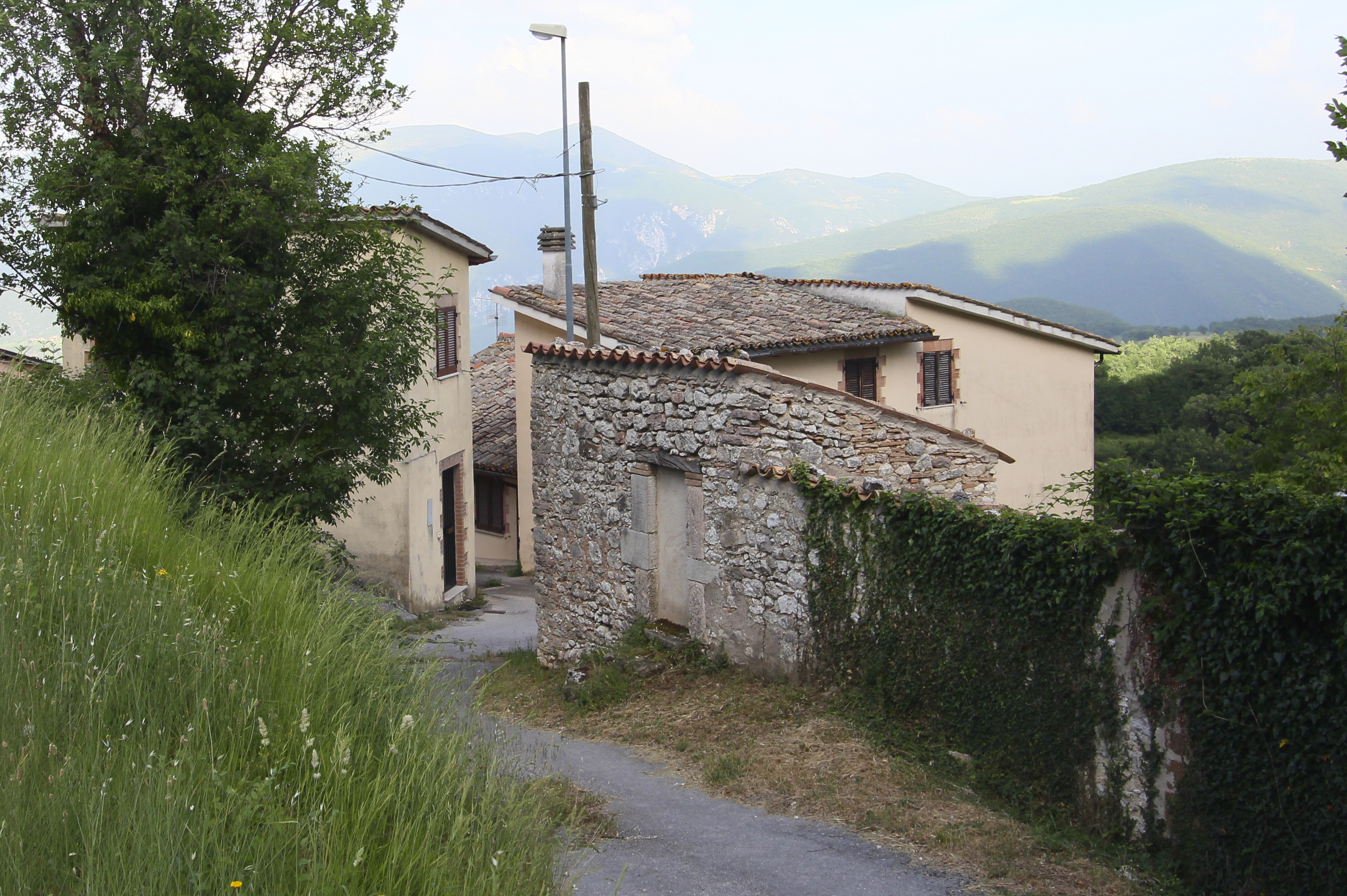
- Macchia

- Location within Italy
- Coordinates: 42°49′29″N 12°52′40″E
- Country: Italy
- Region: Umbria
- Province: Perugia
- Comune: Cerreto di Spoleto
- Elevation: 815 m (2,674 ft)

Population (2001)
  - Total: 20
- Time zone: UTC+1 (CET)
  - Summer (DST): UTC+2 (CEST)
- Postcode: 06040
- Area code: 0743

Macchia is a frazione of the comune of Cerreto di Spoleto in the Province of Perugia, Umbria, central Italy. It stands at an elevation of 815 metres above sea level. It had 20 inhabitants at the time of the Istat census of 2001.

Church of the Madonna Addolorata

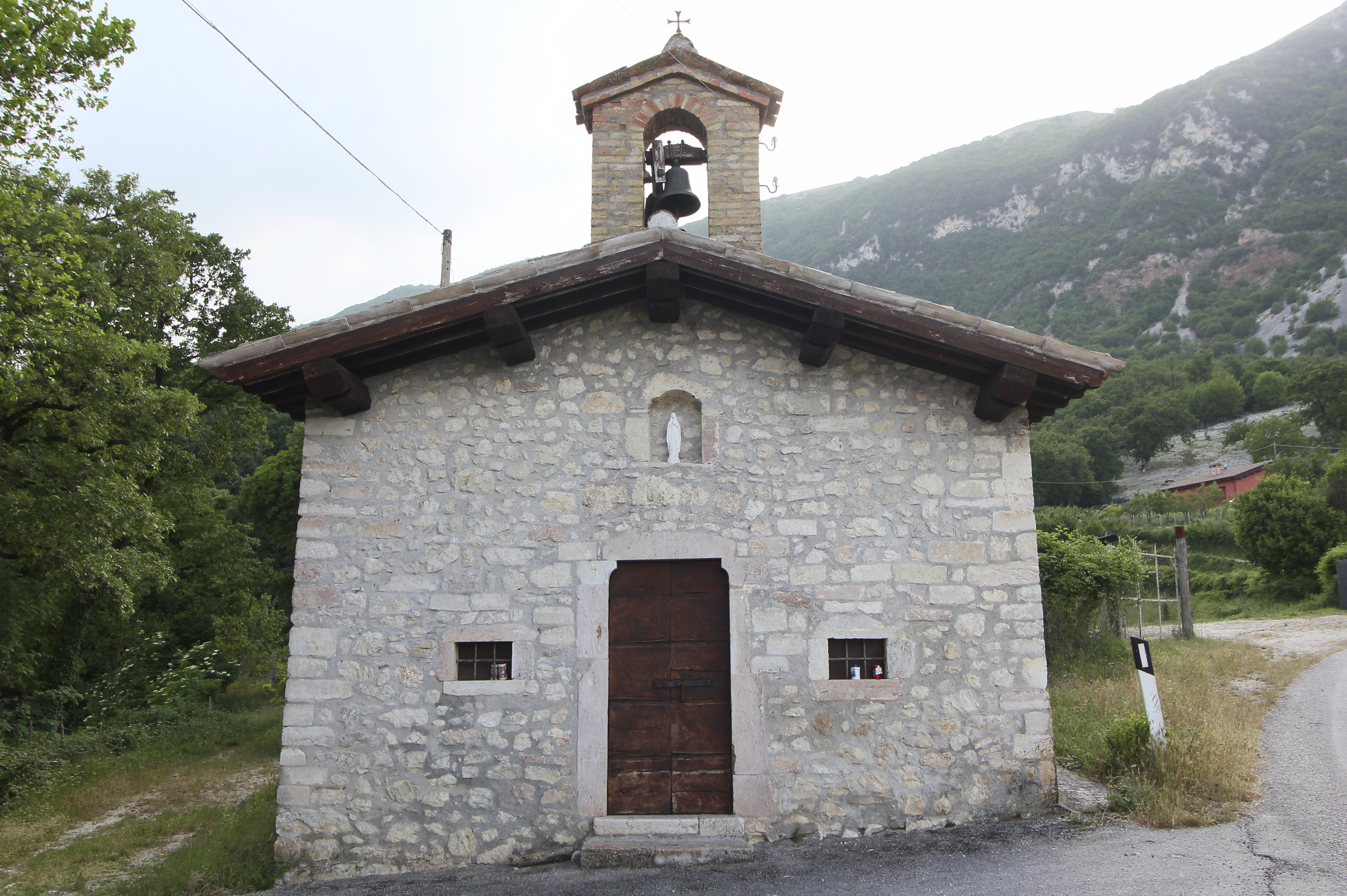

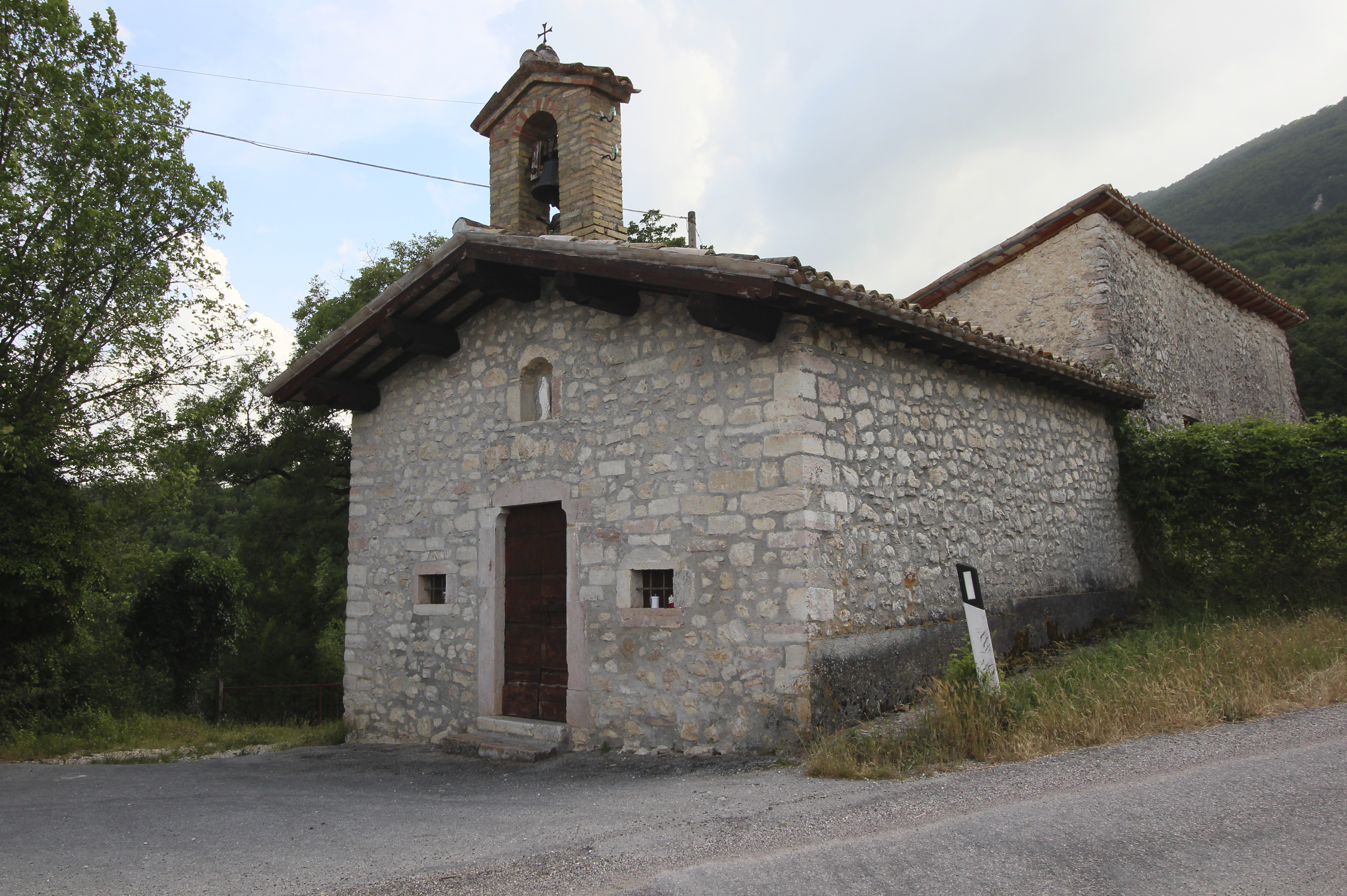
