= Rocchetta, Cerreto di Spoleto =

Rocchetta
- Frazione
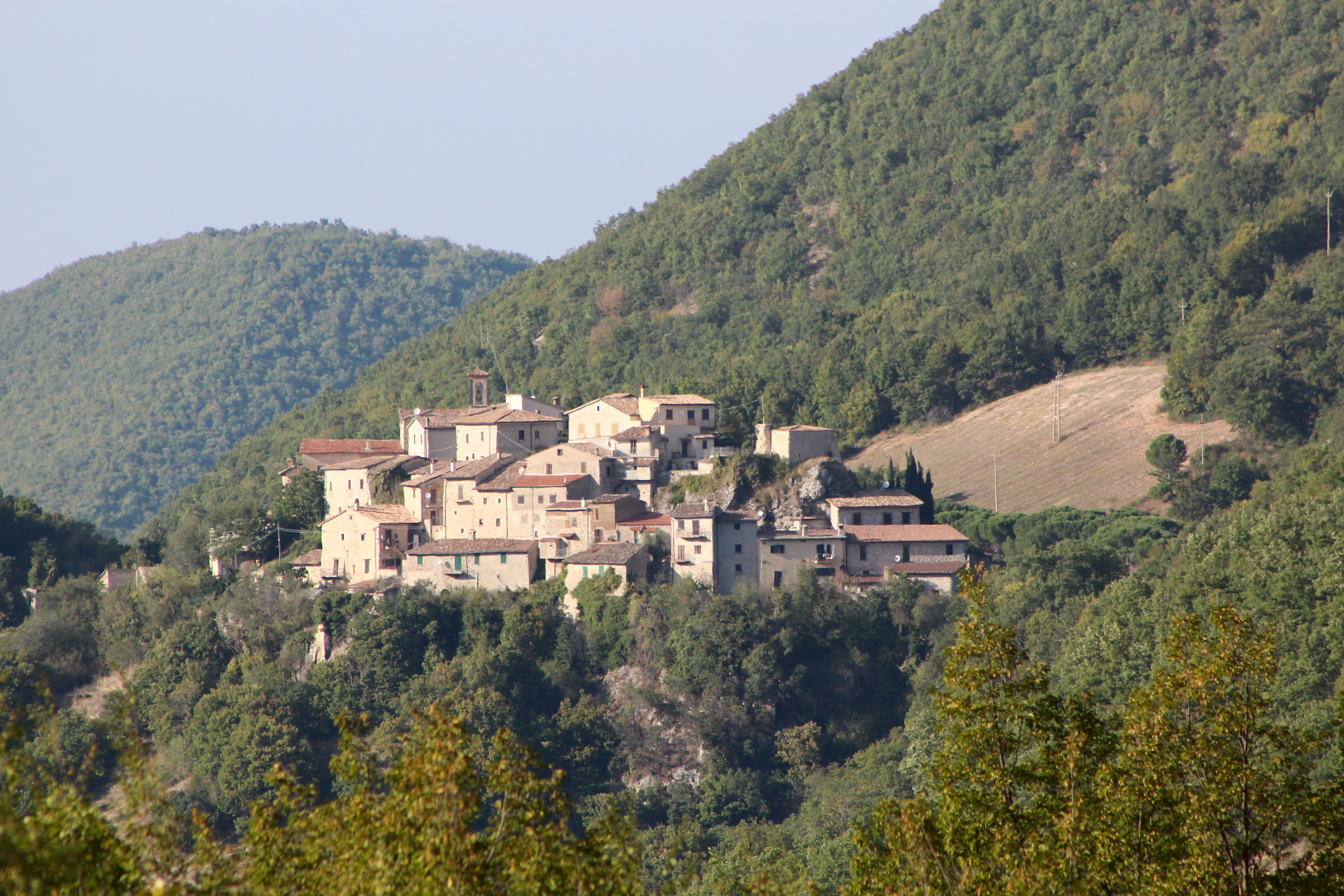
- Rocchetta

- Location within Italy
- Coordinates: 42°46′21″N 12°56′14″E
- Country: Italy
- Region: Umbria
- Province: Perugia
- Comune: Cerreto di Spoleto
- Elevation: 793 m (2,602 ft)

Population (2001)
  - Total: 41
- Time zone: UTC+1 (CET)
  - Summer (DST): UTC+2 (CEST)
- Postcode: 06040
- Area code: 0743

Rocchetta is a frazione of the comune of Cerreto di Spoleto in the Province of Perugia, Umbria, central Italy. It stands at an elevation of 793 metres above sea level. At the time of the Istat census of 2001 it had 41 inhabitants.

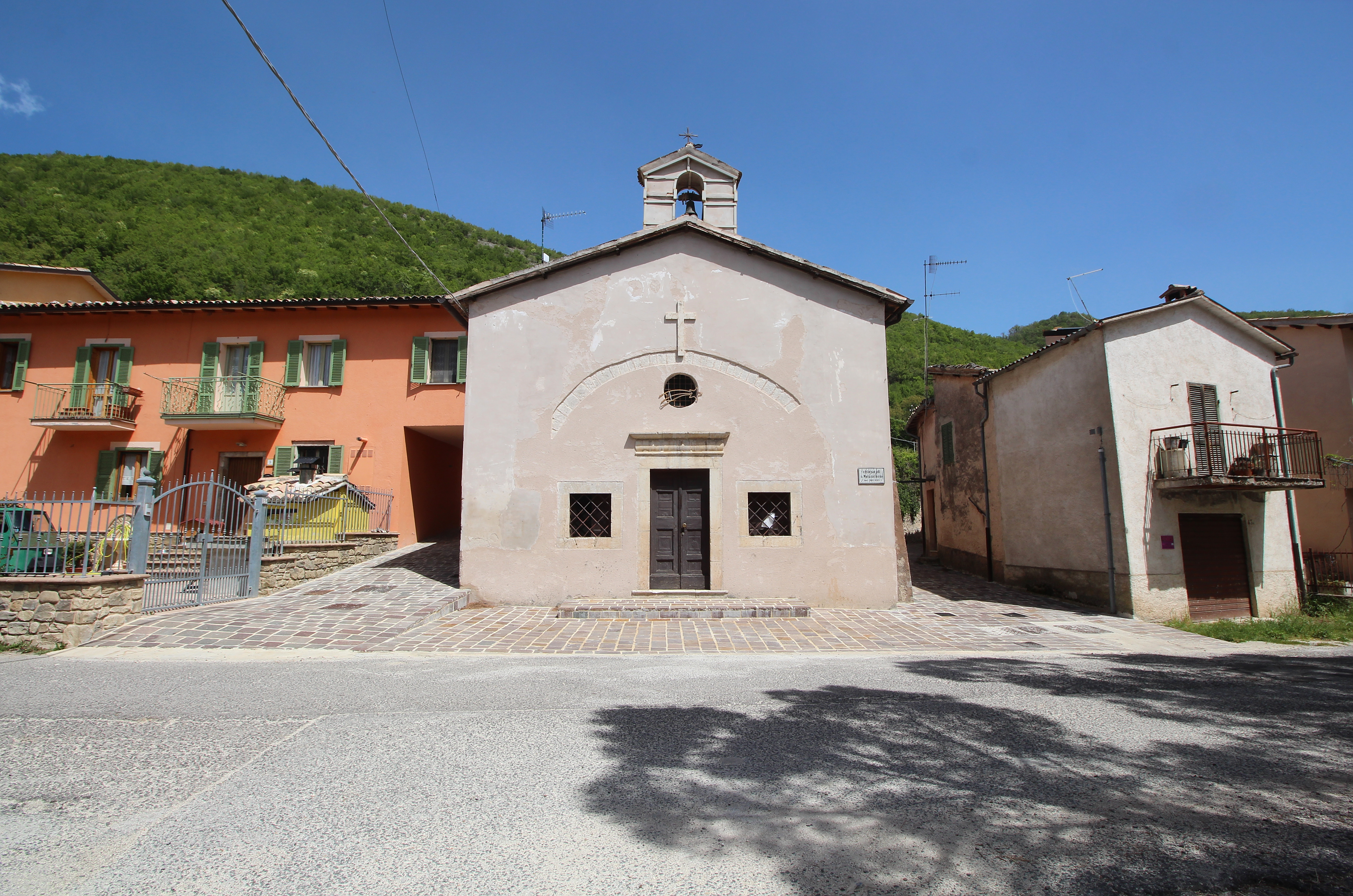
church Madonna del Verde

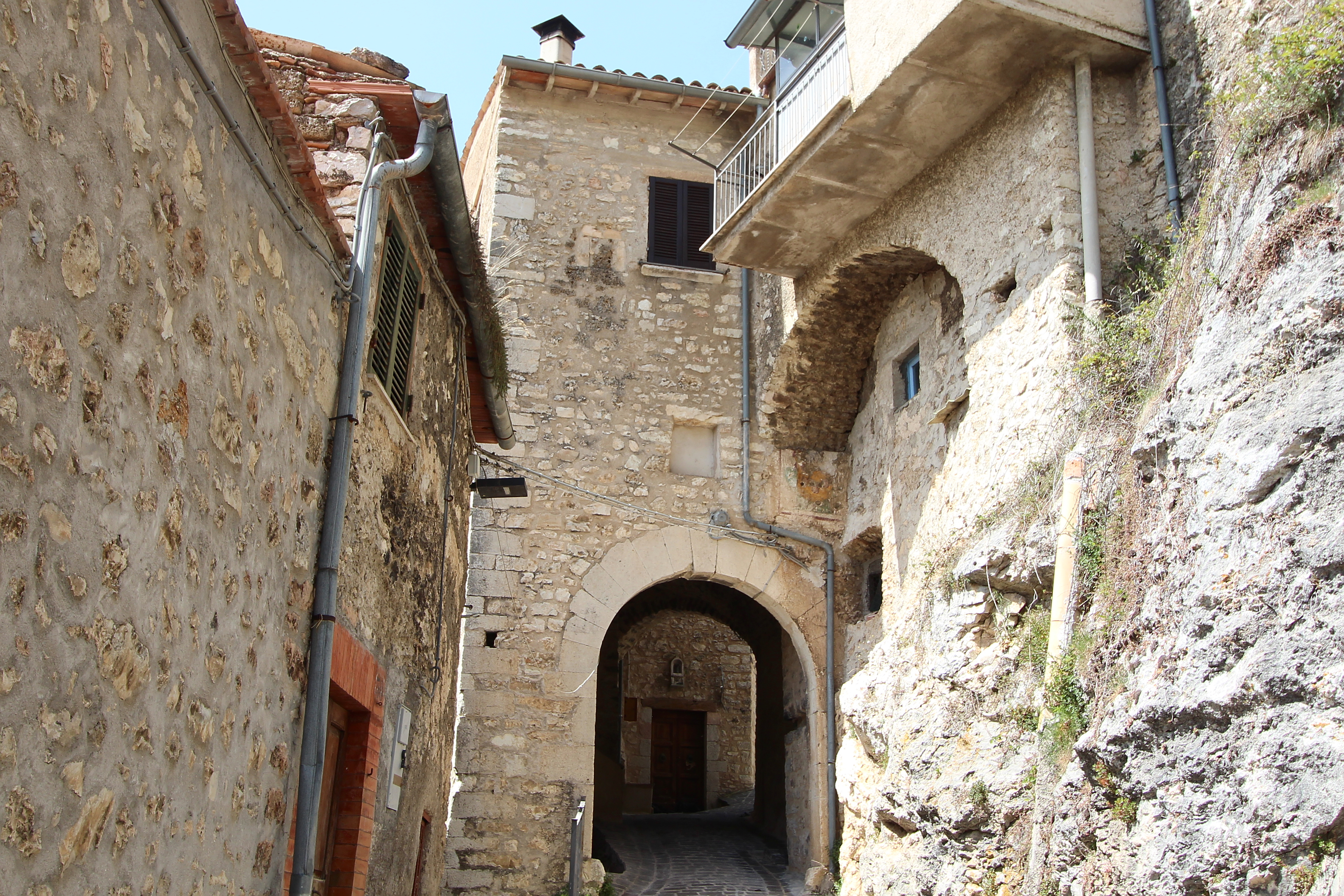
defensive gate of entrance

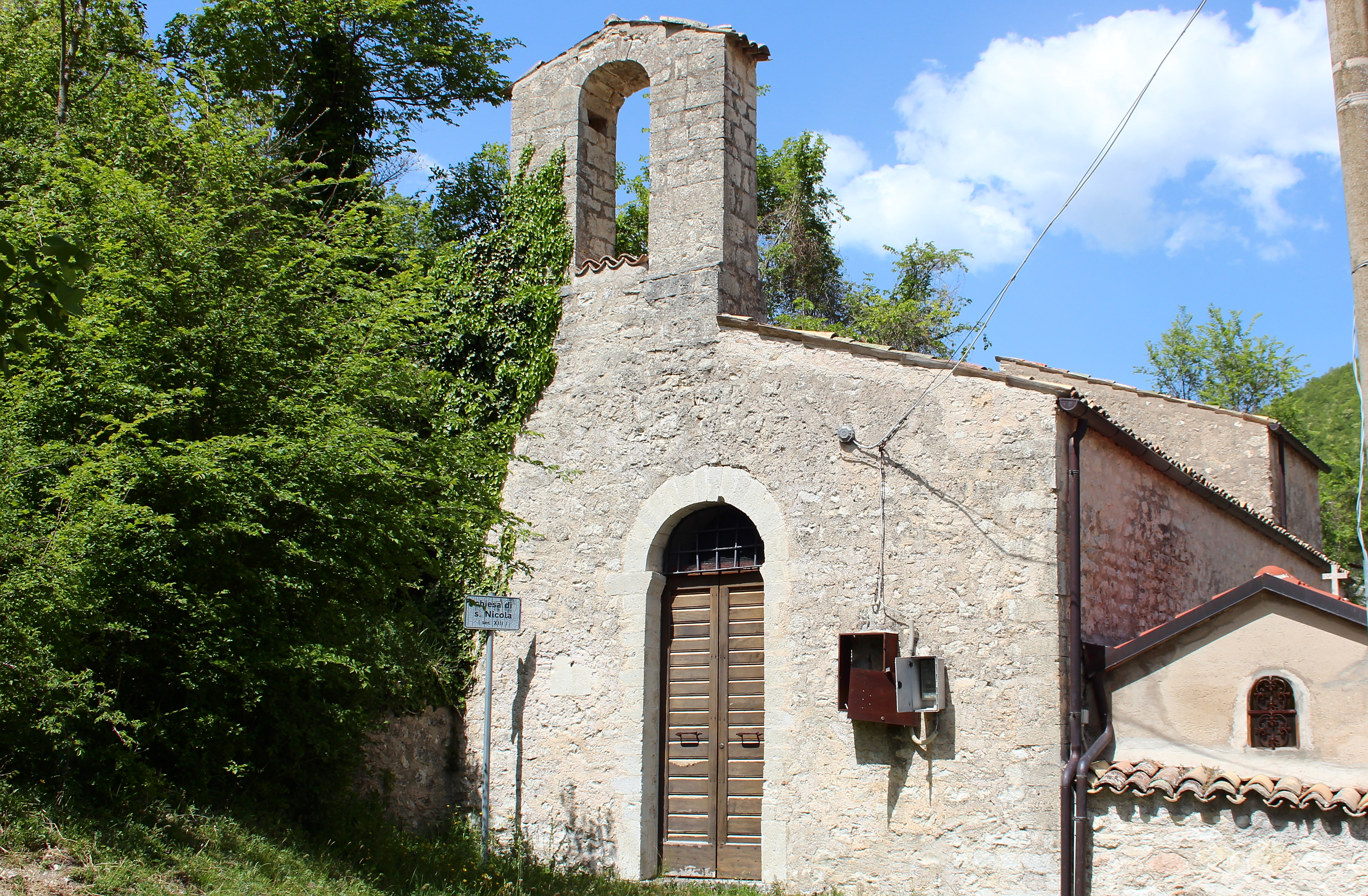
church San Nicola at the cemetery

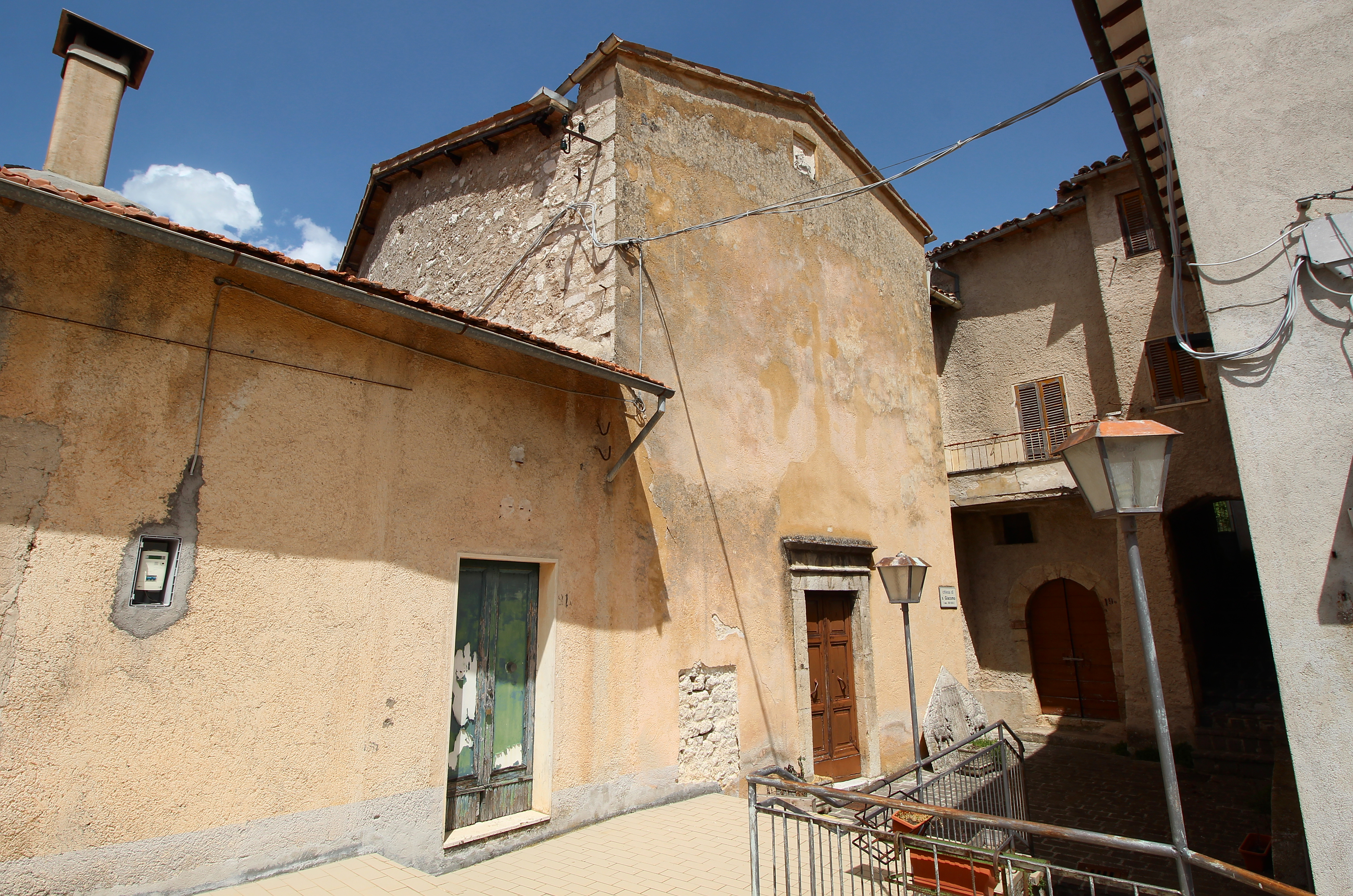
church San Giacomo in the fortified center
