= Nortosce =

- Frazione
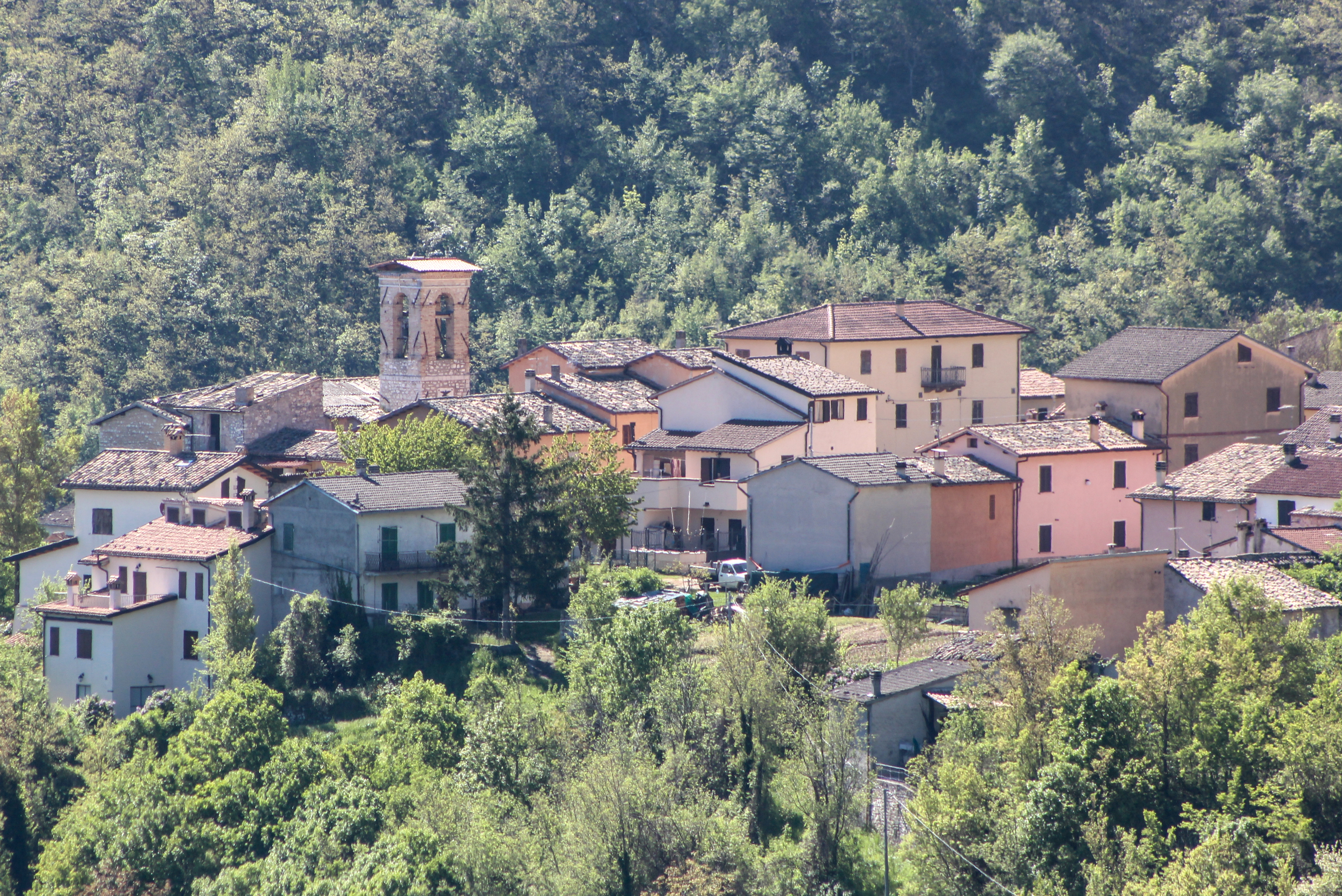
- Nortosce

- Location within Italy
- Coordinates: 42°47′18″N 12°57′06″E
- Country: Italy
- Region: Umbria
- Province: Perugia
- Comune: Cerreto di Spoleto
- Elevation: 857 m (2,812 ft)

Population (2020)
  - Total: 2
- Time zone: UTC+1 (CET)
  - Summer (DST): UTC+2 (CEST)
- Postcode: 06040
- Area code: 0743

Nortosce is a frazione of the comune of Cerreto di Spoleto in the Province of Perugia, Umbria, central Italy. It stands at an elevation of 857 metres above sea level. At the time of the Istat census of 2001 it had 7 inhabitants.

In 2020, it now reports to have 2 inhabitants.
