= Guido Ubaldo Abbatini =

Italian painter

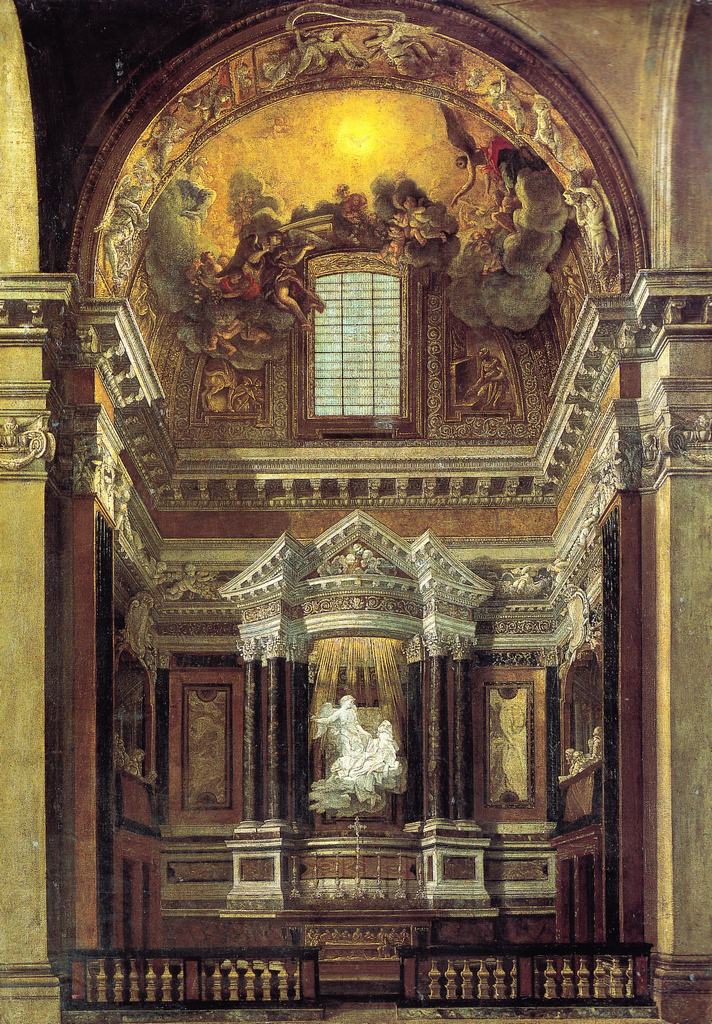
Cornaro Chapel, 1652

Guido Ubaldo Abbatini (1600 – 1656) was an Italian painter of the Baroque period, active mainly in Rome and Usigni.

== Biography ==
Guido Ubaldo Abbatini was a pupil of the painter Giuseppe Cesari and of Gian Lorenzo Bernini, and later worked under Pietro da Cortona. He frequently painted in fresco. He was born in Città di Castello and died in Rome. He also painted the ceiling of the Cornaro chapel of Santa Theresa in Santa Maria della Vittoria, Rome.
