= Fausto Poli =

Roman Catholic prelate (1581–1653)

His Eminence Fausto Poli
- Cardinal-Priest of San Crisogono; Archbishop (Personal Title) of Orvieto
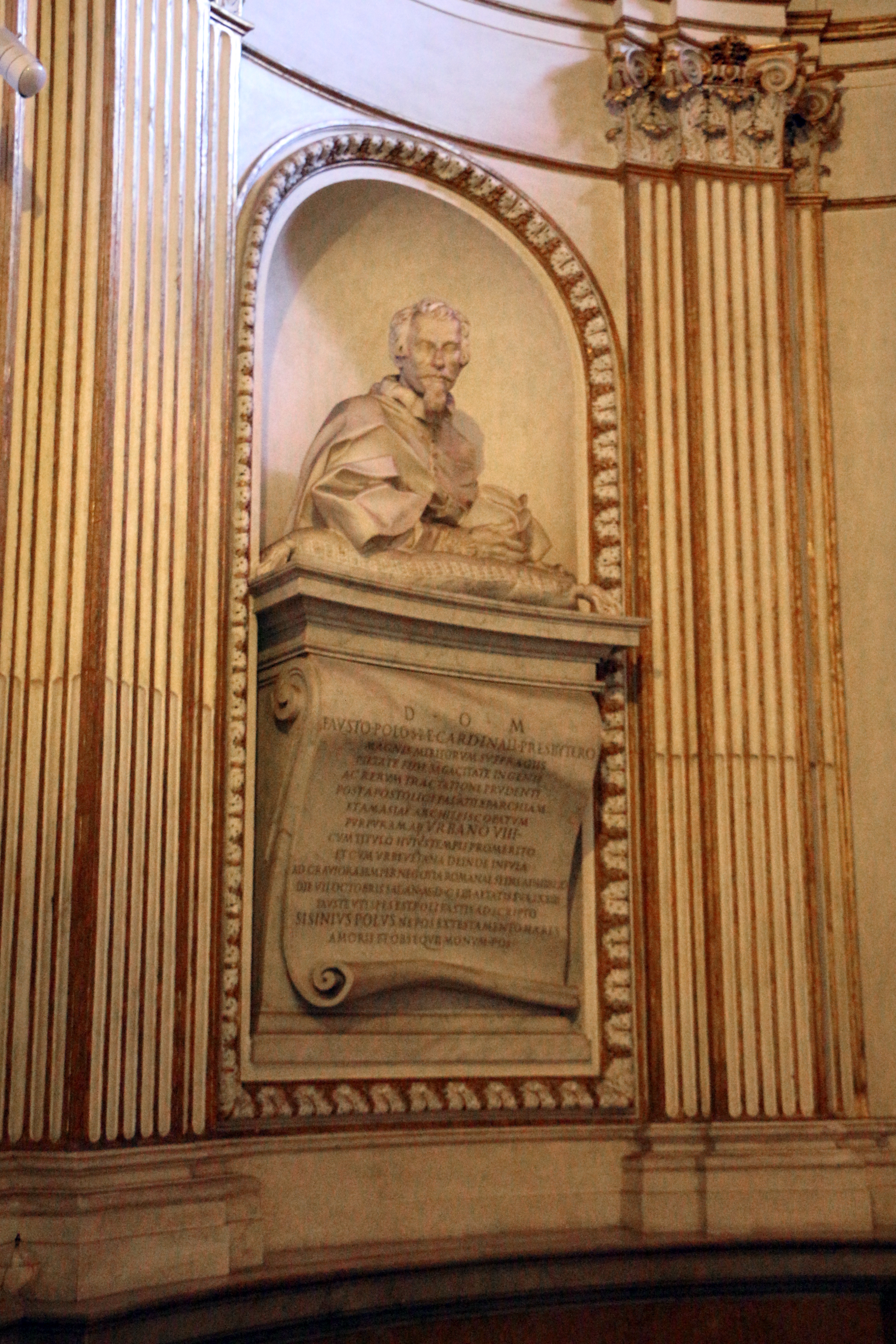
- Monument to Fauso Poli by Giuseppe Mazzuoli, San Crisogono, Rome
- Church: Catholic Church

Orders
- Consecration: 25 Jul 1633 by Antonio Marcello Barberini (seniore)

Personal details
- Born: 17 February 1581 Usigni, Italy
- Died: 7 October 1653 (age 72) Orvieto, Italy

Fausto Poli (17 February 1581 – 7 October 1653) was a Roman Catholic prelate and Cardinal.

== Biography ==
Born in Usigni in Umbria, as a young man he went to Rome and was soon noticed by Maffeo Barberini, a cleric of the Apostolic Chamber and a fellow Umbrian from nearby Spoleto, soon to become Pope under the name of Urban VIII. In 1632 he was made Majordomo and Prefect of the Lateran palace, in which posts he was responsible for supervising church and court ceremonies. On 25 Jul 1633, he was consecrated Titular Archbishop of Amasia in partibus by Antonio Marcello Barberini (seniore), Cardinal-Priest of Sant'Onofrio, with Giovanni della Robbia, Bishop of Bertinoro, and Benedetto Landi, Bishop Emeritus of Fossombrone, serving as co-consecrators. He served at Vienna as nuncio to the Infanta Maríe, sister of King Philip II of Spain and wife of Emperor Maximilian II.

As private secretary to Pope Urban, among his most valuable services was that of purchasing old works of art, or commissioning new works, for that inveterate collector; among the artists he encouraged was Claude Lorrain. In 1641 he commissioned Lorrain's Seaport with the Embarkation of Saint Ursula.

He was rewarded toward the end of Urban's pontificate by being raised to the purple as Cardinal-Priest of San Crisogono on 31 August 1643. He was appointed Bishop of Orvieto in 1644.

He participated in the Papal conclave of 1644 which elected Urban's successor, Pope Innocent X.

== Saint Rita ==
Throughout his life, he remained very devoted to his home town and region. In addition to beautifying Usigni, he was instrumental in developing iron mines in the area, and he was also so greatly devoted to Rita of Cascia (beatified by Urban in 1627), adorning her church in that town and promoting her cult, that he is often considered to have been the main force in establishing her present cult and popularity. The second edition (1652) of Girolamo de Ghetti's Breve Racconto della Vita e Miracoli della B. Rita da Cascia is dedicated to him.

== Death and burial ==
Poli died in Orvieto in 1653; he was buried according to his wishes in the Chapel of the Guardian Angel in his titular church of San Crisogono.

Catholic Church titles
Preceded by Giovanni Battista Agucchia	Titular Archbishop of Amasea; 1633–1644	Succeeded by Egidio Colonna (patriarch)
Preceded by Pietro Maria Borghese	Cardinal-Priest of San Crisogono; 1643–1653	Succeeded by Lorenzo Imperiali
Preceded by Pier Paolo Crescenzi	Archbishop (Personal Title) of Orvieto; 1644–1653	Succeeded by Giuseppe della Corgna
