= Ponte, Cerreto di Spoleto =

Ponte
- Frazione
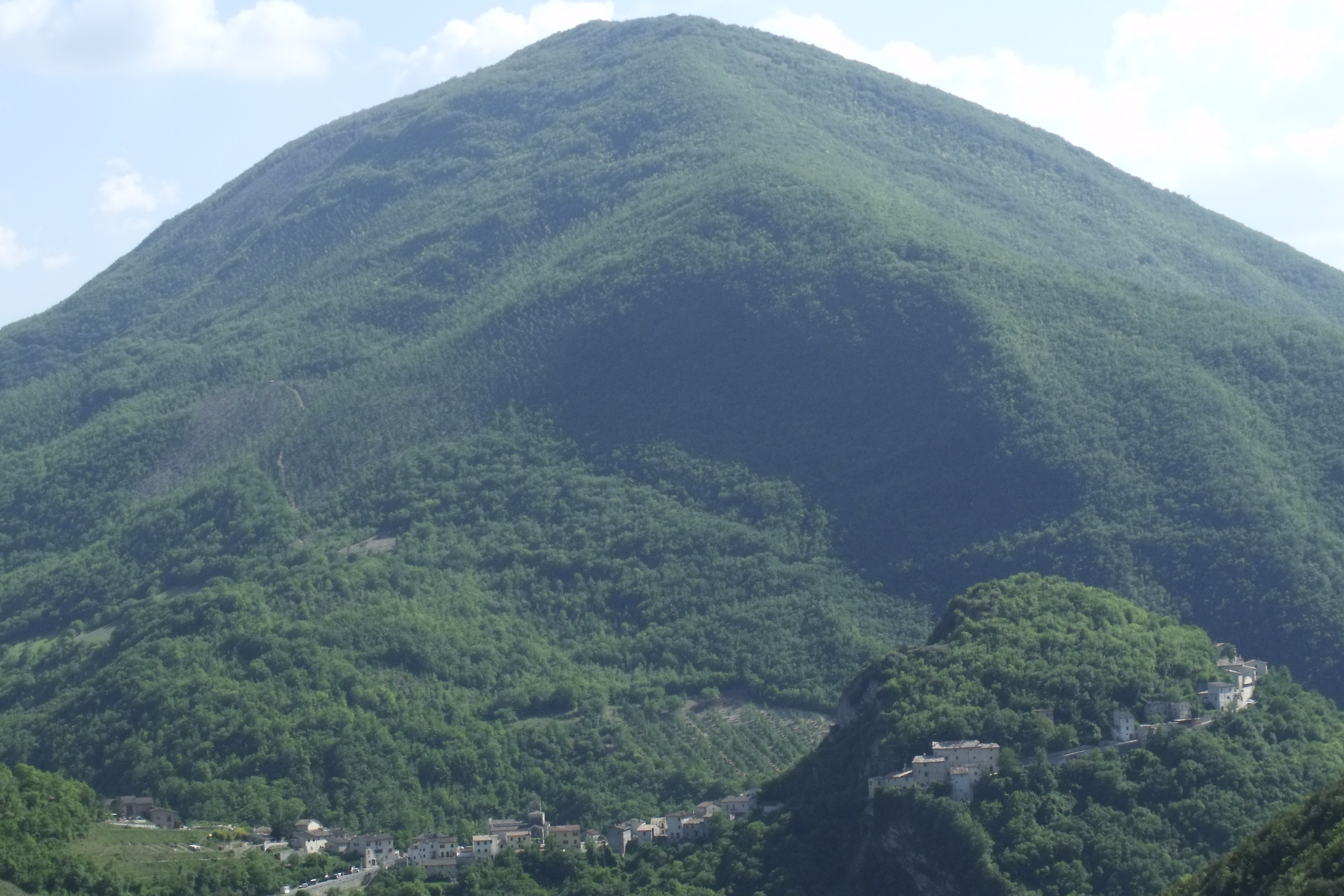
- Ponte

- Location within Italy
- Coordinates: 42°48′23″N 12°54′46″E
- Country: Italy
- Region: Umbria
- Province: Perugia
- Comune: Cerreto di Spoleto
- Elevation: 441 m (1,447 ft)

Population (2021)
  - Total: 94
- Time zone: UTC+1 (CET)
  - Summer (DST): UTC+2 (CEST)
- Postcode: 06040
- Area code: 0743

Ponte is a frazione of the municipality of Cerreto di Spoleto in the Province of Perugia, Umbria, central Italy. It stands at an elevation of 441 metres above sea level. At the time of the Istat census of 2021 it had 94 inhabitants.

== History ==
After their invasion in 570, the Lombards consolidated control over the Duchy of Spoleto. Within this framework, Ponte became the seat of the gastaldato della Montagna, an important Lombard administrative district encompassing present-day Cerreto di Spoleto, Poggiodomo, Monteleone di Spoleto, Cascia, Norcia, Preci, part of Sellano, as well as Visso and Leonessa.

The gastaldate of Ponte (identified with the medieval Castrum Pontanum) was among the largest in the duchy and extended across the upper valley of the Nera, with its jurisdiction lasting until at least the 11th century. The site of Ponte was chosen for strategic topographical reasons: it occupies a steep, isolated hill dominating the surrounding valleys and key routes connecting Norcia, Cascia, Poggiodomo, and Sellano.

Medieval documents from the 11th century attest to the extent of the gastaldate, listing numerous localities under its control, including Norcia, Campo Norcino, Pescia, Savelli, Acquapalombo, as well as Primocaso and Vespia. The same documentation also refers to a place called Ocriclum or Oricclus, identified with modern Ocricchio near Norcia.

Churches and monuments

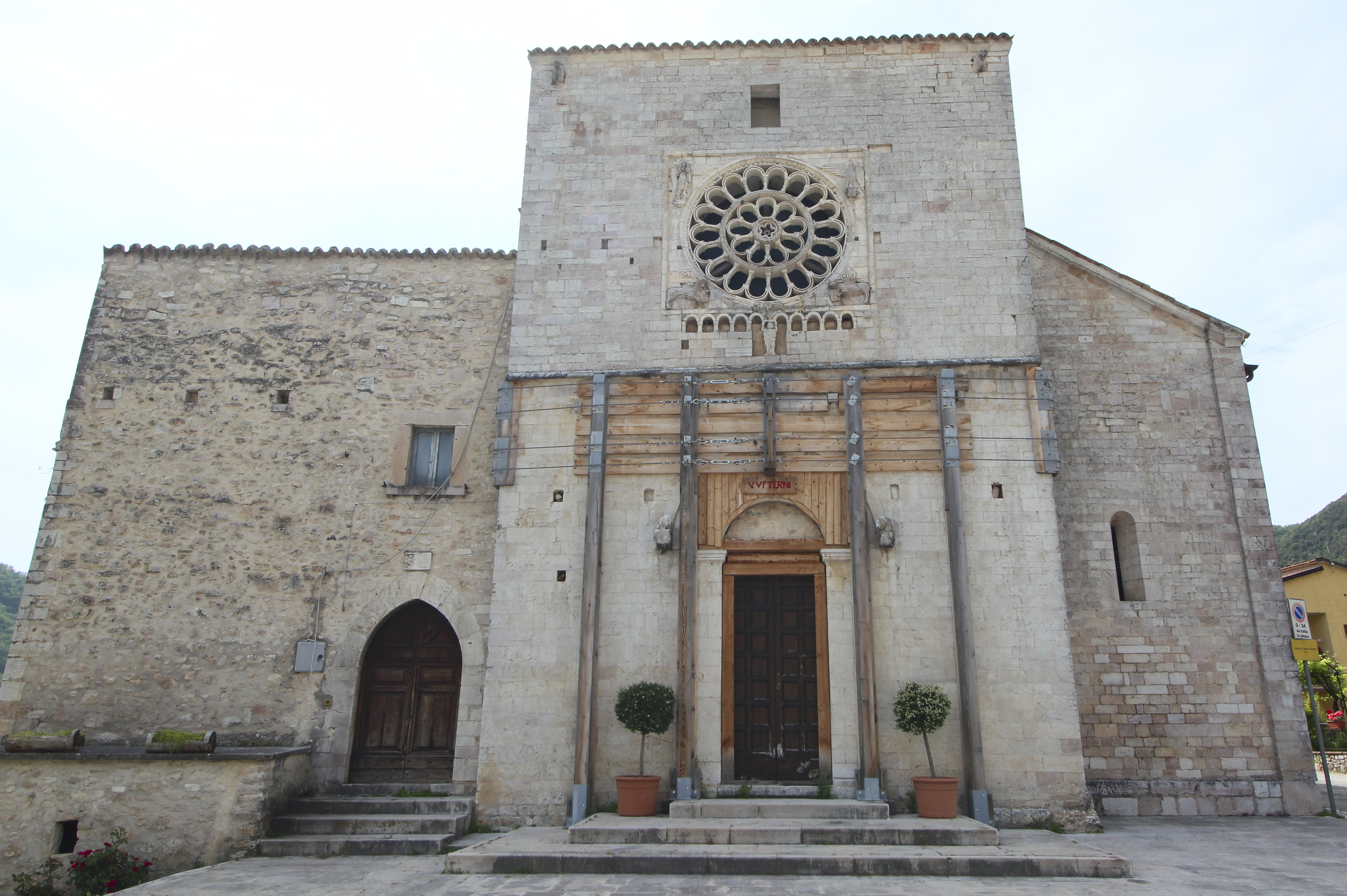
Santa Maria Assunta, facade

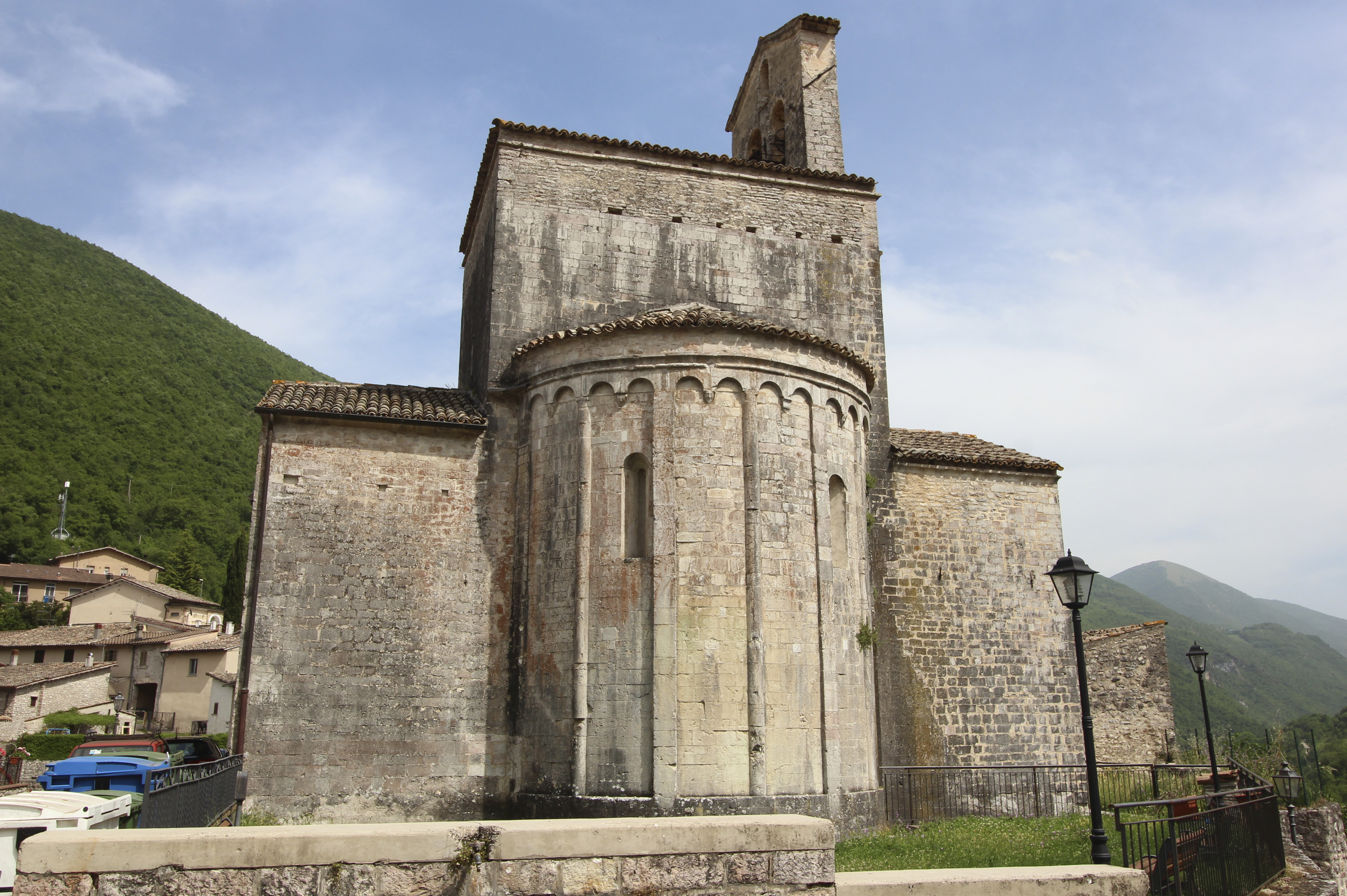
Santa Maria Assunta, apse

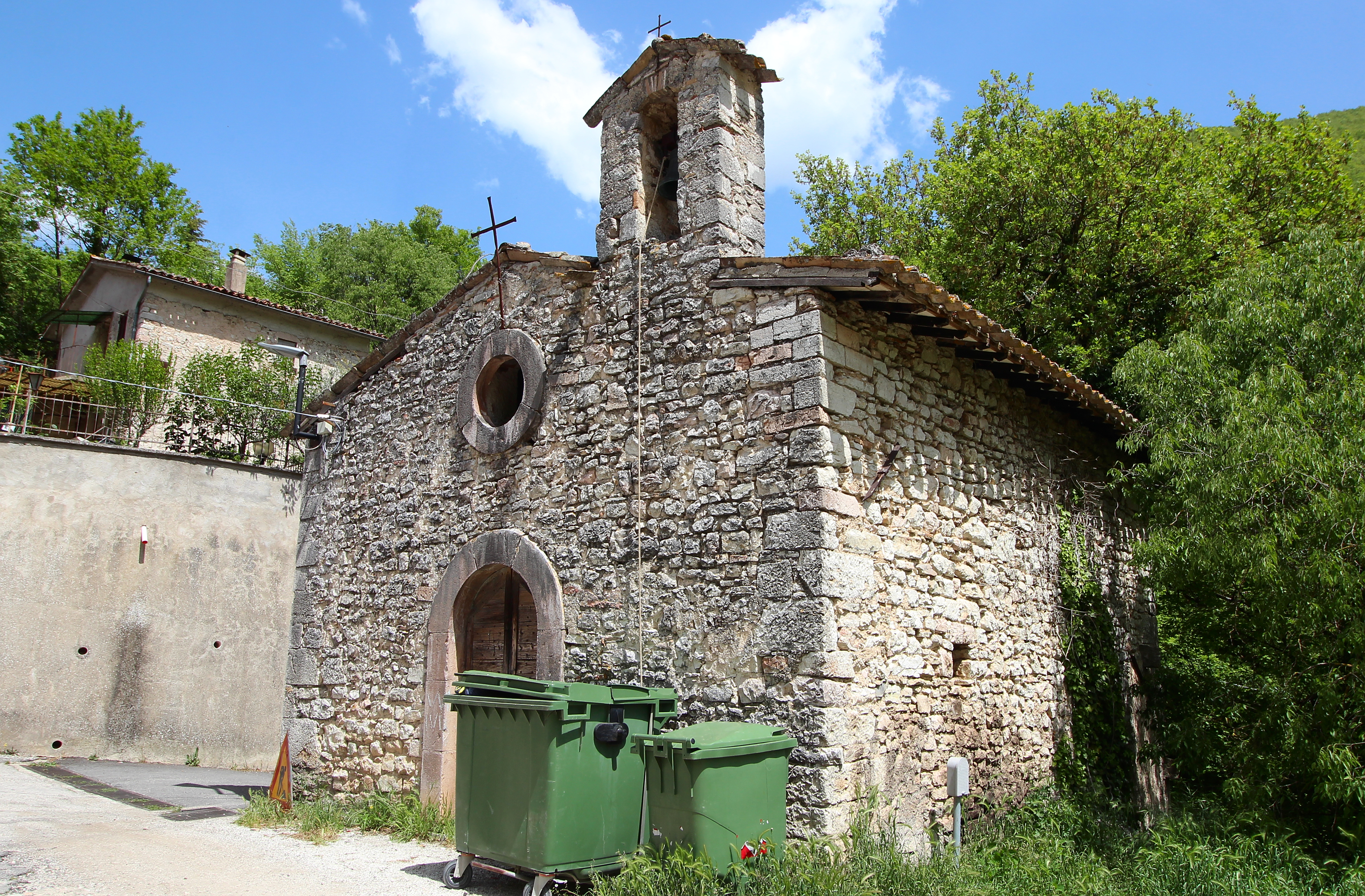
San Martino
