= Casa de Piedra, Santa María =

Coordinates: 26°47′S 66°04′W

Casa de Piedra (Santa María)
- Municipality and town
- Interactive map of Casa de Piedra (Santa María)
- Country: Argentina
- Province: Catamarca Province
- Department: Santa María
- Time zone: UTC−3 (ART)

Casa de Piedra is a town and municipality in Santa María Department of Catamarca Province in northwestern Argentina.
