= El Cerrito, Catamarca =

El Cerrito (Catamarca)
- Municipality and village
- Interactive map of El Cerrito (Catamarca)
- Coordinates: 26°41′S 66°03′W
- Country: Argentina
- Province: Catamarca Province
- Department: Santa Maria
- Time zone: UTC−3 (ART)

El Cerrito (Catamarca) is a village and municipality within the Santa Maria Department of Catamarca Province in northwestern Argentina.
