= Seaport with the Embarkation of Saint Ursula =

1641 painting by Claude Lorrain

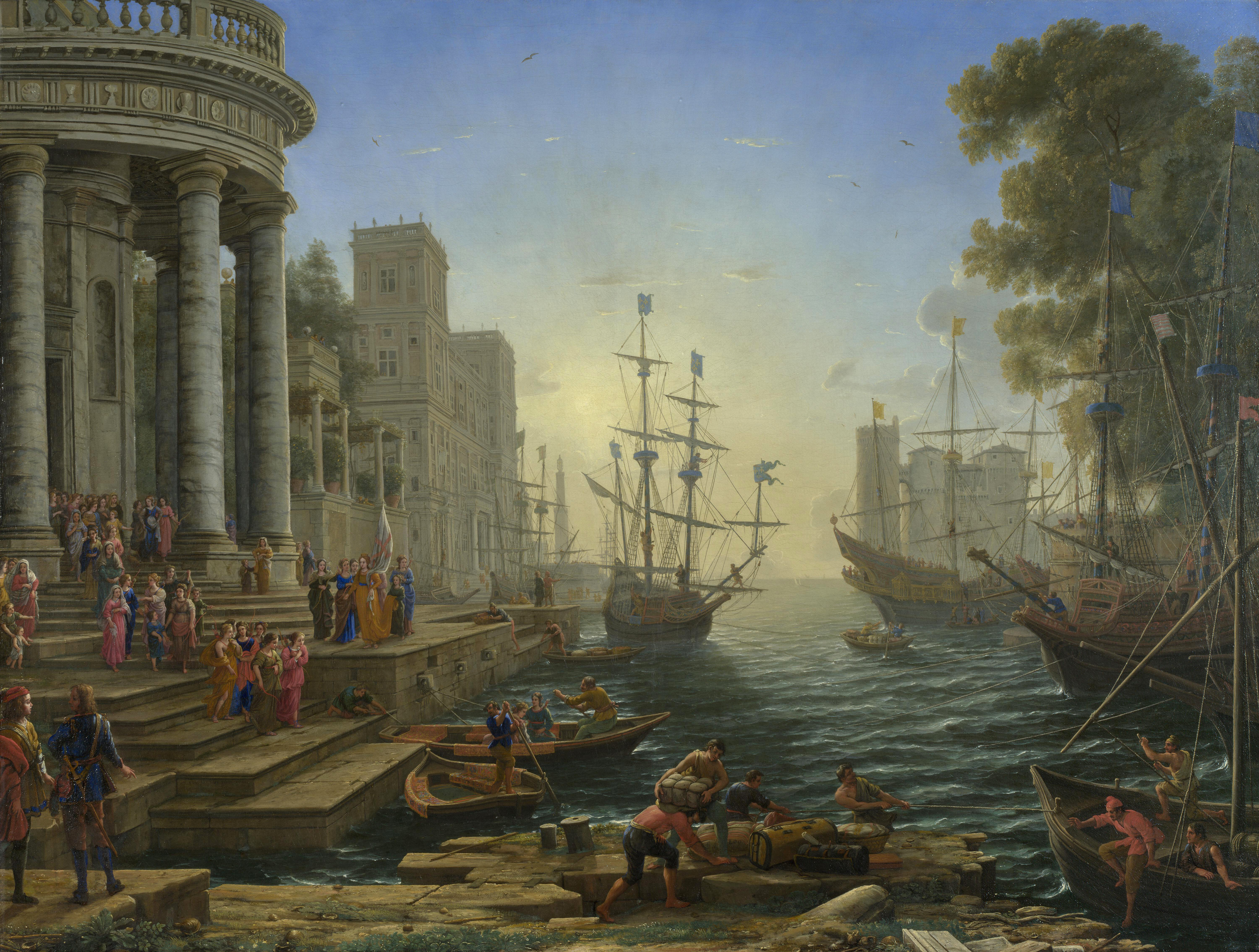
- Artist: Claude Lorrain
- Year: 1641
- Medium: Oil on canvas
- Dimensions: 113 cm × 149 cm (44 in × 59 in)
- Location: National Gallery; London

Seaport with the Embarkation of Saint Ursula is an oil painting on canvas of 1641 by Claude Lorrain, signed and dated by the artist. The work was produced for Fausto Poli, who two years later was made a cardinal by Pope Urban VIII. It is now in the National Gallery in London, which acquired it in 1824 as part of the collection of John Julius Angerstein.
