= Bugiano =

- Frazione
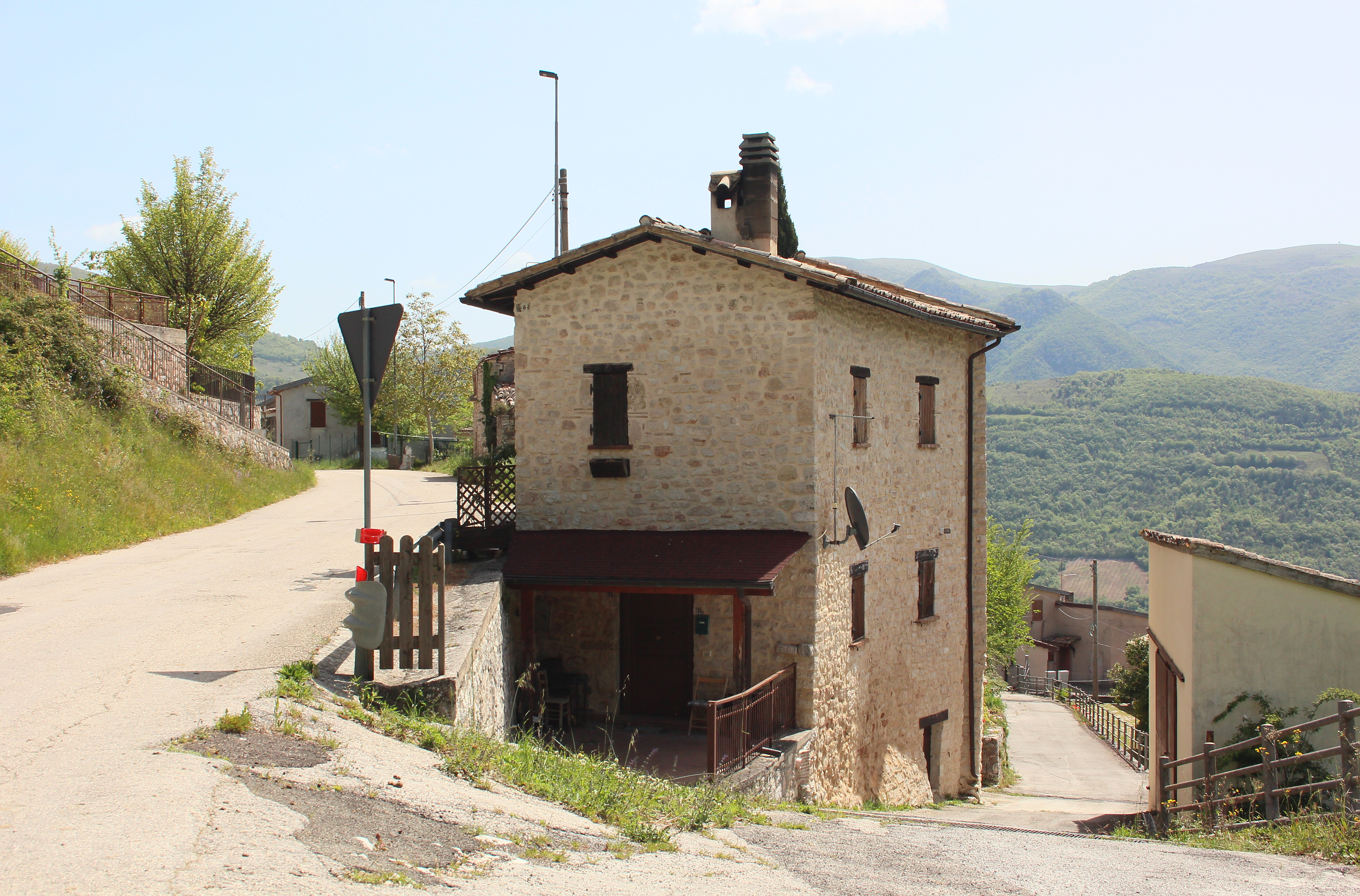
- Bugiano

- Location within Italy
- Coordinates: 42°50′56″N 12°54′38″E
- Country: Italy
- Region: Umbria
- Province: Perugia
- Comune: Cerreto di Spoleto
- Elevation: 686 m (2,251 ft)

Population (2001)
  - Total: 36
- Time zone: UTC+1 (CET)
  - Summer (DST): UTC+2 (CEST)
- Postcode: 06040
- Area code: 0743

Bugiano is a frazione of the comune of Cerreto di Spoleto in the Province of Perugia, Umbria, central Italy. It stands at an elevation of 686 metres above sea level. At the time of the Istat census of 2001 it had 36 inhabitants.
