= Casa de Piedra, La Paz =

Coordinates: 29°35′S 65°30′W

Casa de Piedra (La Paz)
- Municipality and village
- Interactive map of Casa de Piedra (La Paz)
- Country: Argentina
- Province: Catamarca Province
- Time zone: UTC−3 (ART)

Casa de Piedra (La Paz) is a village and municipality in Catamarca Province in northwestern Argentina.
