= Usigni =

- Frazione
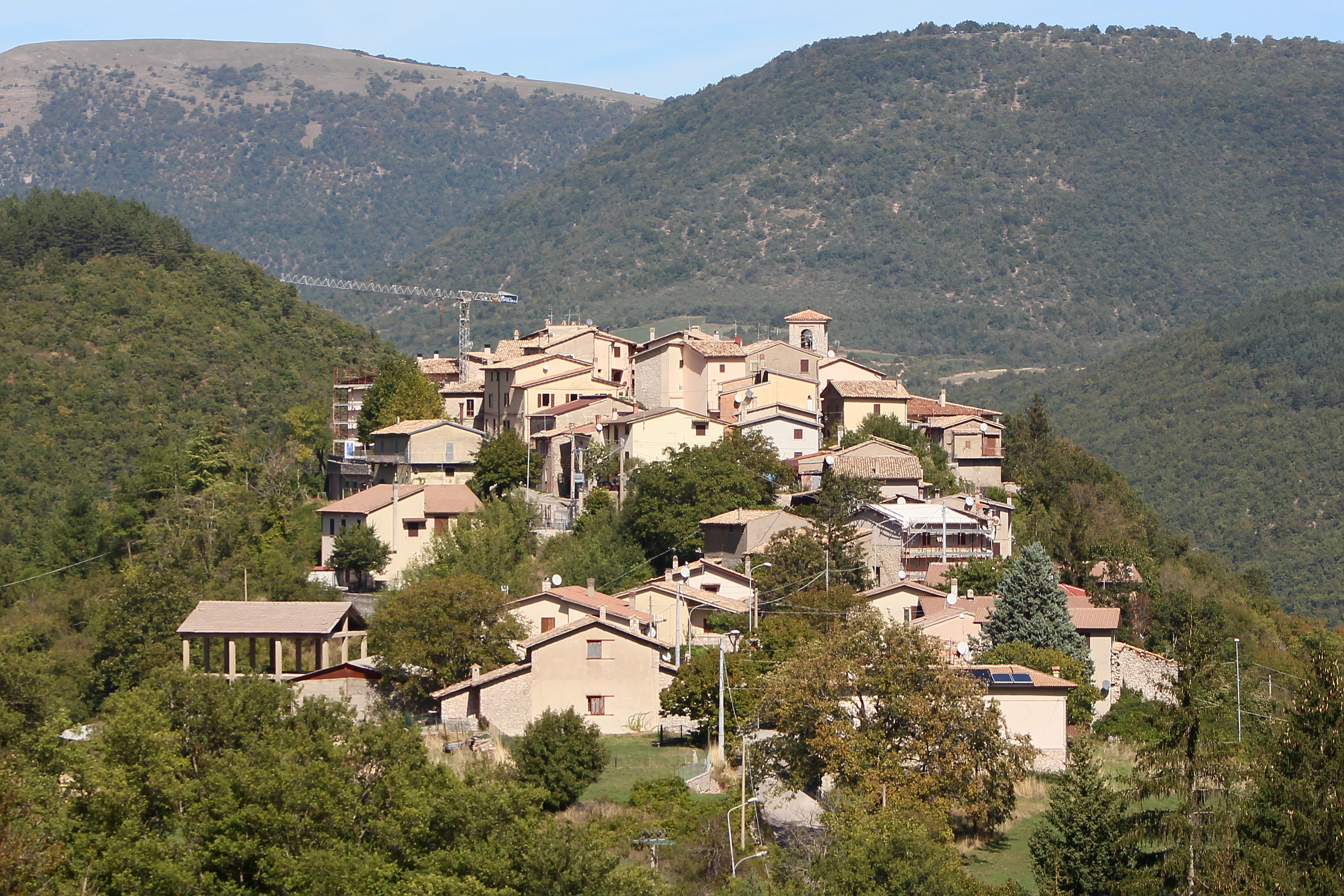
- Viewof Usigni

- Location of Usigni in Italy
- Coordinates: 42°42′N 12°56′E
- Country: Italy
- Region: Umbria
- Province: Perugia
- Comune: Poggiodomo

Area
  - Total: 0.05 km^{2} (0.019 sq mi)
- Elevation: 1,001 m (3,284 ft)

Population (2021)
  - Total: 7
  - Density: 140/km^{2} (360/sq mi)
- Time zone: UTC+1 (CET)
  - Summer (DST): UTC+2 (CEST)

Usigni is a village in Umbria, a frazione of the comune of Poggiodomo in the Province of Perugia. It lies a few hundred metres downstream from the source of the Tissino River.

The hamlet is situated at an elevation of 1,001 metres (3,284 ft) above sea level. In 2021 it had a population of 7 inhabitants. (Note: To obtain the data from the website: 1. Select "Basi Territoriali 2021: Confini amministrativi, Località, Sezioni di censimento, Aree SubCom".; 2. Use the search function to find the desired place.; 3. Click the Attribute Table icon in the top-right corner.; 4. In the panel that appears at the bottom of the page, select "Località 2021".)

== History ==
The village was formerly fortified. Though now small in size, it was the birthplace of Fausto Cardinal Poli, private secretary to Pope Urban VIII. In the 17th century Poli contributed significantly to his native village.

In 1859 Usigni had 178 inhabitants, forming 36 families in 35 houses. An annual fair was held there on 30 August.

== Religion and culture ==
=== San Salvatore ===
The Church of San Salvatore at Usigni was commissioned in 1631 by Cardinal Poli. The architectural design reflects the style of late 16th-century Roman churches and has been attributed to Gian Lorenzo Bernini.

The façade is arranged on two levels, vertically divided by four stone pilasters and horizontally articulated by cornices. The lower level features a rectangular portal with a curved pediment, while the upper section includes a central blind window and a triangular pediment bearing the coat of arms of Pope Urban VIII.

The interior consists of a single nave with lateral chapels, following Roman models. The pavement and pulpit are made of worked stone. The altarpieces of the chapels were commissioned by Fausto Poli from Salvi Castellucci.

Among the artworks are frescoes and paintings including Saint Rita of Cascia, the meeting of Saints Peter and Paul, and the Madonna of the Rosary with Saints Dominic and Catherine of Siena by Castellucci. Another altarpiece depicts the Trinity with Saints Artemius, Candida, and Anthony of Padua; relics associated with these martyrs were said to have been transferred from the Catacomb of Callixtus in Rome.

The high altar features a Transfiguration by Giovanni Maria Colombi and his collaborators. A wooden crucifix attributed to the Bernini school is also present. The sacristy preserves liturgical furnishings and silver objects donated by Cardinal Poli.
