= Los Cerritos, Colorado =

Unincorporated community in Conejos County, Colorado, US

Coordinates: 37°08′54″N 105°54′39″W

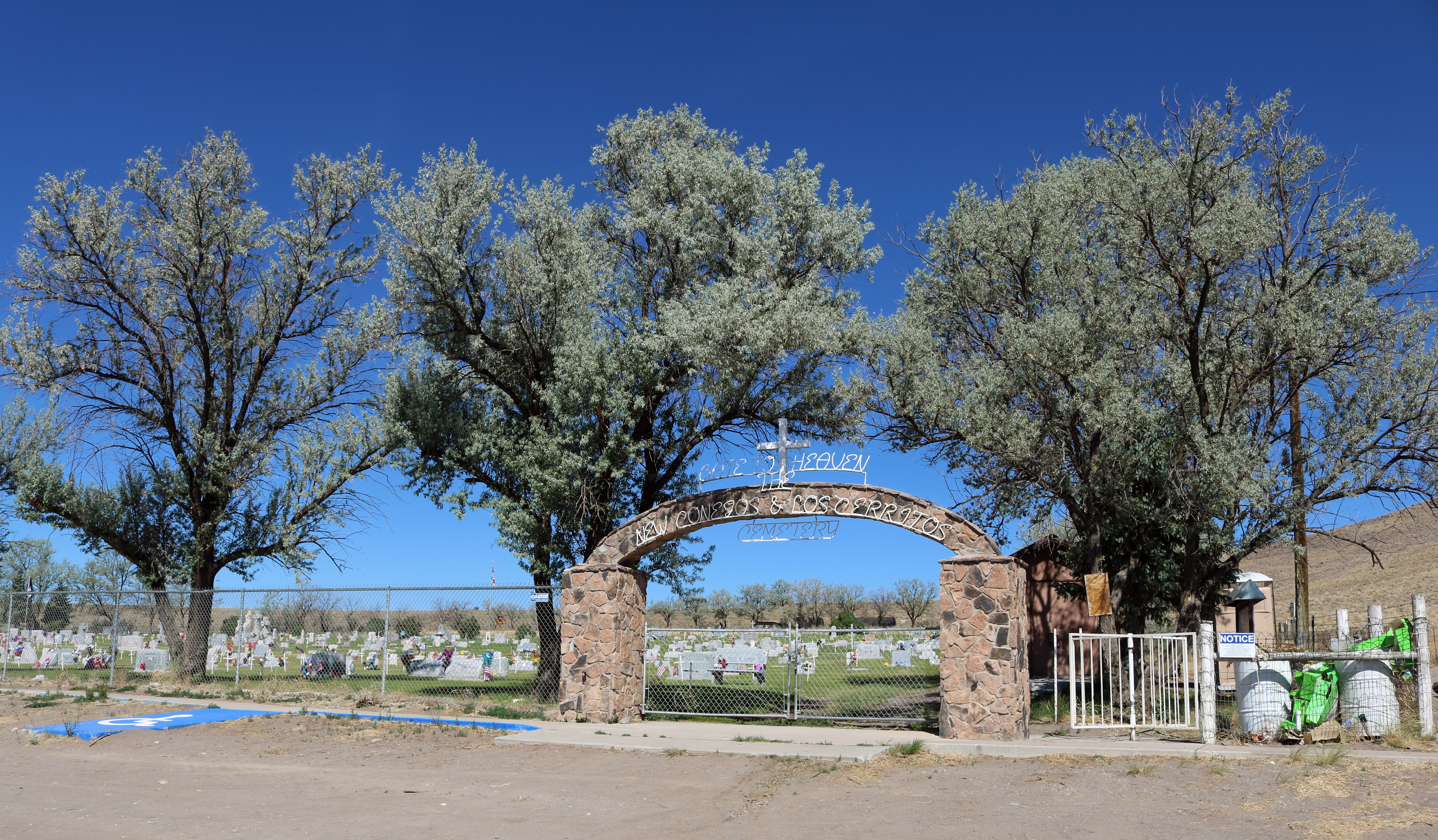
The New Conejos & Los Cerritos Cemetery in Los Cerritos

Los Cerritos is an unincorporated community in Conejos County, in the U.S. state of Colorado.

== History ==
A post office called Los Cerritos was established in 1889, and remained in operation until 1914. Los Cerritos is a name derived from Spanish meaning "the little hills".
