= Cerreto Abbey =

Former abbey in Abbadia Cerreto, Italy

- Location within Italy
- Interactive map of Cerreto Abbey

Monastery information
- Order: Cistercian
- Established: 1084

Site
- Location: Abbadia Cerreto, Italy
- Coordinates: 45°18′43″N 9°35′43″E

Cerreto Abbey (Latin: Abbazia del Cerreto) is a former Cistercian monastery in the town of Abbadia Cerreto, in the province of Lodi, region of Lombardy, Italy. The town is named after the abbey. The building now functions as a parish church.

== History ==
The original monastery, with surrounding territory, was founded by the Benedictines, but in 1139, the monks at the institution identified themselves as Cistercians. By 1500, the monastery had been reduced to a few members, and the abbey church was converted into a parish church. In 1700, the monks abandoned the abbey to local priests. In 1801, the Napoleonic government expropriated all the goods and sold them to the Marchese Giorgio Teodoro Trivulzio.
