= Borgo Cerreto =

- Frazione
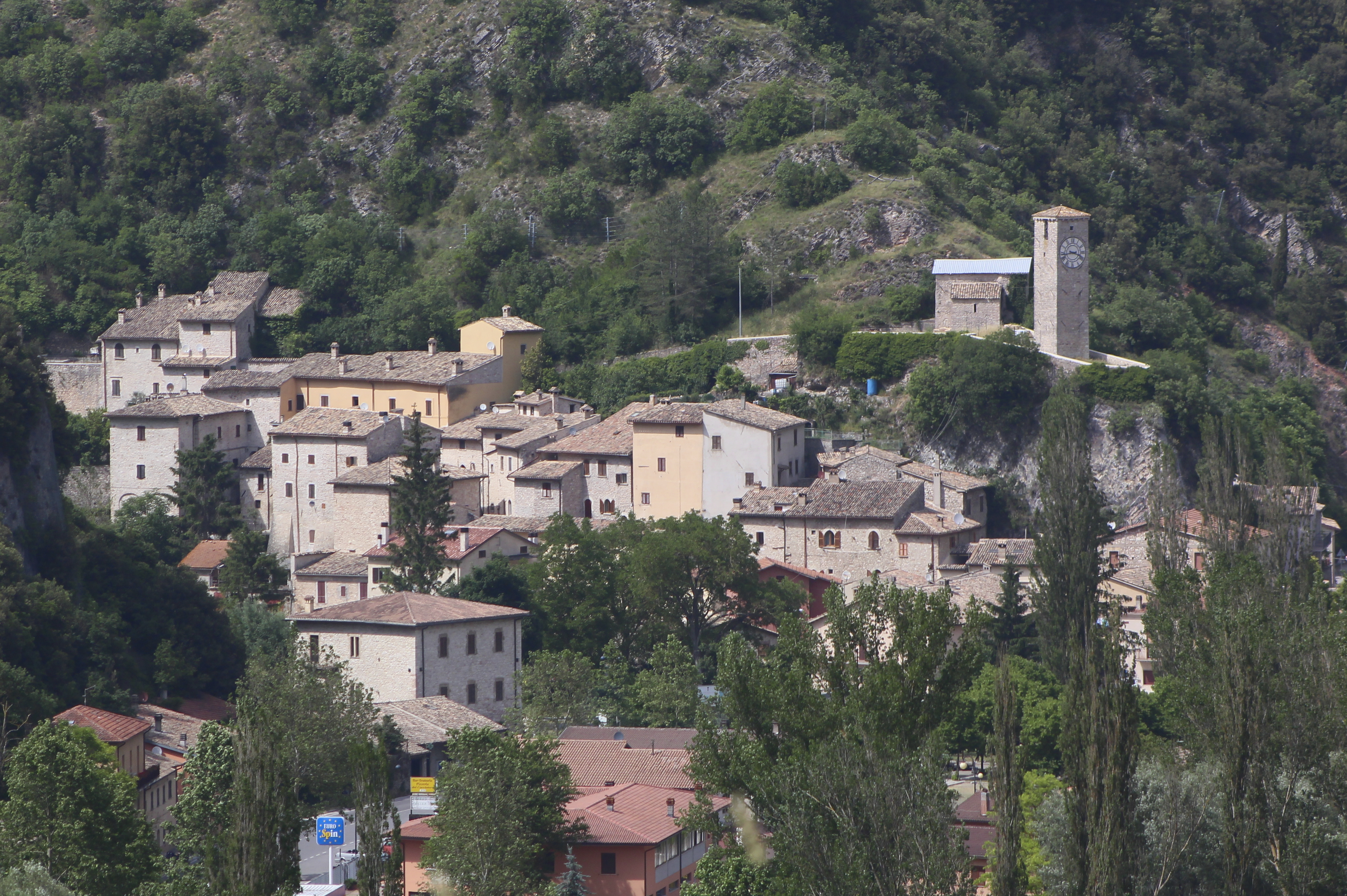
- Borgo Cerreto

- Location within Italy
- Coordinates: 42°48′55″N 12°54′57″E
- Country: Italy
- Region: Umbria
- Province: Perugia
- Comune: Cerreto di Spoleto
- Elevation: 357 m (1,171 ft)

Population (2001)
  - Total: 170
- Time zone: UTC+1 (CET)
  - Summer (DST): UTC+2 (CEST)
- Postcode: 06040
- Area code: 0743

Borgo Cerreto is a frazione of the comune of Cerreto di Spoleto in the Province of Perugia, Umbria, central Italy. It stands at an elevation of 357 metres above sea level. At the time of the Istat census of 2001 it had 170 inhabitants.

The church of San Lorenzo

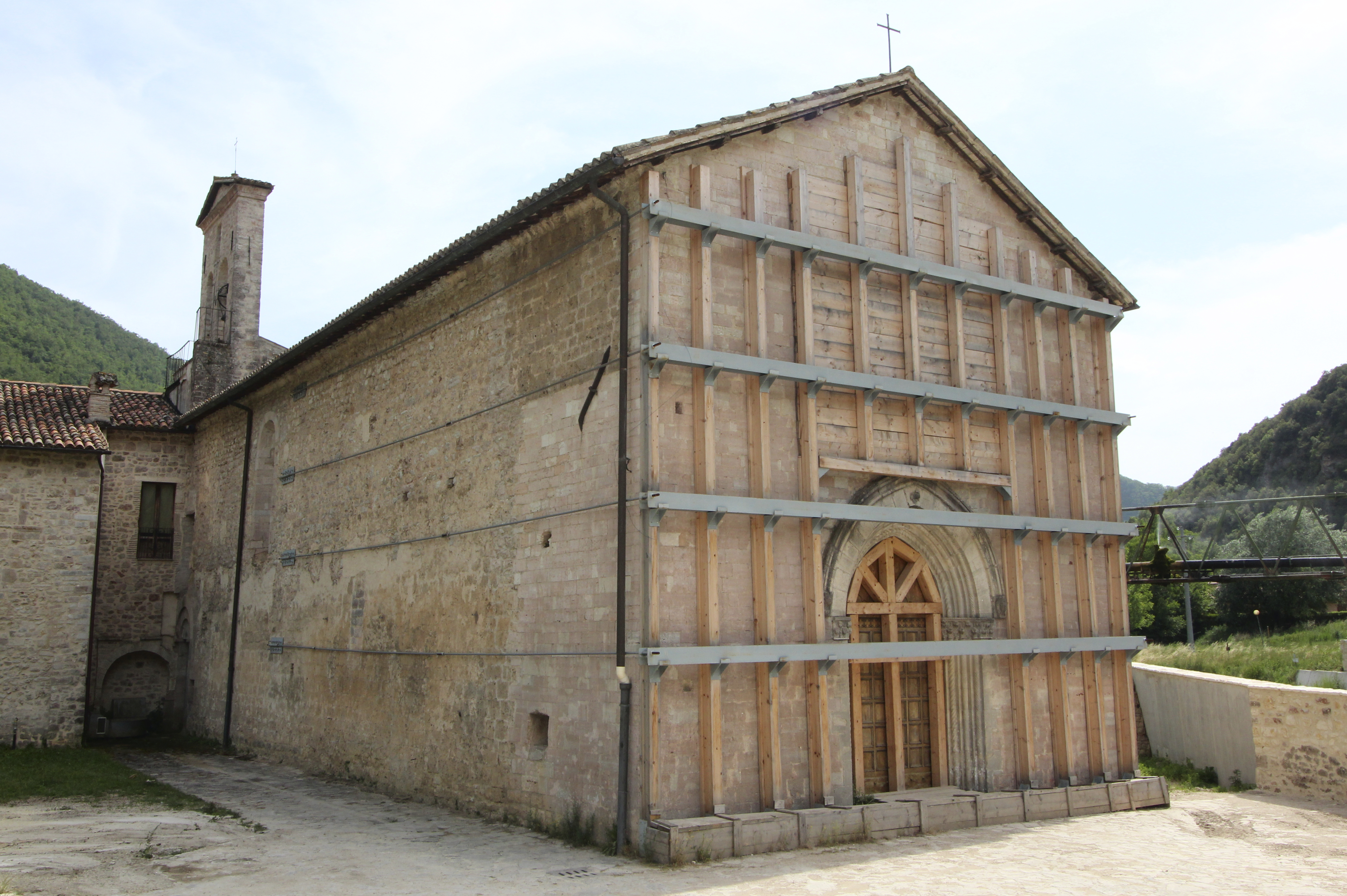

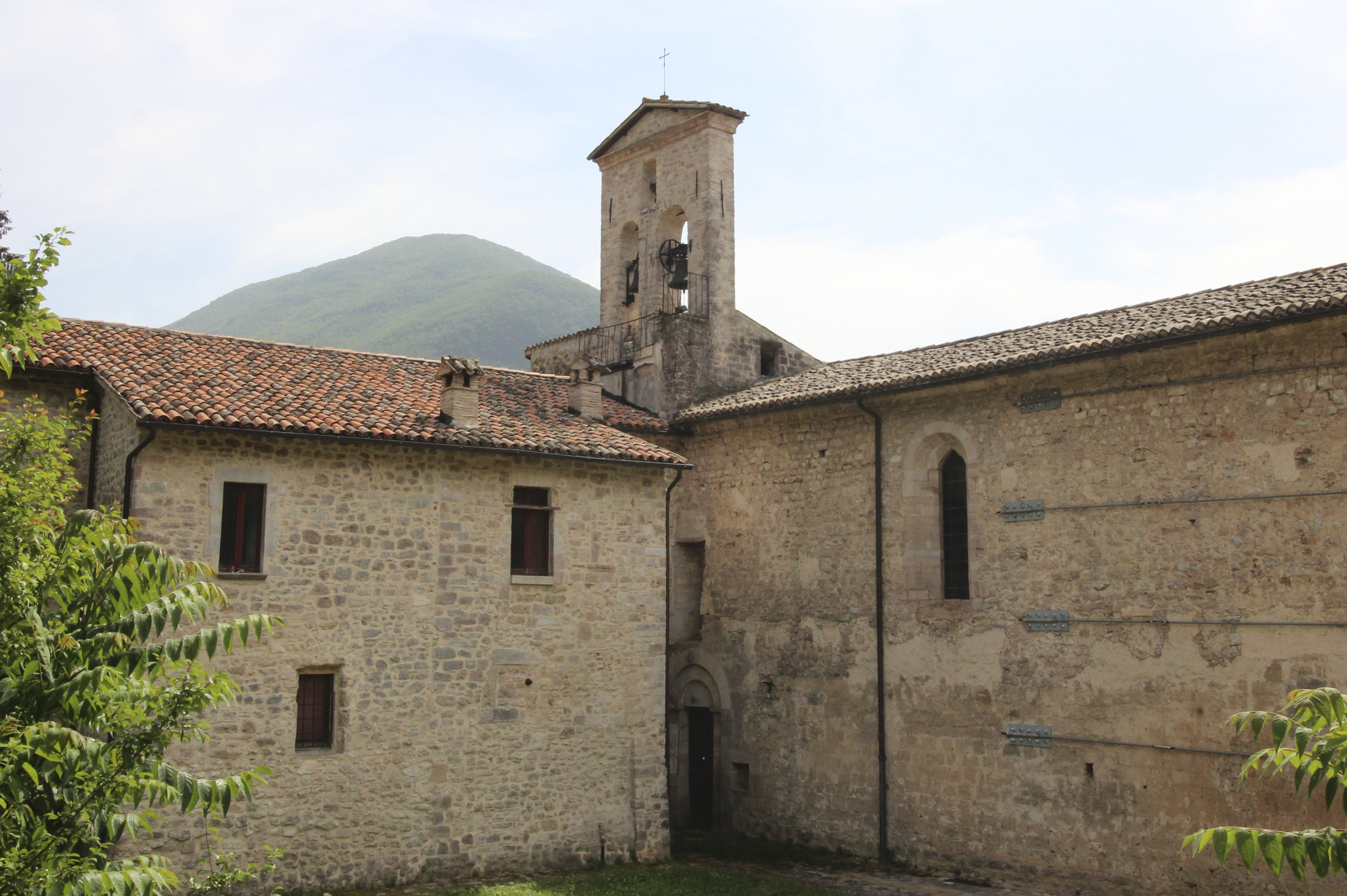
