= Poggiodomo =

- Comune
- Comune di Poggiodomo
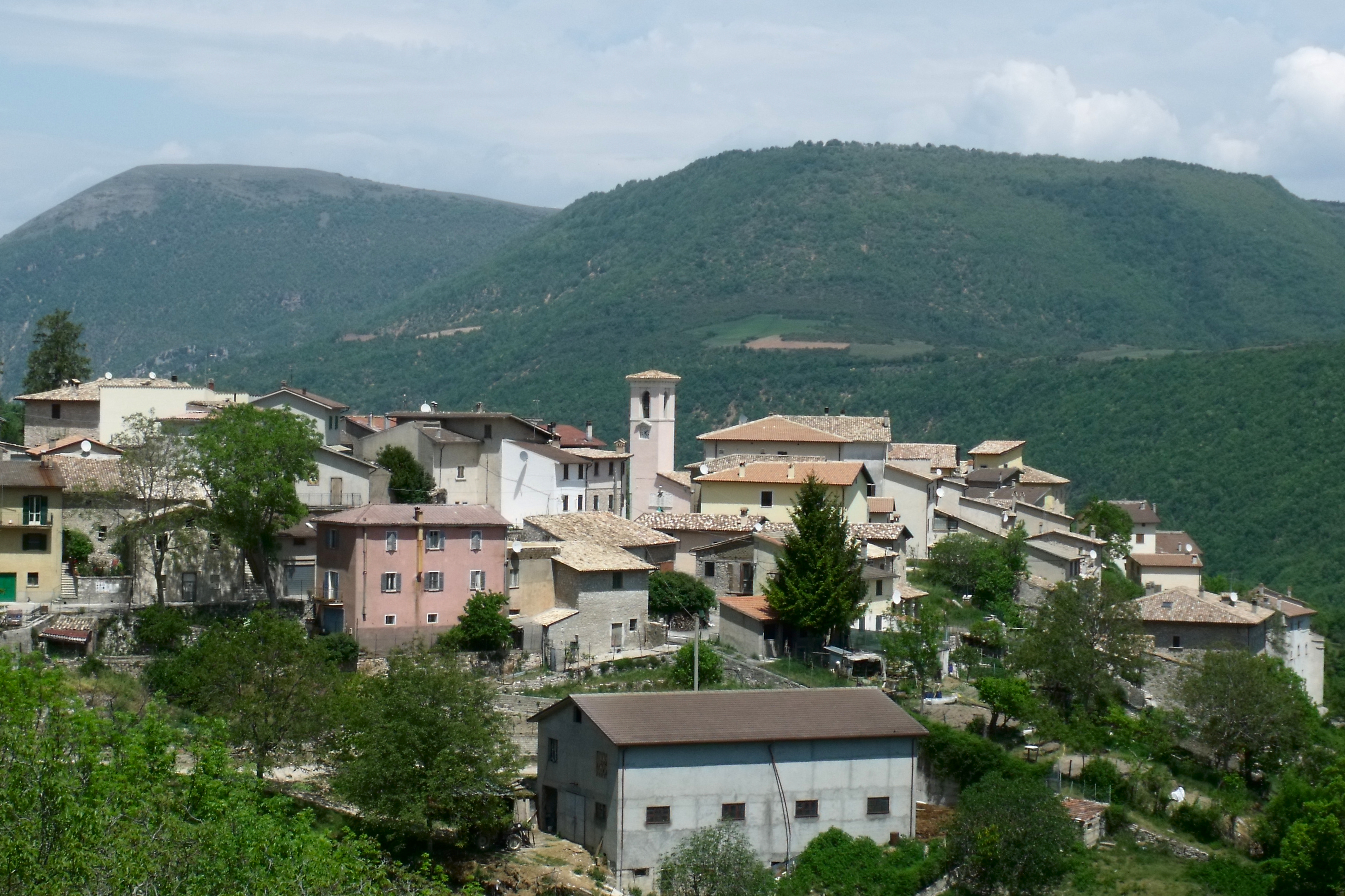
- View of Poggiodomo

- Coat of arms

- Location within Italy Location within Umbria
- Coordinates: 42.711714°N 12.934768°E
- Country: Italy
- Region: Umbria
- Province: Perugia (PG)

Government
  - Mayor: Filippo Marini

Area
  - Total: 40.09 km^{2} (15.48 sq mi)
- Elevation: 974 m (3,196 ft)

Population (1 January 2025)
  - Total: 84
  - Density: 2.1/km^{2} (5.4/sq mi)
- Demonym: Pojani (Poiani)
- Time zone: UTC+1 (CET)
  - Summer (DST): UTC+2 (CEST)
- Postal code: 06040
- Dialing code: 0743
- Patron saint: St. Anthony of Padua
- Saint day: Last week of August
- Website: Official website

Poggiodomo is a comune (municipality) in the Province of Perugia in the Italian region Umbria, located about 80 km southeast of Perugia.

== Etymology ==
According to the 19th-century account of Adone Palmieri, the settlement was formerly known as Poggio d'Oro ("Golden Hill"), a name he attributes to the presence of several wealthy families; he further suggests that the present name derives from a later linguistic corruption of that earlier form.

== History ==
Poggiodomo is first mentioned in documentary sources in the 13th century. On 22 October 1233 it was listed among the possessions of the Duchy of Spoleto. In 1276 the castle was donated to Spoleto by Mimaldesca, daughter of Oderisio.

During the 14th century the settlement was transferred from the jurisdiction of Spoleto to that of Cascia. In the 15th and 16th centuries it experienced boundary disputes and episodes of factional unrest, reflecting the broader instability of the whole region. In 1527, amid the incursions of Landsknechts and the mercenaries of Sciarra II Colonna, the community placed itself under the protection of Spoleto. In 1536 the claims of Cascia over the territory were formally confirmed.

In the late 16th century the area was affected by the spread of banditry. As a response, the Prefecture of the Mountain was reestablished and a military garrison stationed at Norcia in an effort to restore order. Conditions improved in the 17th century, when unrest declined and a phase of economic recovery followed.

On 17 May 1809, Poggiodomo was annexed to the First French Empire and in the same year was elevated to the status of mairie within the Department of Trasimeno. After the fall of Napoleonic rule, the papal administrative restoration of 1816–1818 confirmed Poggiodomo's municipal status.

During the Roman Republic of 1849 documentation is limited, but from that year until October 1851 the municipality was governed by a commission. Ordinary municipal administration was restored on 1 November 1851. In 1859, Poggiodomo had a population of 710 inhabitants.

The 20th century brought significant infrastructural improvements. Between 1927 and the 1930s Poggiodomo and Usigni were electrified; after 1947 electricity reached Mucciafora and Roccatamburo. Aqueducts and a school building were constructed in the 1930s. Despite these developments, the century was marked by a steady population decline.

== Geography ==
Poggiodomo is situated at an elevation of 970 metres (3,180 ft), in a mountain gorge on the banks of the Fissino stream, a tributary of the Nera. It lies near the junction of the road from Terni leading to Norcia and to Cascia. The municipal territory is almost entirely mountainous.

The climate was described as cold. The nearest stream is called Valle, while nearby woods include Sutri and Cuperno; from Mount Cuperno there is an extensive view of the surrounding landscape.

Poggiodomo borders the following municipalities: Cascia, Cerreto di Spoleto, Monteleone di Spoleto, Sant'Anatolia di Narco, Vallo di Nera.

=== Subdivisions ===
The municipality includes the localities of Mucciafora, Poggiodomo, Roccatamburo, Usigni.

In 2021, the most populous localities were Poggiodomo proper (46), Mucciafora (26), Roccatamburo (20). Usigni lies about 2 miles (3.2 km) from Poggiodomo, and Roccatamburo about 3 miles (4.8 km) away.

== Economy ==
In the mid-19th century, the local economy was primarily agricultural, with moderate grain cultivation and wine production.

== Demographics ==
At the time of Italian unification in 1861, the population stood at 988 inhabitants, rising steadily over the following decades to reach a peak of 1,350 in 1901. This marked the high point in the village's population.

From the early 20th century onward, Poggiodomo experienced a pronounced and continuous decline. By 1911 the population had already fallen slightly to 1,278, and the downward trend accelerated after World War I, dropping to 946 in 1921. Despite a brief stabilization in the interwar period (1,102 in 1931), the population resumed its decline, falling to 731 by 1951.

The second half of the 20th century saw a dramatic depopulation. The number of residents decreased from 575 in 1961 to just 298 in 1981, eventually reaching 220 in 1991.

The population fell to just 84 inhabitants by 2025.

== Religion and culture ==
The town has the churches of San Lorenzo and San Pietro, the latter equipped with an organ. The patron saint is Saint Anthony of Padua, whose feast is celebrated on the fourth Sunday of August.

=== San Carlo Borromeo ===
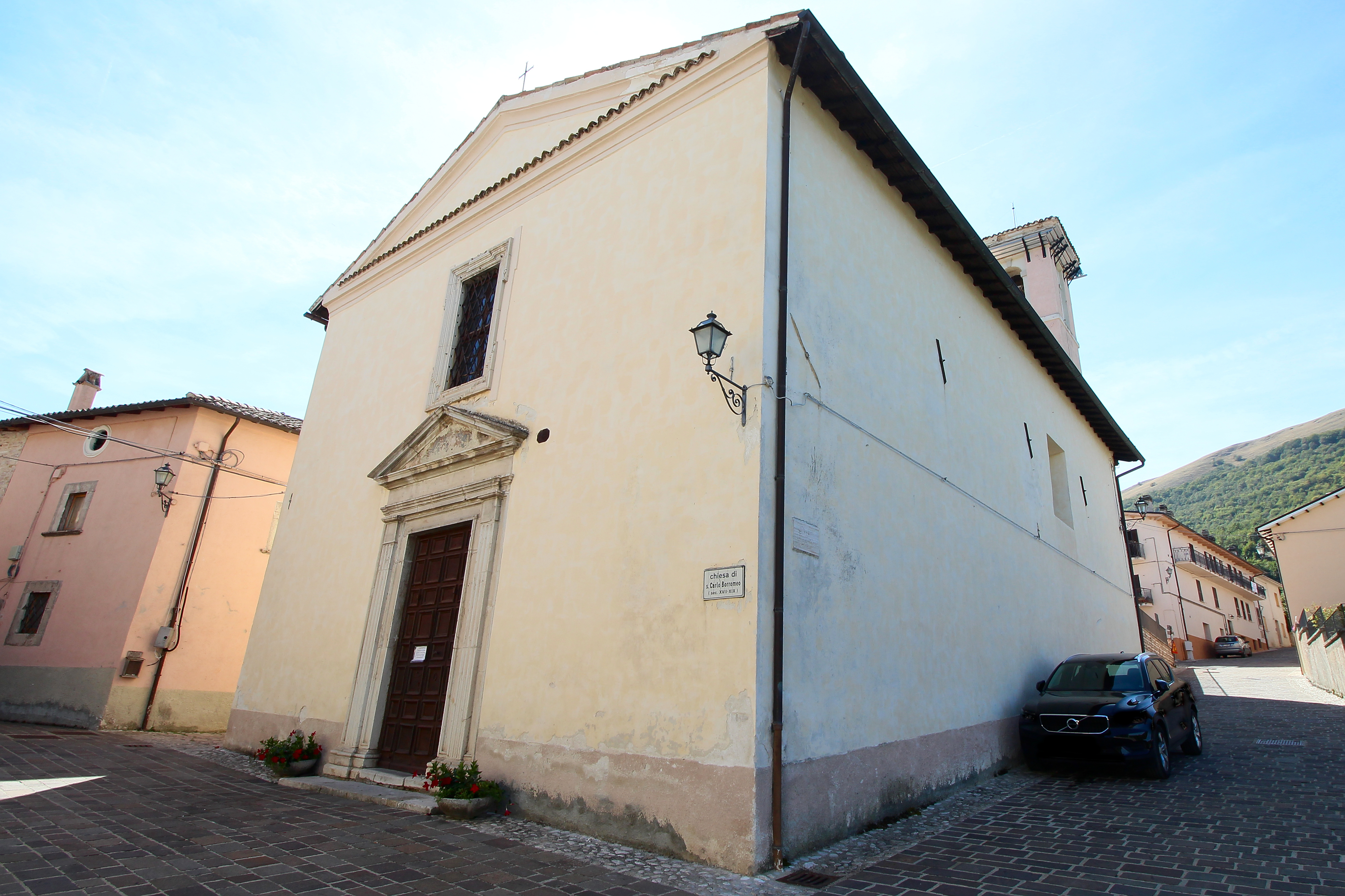
The church of San Carlo Borromeo presents a plain stucco façade with a sharply defined triangular pediment.

The Church of San Carlo Borromeo was built in 1635 to replace the earlier Church of Saint Anthony of Padua, which stood within the castle walls and has since disappeared. The façade includes a Renaissance-style portal. The interior has a single nave with a square presbytery and contains nine wooden altars dating to the 17th and 18th centuries. Eight of these were placed along the sides of the nave and were donated by noble families of the village.

The high altar is dedicated to Saint Charles Borromeo and is flanked by wooden statues of Saint Macarius and Saint Roch. Above it stands a large crucifix with two angels. The emblem of the Congregazione dei Possidenti, later adopted as the coat of arms of the municipality of Poggiodomo, appears on the base of the altar and on the choir.

=== Madonna della Stella ===
The hermitage of the Madonna della Stella is located in the Valle del Noce near Roccatamburo, between Poggiodomo and Cerreto di Spoleto. It originated in the 7th century as a Benedictine monastic cell dependent on the Abbey of Farfa, later passing to the Abbey of San Pietro in Valle near Ferentillo.

In the 14th century the site came under the Augustinians of Cascia, who established the hermitage of Santa Croce, carving cells and a small church into the rock. The church was frescoed in 1416 with works of the Umbrian school influenced by Sienese painting. It underwent restoration in 1525.

From the 17th century the hermitage was gradually abandoned by its occupants. In 1809, following the reorganization of ecclesiastical property, its administration passed to the municipality of Poggiodomo. In the same year the remains of the church and an image of the Madonna were rediscovered, giving rise to reports of miraculous apparitions, later interpreted as the rediscovery of ancient frescoes.

The site took the name "Madonna della Stella" from the star-shaped decoration on the Madonna's garment. It was the subject of disputes among nearby communities before being definitively assigned in 1970 to the local administration of civic lands of Roccatamburo.

Pilgrimages to the hermitage developed over time, with processions organized on successive Sundays in May by different neighboring communities. Devotional practices included the use of oil from a lamp burning before the image of the Madonna, believed to have healing properties. Numerous ex voto offerings are preserved at the site.
