= Chañar Punco =

Coordinates: 26.7239°S 66.0769°W

- Municipality and village
- Interactive map of Chañar Punco
- Country: Argentina
- Province: Catamarca Province
- Time zone: UTC−3 (ART)

Chañar Punco is a village and municipality in Catamarca Province in northwestern Argentina.
