= Casa de Piedra, La Pampa =

Coordinates: 38°09′26″S 67°08′51″W

Casa de Piedra (La Pampa)
- Rural locality and village
- Interactive map of Casa de Piedra (La Pampa)
- Country: Argentina
- Province: La Pampa Province
- Time zone: UTC−3 (ART)

Casa de Piedra (La Pampa) is a village and rural locality (municipality) in La Pampa Province in Argentina.

== Climate ==
Climate data for Casa de Piedra, La Pampa (1980–1987)
Month	Jan	Feb	Mar	Apr	May	Jun	Jul	Aug	Sep	Oct	Nov	Dec	Year
Record high °C (°F)	40.2 (104.4)	42.5 (108.5)	39.5 (103.1)	32.6 (90.7)	26.5 (79.7)	27.6 (81.7)	24.0 (75.2)	30.0 (86.0)	29.5 (85.1)	36.0 (96.8)	39.8 (103.6)	41.5 (106.7)	42.5 (108.5)
Mean daily maximum °C (°F)	32.1 (89.8)	30.9 (87.6)	26.0 (78.8)	20.1 (68.2)	15.8 (60.4)	11.4 (52.5)	12.0 (53.6)	15.1 (59.2)	17.6 (63.7)	23.3 (73.9)	27.1 (80.8)	30.2 (86.4)	21.8 (71.2)
Daily mean °C (°F)	24.8 (76.6)	23.3 (73.9)	20.1 (68.2)	14.6 (58.3)	10.4 (50.7)	6.5 (43.7)	6.6 (43.9)	8.7 (47.7)	11.6 (52.9)	16.5 (61.7)	20.0 (68.0)	23.2 (73.8)	15.5 (59.9)
Mean daily minimum °C (°F)	17.8 (64.0)	16.2 (61.2)	12.7 (54.9)	9.0 (48.2)	4.7 (40.5)	1.6 (34.9)	1.7 (35.1)	2.1 (35.8)	5.3 (41.5)	9.7 (49.5)	12.9 (55.2)	16.1 (61.0)	9.2 (48.6)
Record low °C (°F)	8.2 (46.8)	4.0 (39.2)	0.8 (33.4)	−2.0 (28.4)	−6.8 (19.8)	−7.4 (18.7)	−9.0 (15.8)	−8.2 (17.2)	−5.0 (23.0)	−2.0 (28.4)	2.5 (36.5)	8.0 (46.4)	−9.0 (15.8)
Average precipitation mm (inches)	31.4 (1.24)	21.6 (0.85)	41.2 (1.62)	30.1 (1.19)	16.1 (0.63)	20.2 (0.80)	15.1 (0.59)	12.8 (0.50)	29.0 (1.14)	26.4 (1.04)	19.7 (0.78)	18.9 (0.74)	273.8 (10.78)
Average relative humidity (%)	37	38	47	57	60	67	68	58	51	44	36	36	50
Percentage possible sunshine	74	78	68	61	48	42	44	58	52	61	69	73	61
Source: Secretaria de Mineria
