= Bruno Abbatini =

Italian footballer (1938-2017)

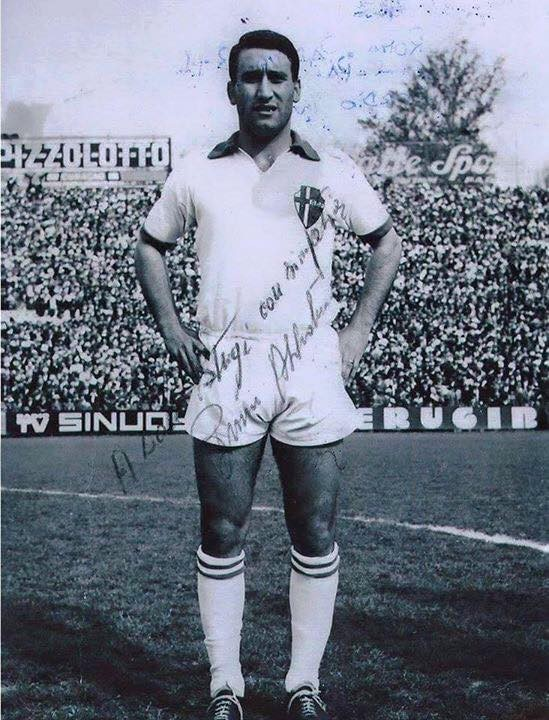

Personal information
- Positions: Midfielder; forward

Senior career*
Years	Team	Apps	(Gls)
1959–1960	AS Ostia Mare		
1960–1961	AS Tevere Roma	28	(4)
1961–1962	AS Roma	2	(0)
1962–1963	AC Cesena	20	(7)
1963–1965	Padova	61	(4)
1965–1968	Avellino	85	(15)
1968-1969	ASD GC Sora		
- * Club domestic league appearances and goals

Bruno Abbatini (30 June 1938 Genzano di Roma Italy, – 31 March 2017 Albano Laziale, Italy) was an Italian football player, who played as midfielder and forward and has been a trainer.

He played for Ostia Mare, US Tevere Roma, AS Roma, Cesena, Padova, Avellino and ASD GC Sora. He was a trainer at Cynthia, Aprilia, Nemi, Viterbese and Cassino.

The Bruno Abbantini Municipal Stadium in Genzano di Roma is named after him.

== Further information ==
- 100anni.padovacalcio.it profil
