= Santa María Department, Catamarca =

Santa María Departamento Santa María
- Department
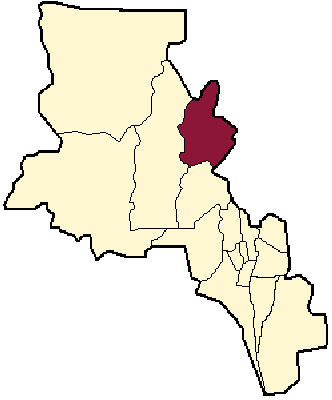
- location of Santa María Department in Catamarca Province
- Coordinates: 26°41′S 66°02′W
- Country: Argentina
- Established: ?
- Founder: ?
- Seat: Santa María

Government
  - Mayor: Julio Hilario Lagoria, FCS

Area
  - Total: 5,740 km^{2} (2,220 sq mi)

Population (2001 census [INDEC])
  - Total: 22,127
  - Density: 3.85/km^{2} (9.98/sq mi)
- Demonym: ?
- Postal Code: K4139
- IFAM: CAT028
- Area Code: 03838
- Patron saint: ?
- Website: www.camsencat.gov.ar/stamaria.html

Santa María is a north eastern department of Catamarca Province in Argentina.

The provincial subdivision has a population of about 22,000 inhabitants in an area of 5,740 km^{2} (2,220 sq mi), and its capital city is Santa María.

== Villages ==
- Caspichango

== See also ==
- Chañar Punco
