= Cerreto di Spoleto =

- Comune
- Comune di Cerreto di Spoleto
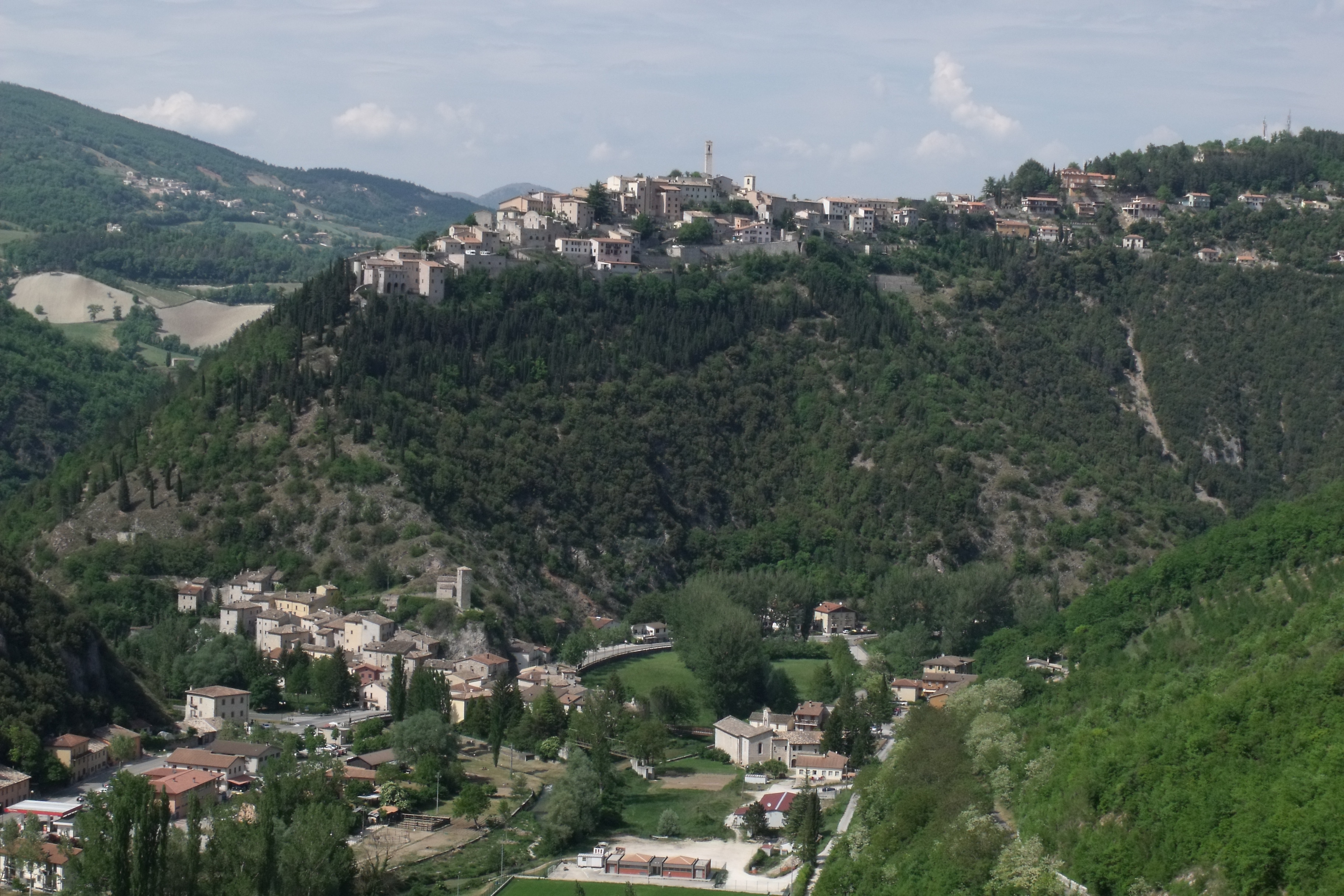
- Cerreto di Spoleto

- Coat of arms

- Location within Italy Location within Umbria
- Coordinates: 42.821024°N 12.917266°E
- Country: Italy
- Region: Umbria
- Province: Perugia

Government
  - Mayor: Giovanna Forti in Benedetti

Area
  - Total: 74.79 km^{2} (28.88 sq mi)
- Elevation: 557 m (1,827 ft)

Population (1 January 2025)
  - Total: 958
  - Density: 12.8/km^{2} (33.2/sq mi)
- Demonym: Cerretani
- Time zone: UTC+1 (CET)
  - Summer (DST): UTC+2 (CEST)
- Postal code: 06040
- Dialing code: 0743
- Patron saint: Saint Nicholas of Bari
- Saint day: Pentecost
- Website: Official website

Cerreto di Spoleto is an Italian village and comune of the province of Perugia in Umbria. It is a dispersed rural community spread over eight frazioni.

== Etymology ==
Cerreto takes its name from the cerri (Quercus cerris), oak trees that abound in the surrounding mountains. The name is also associated with a large oak tree that stood in the main square until the 18th century.

== History ==
=== Antiquity and Middle Ages ===
According to a tradition reported in the 19th century by Baronio in his Storia di Cerreto, Cerreto was founded in 471 during the pontificate of Pope Hilarius by French nobles expelled from their homeland. This origin is presented as uncertain.

In the medieval period Cerreto was economically prosperous, maintaining contractual relations with charitable institutions and hospitals.

In the early Middle Ages Cerreto formed part of the Duchy of Spoleto and was governed successively by imperial and then papal officials. Between 1198 and 1216, under Pope Innocent III, it was incorporated into the Papal States.

Its elevated position made it a strategic stronghold throughout the medieval period, and it was contested by Spoleto and Norcia. In 1221 it submitted to Spoleto while remaining opposed to Norcia and Ponte. In 1232 it paid tribute to the emperor, but in 1247 it returned to papal control following conflicts with Frederick II.

In 1268 Cerreto came under the control of the Varano family, dukes of Camerino, as a reward for their loyalty to the papacy. During the 14th century local governance was influenced by both Spoleto and Norcia, within the broader context of Guelph and Ghibelline conflicts. The reforms of Cardinal Gil Albornoz strengthened centralized papal authority. In 1380 municipal statutes were issued.

During the 15th century Cerreto was involved in continued conflicts with Norcia and experienced shifting control between the papacy and Spoleto. In 1425 it was assigned to Norcia by Pope Martin V, then in 1434 it submitted to Francesco Sforza, who occupied it in 1436. In 1443 Pope Eugene IV returned it to Spoleto. In 1474 it was again ceded to the Varano family, restoring the influence of Camerino. In 1504, following the peace of Mevale under Pope Julius II, it returned to Spoleto.

=== Modern Era ===
In 1569 the Prefettura della Montagna was established, introducing a centralized judicial authority over the area.

During the 17th century warfare declined, but this period was marked by economic and demographic decline as well as frequent earthquakes. A major earthquake in 1703 caused significant damage and led to population displacement toward Spoleto and Rome.

Between 1798 and 1799 Cerreto came under French rule within the Department of Clitunno, with Spoleto as its capital. In 1808 it was annexed to the French Empire and included in the Department of Trasimeno under the subprefecture of Spoleto. In 1814 papal rule was restored and the previous administrative structure reinstated.

In the 19th century administrative reforms under Pope Pius VII led to a reorganization of governance and the abolition of the old statutes. In 1860 a plebiscite resulted in annexation to the Kingdom of Italy.

In the mid-19th century Cerreto had a population of 1,110 inhabitants. Of these, 544 lived in the main settlement and 566 in the surrounding countryside.

Water has historically been scarce; according to Adone Palmieri, an aqueduct from the Fonte di Fabbri, about 4 miles (6.4 km) distant, had been abandoned for about a century by the 19th century, while the nearest active spring, Fonte del Perfetto, was about 2 miles (3.2 km) away. Weekly markets and summer fairs had fallen into disuse due to water shortages.

== Geography ==
Cerreto di Spoleto stands on the summit of a hill at an elevation of 558 metres (1,831 ft) above sea level. It lies near the river Nera and its tributary, the Vigi, along the road from Spoleto to Norcia, at a distance of 26 kilometres (16 mi) from Spoleto.

The borgo lies on flat ground, while the main settlement rises along the slope of a mountain lower than the surrounding Apennines.

The river Nera flows about 0.5 miles (0.80 km) to the east, while the river Vigi lies at a similar distance to the north; both irrigate the valleys surrounding the hill on which Cerreto stands. The area is characterized by coppice woods and forested land, including the Bosco di Maiggi about 3 miles (4.8 km) away.

At a distance of about 3 miles (4.8 km), near Triponzo and not far from the confluence of the Corno and Nera rivers, there are sulphurous and thermal springs.

=== Subdivisions ===
The municipality includes the localities of Borgo Cerreto, Bugiano, Bugianpiccolo, Cerreto di Spoleto, Colle Soglio, Macchia, Nortosce, Ponte, Rocchetta, Triponzo.

In 2021, 289 people lived in rural dispersed dwellings not assigned to any named locality. At the time, the most populous localities were Cerreto di Spoleto (306), Borgo Cerreto (143).

Ponte di Cerreto is a village of about 200 inhabitants about a mile south of Cerreto. Though now insignificant, Ponte was once an important defensive outpost overlooking the first bridge over the Nera River. The counts of Celano built a fortress at this site, which has not survived. Today, the village is best known for the 12th-century Romanesque abbey church of Santa Maria: the façade includes a very good rose window, and the interior is notable for preserving the architect's sketch of that window, engraved on one of the walls of the nave. Among the frescoes is an almost equally rare depiction of the Trinity as a three-headed man.

Rocchetta di Cerreto lies at 793 metres (2,602 ft) above sea-level on a ridge above and to the east of the Tissino River. Its principal sights are three churches, two of them medieval and the third of the 16th‑18th centuries, of which the best is San Nicola, with a frescoed interior.

== Economy ==
In the 19th century the local economy was based on agricultural production, including wine, grain, highly prized truffles, wood, and acorns.

=== Baths of Triponzo ===
The thermal baths of Triponzo are known since antiquity and traditionally associated with references dating to the Roman period. They are first documented in 1488, when the baths, already functioning, were transferred to the municipality of Norcia for 151 gold florins. They later passed to Pasquale Forti and to the bishop of Norcia, Bucchi-Accica, who donated them to the municipality of Cerreto.

The baths use sulfurous thermal waters containing sulfur, magnesium, and other elements. The water maintains a constant temperature of about 30 °C. The site is supplied by eighteen springs of sulfurous water emerging in the Valnerina.

== Religion and culture ==
=== Santa Maria Assunta ===
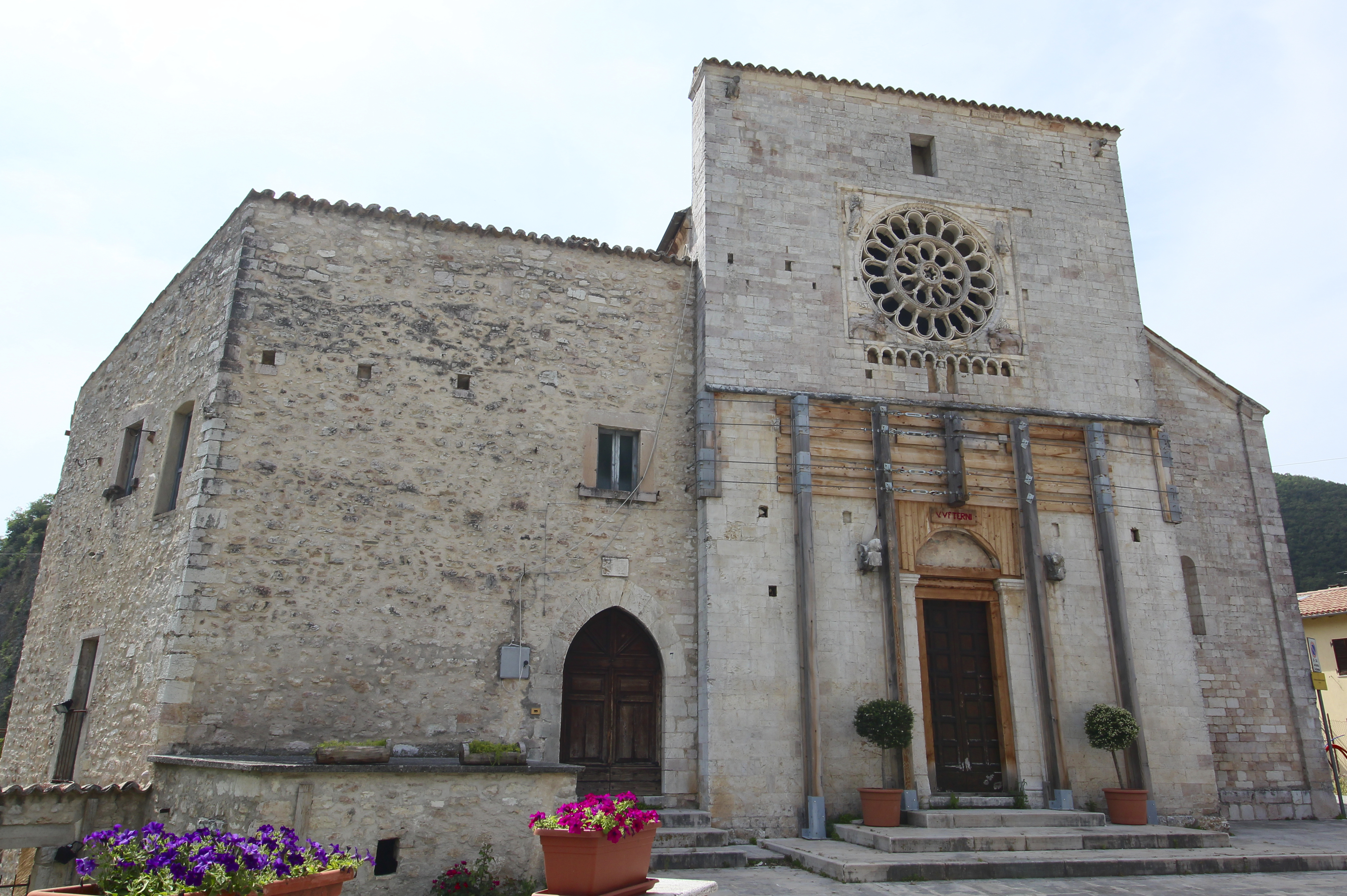
Church of Santa Maria Assunta, Ponte, hamlet of Cerreto

The parish church of Santa Maria Assunta is a Romanesque building with a single nave terminating in an apse, a projecting transept, and a tiburio with a dome at the crossing. A smaller aisle is attached to the right wall of the main structure. The façade, which has a later horizontal termination, is decorated with a rose window carved and ornamented with mosaic elements, Evangelist symbols, and two telamons at the lower part. The portal has concentric recessed moldings and retains in the lunette remains of a 14th-century fresco of the Madonna with Angels. The exterior apse is decorated with blind arcades supported by protruding elements, pilasters, and half-columns.

The external masonry preserves Romanesque wall construction. On the interior right wall near the entrance is an incised design representing the project for the rose window. Frescoes in the right chapel include the Evangelists in the vault, Christ at Calvary in the lunette, Christ in the Garden and Saint Michael in the arch, dating to the 16th century. The apse contains a Nativity of the 16th century and a Marriage of Saint Catherine dated 1519, while angels of the early 14th century appear above. In the left transept is a Madonna with Saints of the 16th century. Along the left wall are a detached 15th-century fresco of the Crucifix with Saints, figures of a saint and Saint Augustine from the 15th century, and a Madonna of the Rosary from the 17th century.

The church preserves two wooden Madonnas of the 14th century, a painted canvas Deposition derived from a work by Daniele da Volterra, and surviving portions of the fresco decoration. The baptismal font uses a large monolithic Roman basalt basin. A painted panel fragment representing the Madonna Enthroned with Angels and Saints, attributed to the early 14th-century Umbrian painter known as the Maestro di Cesi, is preserved in the diocesan collection of Spoleto.

The church contains an organ by Maccioni.

=== Sanctuary of Madonna della Stella ===
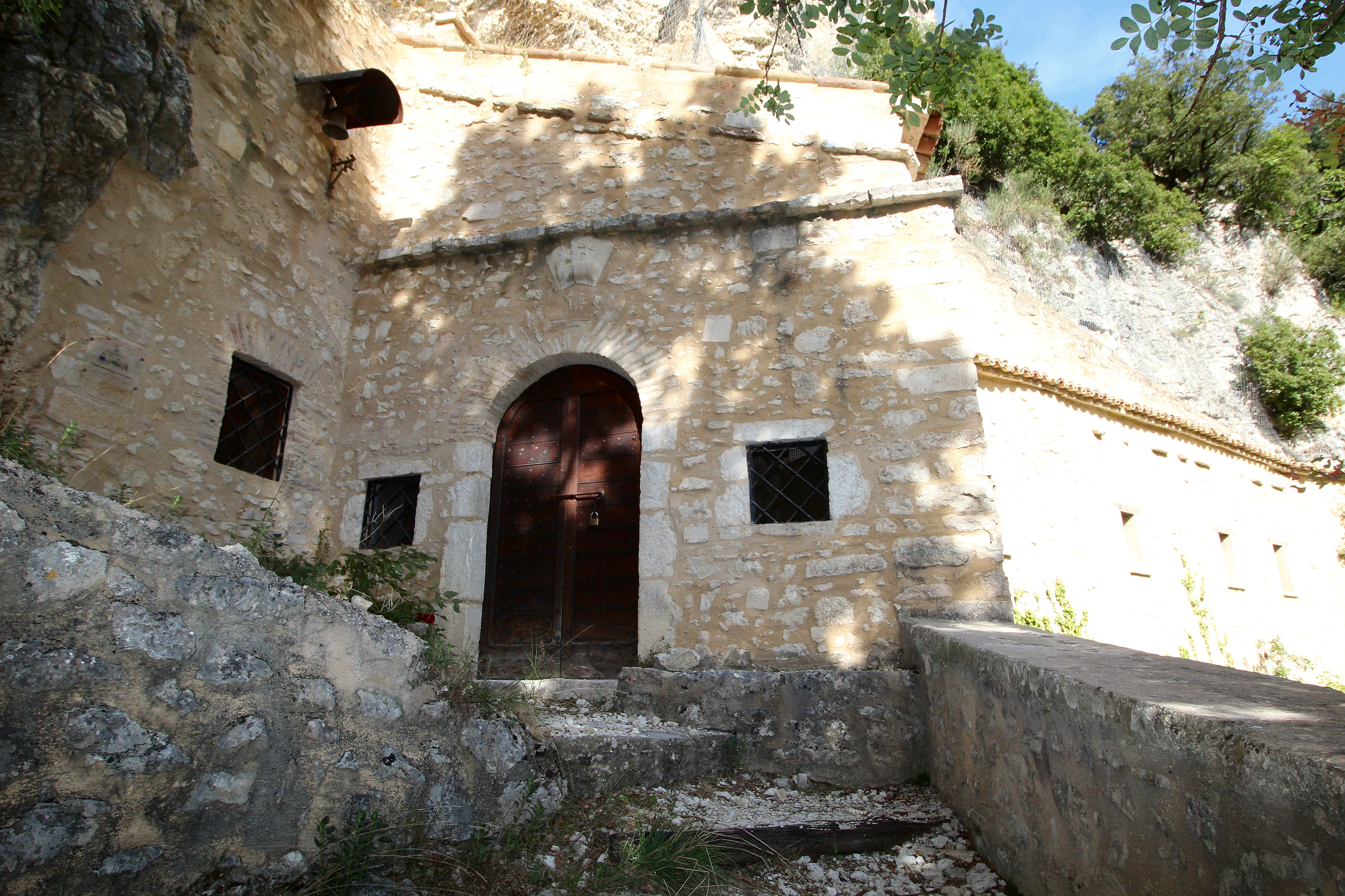
Sanctuary of Madonna della Stella

The sanctuary of Madonna della Stella, formerly the Church of Santa Croce, stands in the Noce valley not far from Cerreto. The present structure dates to 1308 and was built on the site of an earlier oratory of the 8th century. According to tradition the oratory originally belonged to Farfa Abbey and later passed to the Abbey of San Pietro in Valle, whose monks settled there and dedicated it to Saint Benedict. In 1294 the oratory and monastery passed to the Lateran chapter. The 14th-century church originated as a hermitage for the monks of Saint Augustine.

Parts of the complex, including the refectory and monastic cells, were excavated directly into the rock. The interior consists of a single nave and preserves 14th-century frescoes, one depicting Blessed Simon Fidati. The complex was abandoned in 1652 and remained in poor condition until 1833, when it was restored following reports of miraculous events and assumed the name Madonna della Stella.

The sanctuary was opened for worship from the first Sunday of May to the first Sunday of June, during the Marian month. During this period processions from nearby villages arrived there. Veneration centered on a blood-stained stone which, according to oral tradition, fell from the cave vault and struck a pilgrim who remained unharmed. Garments of those believed to have received miraculous favors were displayed in the sanctuary.

=== Other religious buildings ===
Cerreto contains several churches of artistic and historical interest. In Santa Maria Delibera there are frescoes including a Coronation of the Virgin inspired by Lo Spagna, as well as works influenced by the Perugian school. A painting of the Adoration of the Magi is signed by Felice Damiani and dated 1583.

In the suburb, the church of San Lorenzo contains a painting of the Martyrdom of Saint Lawrence attributed either to Michelangelo Buonarroti or to a close pupil, while popular tradition attributes it to Titian. Another painting depicting Saint Bonaventure is also preserved there.

The church of San Paterniano contains a fresco known as the Madonna delle Grazie. The parish church of Paterno preserves a 16th-century baptismal font.

Near the castle stands the hermitage of Pie di Paterno, a ruined church founded in the early 12th century. It retains traces of votive frescoes and a wooden sculpture of the Virgin and Child dating to the 13th century in a Byzantine style.

At Triponzo, the church of Santa Caterina has a Corinthian-style portal surmounted by a statue of the saint and bearing the date 1543.

The nearby hamlet of Ponte includes the church of Santa Maria, notable for its façade with a circular window framed by columns and sculpted symbols of the Evangelists, as well as a Latin cross interior with a hemispherical dome.

The patron saint is San Nicolò, whose feast is celebrated on 6 December.

=== Church of San Giacomo and former monastery ===
The Church of San Giacomo with its adjoining monastery now houses CEDRAV, the Center for documentation and anthropological research in Valnerina. The façade, corresponding to the left wall of the nave, is decorated with a pointed portal.

Inside the church, on the left wall, is a 1573 painting of the Visitation by Camillo Angelucci di Mevale, a member of a family of painters active in the Valnerina. Other paintings of the 17th century depict Saints Benedict and Scholastica and Saints Michael the Archangel, James, and Philip Neri.

Three walls preserve substantial portions of 15th-century fresco decoration that has been damaged and restored. Among these are an Annunciation, a Crucifixion with Saints, and fragmentary figures. Some of the frescoes, datable to the mid-15th century, are associated with works in the Church of Santa Maria Assunta at Vallo di Nera and the circle of the Maestro di Eggi. On the same wall to the right of a doorway is a 15th-century fresco of Christ in glory with angels bearing the symbols of the Passion, together with Saint Michael the Archangel and praying figures.

In a small adjoining room are late-14th-century frescoes depicting scenes of the Passion and figures of Saint Catherine and a female martyr attributed to the same painter. In a room of the monastery on the lower floor is a fresco of the Last Judgment with Christ within a mandorla, the Virgin Mary, the Apostles above the damned, and the patron, dated to the first half of the 15th century.

== Notable people ==
Cerreto was associated with the Pontano family, originating from one of its suburbs. Among its members were Ludovico, a distinguished jurist; Tommaso, a professor of letters; Ottavio, an erudite jurist; Paolo, a renowned jurist and consistory advocate; and Giovanni Pontano, a writer and statesman who served as secretary to Alfonso of Aragon, king of Naples, and as minister to his successors.

Among other notable figures associated with Cerreto di Spoleto are the organ builder Ennio Bonifazi, the publisher Claudio Argentieri, and the Catholic bishop Antonio Buoncristiani.
