= List of mountains in the Andes =

A sortable list of mountains above 4,000 metres in the South American Andes.

== Considerations ==
The list is an incomplete list of mountains in the Andes. There are many named and unnamed peaks in the Andes that are currently not included in this list. The dividing line between a mountain with multiple peaks and separate mountains is not always clear (see Highest unclimbed mountain). The table below lists the summits with at least 400m prominence.

== List ==
There are one hundred 6,000m peaks in the Andes and nearly 900 peaks over 5,000m.

Mountains of the Andes
Elevation (m)	Name	Range	Coordinates	Image	Country
6,961	Aconcagua	Principal Cordillera	32°39′S 70°01′W		Argentina
6,893	Ojos del Salado	Puna de Atacama	27°06′34″S 68°32′29″W		Argentina – Chile
6,792	Monte Pissis	Puna de Atacama	27°45′S 68°47′W		Argentina
6,768	Huascarán	Cordillera Blanca	9°7′S 77°36′W		Peru
6,759	Bonete	Puna de Atacama	28°01′S 68°45′W		Argentina
6,758	Tres Cruces	Puna de Atacama	27°06′S 68°52′W		Argentina – Chile
6,739	Llullaillaco	Puna de Atacama	24°43′10.8″S 68°31′51.9″W		Argentina – Chile
6,720	Mercedario	Cordillera de la Ramada	31°58′S 70°10′W		Argentina
6,670	Cazadero (Walther Penck)	Puna de Atacama	27°11′S 68°34′W		Argentina
6,638	Incahuasi	Puna de Atacama	27°02′00″S 68°17′48″W		Argentina – Chile
6,634	Yerupajá	Cordillera Huayhuash	10°16′S 76°54′W		Peru
6,565	Tupungato		33°21′12″S 69°46′17″W		Argentina – Chile
6,542	Sajama	Cordillera Occidental	18°6′S 68°53′W		Bolivia
6,500	Ramada Norte	Cordillera de la Ramada			Argentina
6,488	El Muerto		27°03′26″S 68°29′02″W		Argentina – Chile
6,471	Del Veladero		27°55′S 68°55′W		Argentina
6,438	Illimani	Cordillera Real	16°39′14″S 67°47′05″W		Bolivia
6,437	Antofalla	Puna de Atacama	25.53°S 68.00°W		Argentina
6,436	Cerro del Nacimiento	Cordillera de la Ramada	27°14′S 68°30′W		Argentina
6,427	Ancohuma	Cordillera Real	15°51′12″S 68°32′27″W		Bolivia
6,425	Coropuna	Cordillera Ampato	15°31′00″S 72°39′00″W		Peru
6,414	El Cóndor	Puna de Atacama	26°38′S 68°22′W		Argentina
6,395	Huandoy	Cordillera Blanca	9°1′41″S 77°39′50″W		Peru
6,380	Ausangate	Cordillera Vilcanota	13°47′19″S 71°13′52″W		Peru
6,380	Cachi		24°55′54.3″S 66°23′27.2″W		Argentina
6,369	Huantsán	Cordillera Blanca	09°30′53″S 77°18′37″W		Peru
6,368	Illampu	Cordillera Real	15°49′S 68°34′W		Bolivia
6,345	Chopicalqui	Cordillera Blanca	09°05′12″S 77°34′26″W		Peru
6,344	Siula Grande	Cordillera Huayhuash	10°17′41″S 76°53′28″W		Peru
6,342	Parinacota	Cordillera Occidental	18°09′59″S 69°08′35″W		Bolivia – Chile
6,335	Reclus	Puna de Atacama			Argentina
6,093	Solimana	Cordillera Ampato	15°24′36″S 72°53′35″W		Peru
6,310	Ampato	Cordillera Ampato	15°49′18″S 71°52′45″W		Peru
6,309	Chinchey	Cordillera Blanca	09°22′47″S 77°19′33″W		Peru
6,282	Pomerape	Cordillera Occidental	18°07′41″S 69°07′44″W		Bolivia – Chile
6,280	Majadita				Argentina – Chile
6,274	Palcaraju	Cordillera Blanca	09°22′05″S 77°22′13″W		Peru
6,271	Salcantay				Peru
6,267	Chimborazo	Cordillera Occidental	01°28′S 78°48′W		Ecuador
6,259	Santa Cruz	Cordillera Blanca	08°53′39″S 77°42′30″W		Peru
6,239	Los Patos		27°18′04″S 68°48′31″W		Argentina - Chile
6,233	Pular	Puna de Atacama	24°11′42″S 68°03′31″W		Chile
6,216	Olivares	Principal Cordillera	30°17′54″S 69°54′04″W		Argentina – Chile
6,205	Cerro Solo	Puna de Atacama	27°06′15″S 68°42′47″W		Argentina - Chile
6,200	Ramada	Cordillera de la Ramada	22°12′S 66°37′W		Argentina – Chile
6,188	Copa	Cordillera Blanca			Peru
6,184	Cerro Quemado	Puna de Atacama			Argentina
6,176	Aucanquilcha		21°13′15″S 68°28′06″W		Chile
6,168	El Toro		29°07′46″S 69°07′58″W		Argentina – Chile
6,162	Ranrapalca	Cordillera Blanca	9°24′40″S 77°25′00″W		Peru
6,160	Las Tórtolas		29°56′S 69°54′W		Argentina – Chile
6,157	Cerro La Mesa	Cordillera de la Ramada	32°03′51″S 70°06′52″W		Argentina
6,152	Cumbre del Laudo				Argentina
6,148	Alto San Juan		33°28′07″S 69°48′54″W		Argentina - Chile
6,148	Nevado de Palermo		24°45′57.6″S 66°24′43.7″W		Argentina
6,147	Pucaranra	Cordillera Blanca	9°23′30″S 77°21′3″W		Peru
6,146	El Ermitaño		26°47′13″S 68°36′12″W		Chile
6,145	San Pedro		21°53′27″S 68°23′36″W		Chile
6,130	Queva		24°18′29.9″S 66°43′55.6″W		Argentina
6,127	Chearoco	Cordillera Real	15°57′0″S 68°24′56″W		Bolivia
6,127	Sierra Nevada de Lagunas Bravas	Puna de Atacama	26°29′37″S 68°35′09″W		Argentina – Chile
6,122	Hualcán	Cordillera Blanca	9°12′11″S 77°31′5″W		Peru
6,119	Barrancas Blancas		26°59′37″S 68°40′04″W		Chile
6,110	Alma Negra	Cordillera de la Ramada			Argentina
6,110	Callangate	Cordillera Vilcanota	13°43′54″S 71°09′33″W		Peru
6,110	Juncal	Principal Cordillera	33°03′06″S 70°05′41″W		Argentina – Chile
6,108	Chacraraju	Cordillera Blanca	8°59′36″S 77°36′54″W		Peru
6,108	Marmolejo	Principal Cordillera	33°44′03″S 69°52′40″W		Argentina – Chile
6,106	Chumpe	Cordillera Vilcanota	13°43′32″S 71°4′53″W		Peru
6,102	Alcamarinayoc	Cordillera Vilcanota	13°41′59″S 71°5′41″W		Peru
6,100	Pico Polacos	Cordillera de la Ramada			Argentina
6,095	Volcán Aracar		24°17′24.4″S 67°46′59.8″W		Argentina
6,093	Jatunhuma	Cordillera Vilcanota	13°44′50″S 71°8′12″W		Peru
6,092	San Pablo		21°53′12″S 68°20′41″W		Chile
6,088	Huayna Potosí	Cordillera Real	16°16′S 68°01′W		Bolivia
6,080	Cerro Colorados		26°10.4′S 68°22.5′W		Chile
6,075	Chachani		16°11′29″S 71°31′47″W		Peru
6,074	Chachacomani	Cordillera Real			Bolivia
6,071	Guallatiri		18°25′26″S 69°05′25″W		Chile
6,070	El Plomo		33°06′10″S 70°03′18″W		Argentina - Chile
6,067	Vicuñas		27°01′29″S 68°36′53″W		Chile
6,052	Acotango		18°23′00″S 69°02′52″W		Bolivia – Chile
6,052	Copiapó		27°18′30″S 69°07′58″W		Chile
6,051	Socompa		24°23′45.7″S 68°14′43.6″W		Argentina – Chile
6,049	Yayamari	Cordillera Vilcanota	13°46′00″S 70°58′54″W		Peru
6,046	Acamarachi		23°18′S 67°37′W		Chile
6,046	Pucajirca	Cordillera Blanca	8°50′59″S 77°35′43″W		Peru
6,040	Chaupi Orco	Apolobamba	14°27′S 69°05′W		Bolivia - Peru
6,040	El Fraile		27°02′55″S 68°22′46″W		Chile
6,040	Quitaraju	Cordillera Blanca	8°53′41″S 77°39′46″W		Peru
6,034	Tocllaraju	Cordillera Blanca	9°20′50″S 77°23′49″W		Peru
6,030	Ciénaga Grande				Argentina
6,030	Peña Blanca	Puna de Atacama	26°49′32″S 68°38′58″W		Chile
6,029	Salín		24°19′41.4″S 68°03′58.7″W		Argentina – Chile
6,028	Calinga				Argentina
6,025	Artesonraju	Cordillera Blanca	8°57′S 77°38′W		Peru
6,025	Caraz	Cordillera Blanca	8°58′4″S 77°40′8″W		Peru
6,025	Hualca Hualca	Cordillera Ampato	15°43′14″S 71°51′36″W		Peru
6,023	Palpana				Chile
6,019	Piquenes		33°30′51″S 69°50′07″W		Chile
6,018	San Francisco		26°55′06″S 68°15′47″W		Argentina – Chile
6,008	Uturunku		22°15′44″S 67°10′38″W		Bolivia
5,991	Pumasillo	Cordillera Vilcabamba	13°14′57″S 72°49′9″W		Peru
5,990	Capurata		18°24′54″S 69°02′45″W		Chile - Bolivia
5,988	Tacora		17°43′S 69°46′W		Chile
5,982	Sillajhuay		19°44′32″S 68°41′26″W		Chile - Bolivia
5,976	Sabancaya	Cordillera Ampato	15°47′18″S 71°51′23″W		Peru
5,971	Sairecabur		22°43′0″S 67°53′30″W		Chile
5,954	Contrahierbas	Cordillera Blanca	9°6′22″S 77°29′25″W		Peru
5,947	Alpamayo	Cordillera Blanca	8°56′S 77°42′W		Peru
5,929	Lípez	Cordillera de Lípez	21°53′S 66°52′W		Bolivia
5,920	Licancabur		22°50′S 67°53′W		Bolivia – Chile
5,910	Miñiques				Chile
5,900	Huila Aje	Cordillera Vilcanota	13°47′7″S 70°58′10″W		Peru
5,897	Cotopaxi		00°40′S 78°26′W		Ecuador
5,897	Ticlla		12°15′23″S 75°57′24″W		Peru
5,896	Chañi		24°03′46.4″S 65°44′46.2″W		Argentina
5,888	Ocshapalca	Cordillera Blanca	9°24′30″S 77°26′05″W		Peru
5,885	Pirámide	Cordillera Blanca	8°58′31″S 77°37′14″W		Peru
5,880	Jotabeche				Chile
5,874	Calzada	Cordillera Real	15°55′57″S 68°26′16″W		Bolivia
5,870	Rondoy	Cordillera Huayhuash	10°13′19″S 76°54′50″W		Peru
5,869	Mururata	Cordillera Real			Bolivia
5,863	Ollagüe				Bolivia – Chile
5,856	San José		33°47′08″S 69°53′35″W		Argentina – Chile
5,845	Japu Punta	Cordillera Vilcanota	13°45′21″S 71°00′17″W		Peru
5,830	Taulliraju	Cordillera Blanca	8°53′33″S 77°34′45″W		Peru
5,828	Q'asiri	Cordillera Real	15°54′S 68°30′W		Bolivia
5,821	Misti		16°17′40″S 71°24′32″W		Peru
5,818	Sahuasiray	Cordillera Urubamba	13°12′50″S 71°59′18″W		Peru
5,815	Tutupaca		17°1′35″S 70°22′18″W		Peru
5,812	Jatunñaño Punta	Cordillera Vilcanota	13°45′7″S 71°2′14″W		Peru
5,810	Rinrijirca	Cordillera Blanca	8°53′40″S 77°36′39″W		Peru
5,808	Tocorpuri				Bolivia – Chile
5,805	Chupiquiña		16°39′56″S 69°47′58″W		Chile - Peru
5,800	Jachacunocollo	Kimsa Cruz	16°58′S 67°20′W		Bolivia
5,796	Huanacuni	Apolobamba	14°51′S 69°10′W		Bolivia
5,790	Cayambe	Cordillera Real			Ecuador
5,787	Tullparaju	Cordillera Blanca	9°24′S 77°19′W		Peru
5,780	Allincapac	Cordillera Carabaya	13°54′29″S 70°24′56″W		Peru
5,780	Condoriquiña	Cordillera Vilcanota	13°49′30″S 70°55′1″W		Peru
5,780	Llongote		12°19′45″S 75°56′53″W		Peru
5,771	Padreyoc	Cordillera Vilcabamba	13°22′42″S 72°44′23″W		Peru
5,763	Cerro de La Isla				Chile
5,762	Kunturiri	Cordillera Occidental	18°02′30″S 69°04′28″W		Bolivia
5,761	Aguas Blancas				Argentina – Chile
5,756	Nevados de Poquis				Chile
5,754	Arizaro		24°25′01.6″S 67°59′15.5″W		Argentina
5,752	Pisco	Cordillera Blanca			Peru
5,750	Acay		24°25′01.7″S 66°09′38.7″W		Argentina
5,750	Pariacaca	Cordillera Pariacaca	11°59′30″S 75°59′30″W		Peru
5,743	Joyllor Puñuna	Cordillera Vilcanota	13°55′44″S 70°49′1″W		Peru
5,741	Cerro Barroso				Peru
5,735	Champara	Cordillera Blanca	8°41′14″S 77°46′52″W		Peru
5,730	Tunshu	Cordillera Pariacaca	11°53′35″S 75°59′1″W		Peru
5,728	Paruma				Bolivia – Chile
5,722	Uruashraju	Cordillera Blanca	9°34′46″S 77°18′30″W		Peru
5,721	Huaynaccapac	Cordillera Carabaya	13°53′50″S 70°24′56″W		Peru
5,717	Umurata	Cordillera Occidental	18°21′20″S 69°2′59″W		Bolivia - Chile
5,716	Cashán	Cordillera Blanca	9°33′26″S 77°21′20″W		Peru
5,704	Antisana				Ecuador
5,703	Shacsha	Cordillera Blanca	9°35′8″S 77°22′8″W		Peru
5,697	Lastarria o Azufre		25°10′06.1″S 68°30′25.2″W		Argentina - Chile
5,690	Doña Ana				Chile
5,690	Achacollo		17°33′48″S 69°52′15″W		Peru
5,688	Araral				Bolivia – Chile
5,688	Mururaju	Cordillera Blanca	9°48′27″S 77°14′38″W		Peru
5,686	Vallunaraju	Cordillera Blanca	9°25′20″S 77°27′23″W		Peru
5,682	Caullaraju	Cordillera Blanca	9°57′45″S 77°15′36″W		Peru
5,682	Veronica	Urubamba	13°9′51″S 72°19′33″W		Peru
5,681	Muruq'u		21°51′55″S 66°36′22″W		Bolivia
5,680	León Jiwata	Kimsa Cruz			Bolivia
5,679	Machu Such'i Qhuchi	Apolobamba	14°45′S 69°12′W		Bolivia
5,676	Nelly	Cordillera Occidental	22°41′55″S 67°45′17″W		Bolivia
5,676	Iñuma		17°27′38″S 69°50′18″W		Peru
5,664	Pichu Pichu				Peru
5,658	Colquepucro	Cordillera Pariacaca	11°58′22″S 76°1′20″W		Peru
5,654	Chila		15°24′23″S 72°9′59″W		Peru
5,650	Pumahuanca	Cordillera Urubamba	13°11′17″S 72°8′16″W		Peru
5,650	Casiri (Tacna)		17°28′00″S 69°48′48″W		Peru
5,648	Kunturiri	Cordillera Real	16°10′S 68°14′W		Bolivia
5,648	Zapaleri	Cordillera Central	22°48′00″S 67°10′00″W		Argentina – Bolivia – Chile
5,647	Casiri (Arequipa)		15°27′46″S 72°10′17″W		Peru
5,644	Huacshash	Huayhuash	10°24′50″S 76°58′30″W		Peru
5,640	Wayna Khunu Qullu	Kimsa Cruz			Bolivia
5,626	Inacaliri				Bolivia – Chile
5,622	Huacrish	Huayhuash	10°17′55″S 76°57′50″W		Peru
5,620	Inca		24°35′58.5″S 68°29′36.9″W		Argentina - Chile
5,617	Ulla Qhaya	Apolobamba	14°59′44″S 69°03′32″W		Bolivia
5,614	Chichicapac	Cordillera Carabaya	13°56′40″S 70°22′00″W		Peru
5,610	Linzor				Chile
5,604	Warawarani	Cordillera Real	16°03′44″S 68°21′12″W		Bolivia
5,600	Jatuncunca	Cordillera Blanca	9°24′37″S 77°27′01″W		Peru
5,600	Hualipayoc	Cordillera Vilcanota	13°41′3″S 71°7′33″W		Peru
5,597	Mismi		15°31′31″S 71°41′27″W		Peru
5,596	Wila Lluxi	Cordillera Real	16°4′29″S 68°20′23″W		Bolivia
5,594	Cerro Rincón		24°01′50.3″S 67°19′17.9″W		Argentina - Chile
5,590	Archibarca		25°14′16″S 67°51′54″W		Argentina
5,589	Paqu Kiwuta	Cordillera Real	16°5′17″S 68°20′44″W		Bolivia
5,585	Nevado de Castillo, Nevado General Güemes o Piedra Sonada		24°21′49.9″S 65°39′21.3″W		Argentina
5,570	Copap - Perlilla	Cordillera Blanca	9°17′S 77°20′W		Peru
5,567	Huancune		17°35′43″S 69°47′21″W		Peru
5,566	Yaypuri	Kimsa Cruz			Bolivia
5,560	Auxilio	Huayhuash	10°18′20″S 76°57′55″W		Peru
5,557	Huaytapallana	Huaytapallana			Peru
5,552	Lirima				Chile
5,550	Cóndor Tuco		13°50′57″S 71°8′7″W		Peru
5,550	Cuyoc	Huayhuash	10°23′9″S 76°52′31″W		Peru
5,550	Yanajaja	Cordillera Vilcanota	13°47′16″S 71°11′02″W		Peru
5,550	Yucamane		17°11′00″S 70°12′00″W		Peru
5,546	Sirk'i Qullu	Cordillera Real	16°23′S 67°52′W		Bolivia
5,540	Jach'a Waracha	Apolobamba			Bolivia
5,530	Chicón	Urubamba	13°14′12″S 72°3′22″W		Peru
5,522	Jolljepunco	Cordillera Vilcanota	13°31′9″S 71°12′24″W		Peru
5,520	Choquetacarpo	Vilcabamba	13°13′44″S 72°51′11″W		Peru
5,512	Janq'u Uyu	Cordillera Real	16°3′0″S 68°19′16″W		Bolivia
5,508	Jisk'a Pata	Cordillera Real	15°27′38″S 71°52′5″W		Bolivia
5,507	Carhuachuco	Paryaqaqa	11°51′8″S 76°3′18″W		Peru
5,506	Surihuiri		15°27′38″S 71°52′5″W		Peru
5,505	Sara Sara		15°19′46″S 73°26′41″W		Peru
5,500	Macón		24°27′56″S 67°15′17.5″W		Argentina
5,500	Jacabamba	Cordillera Blanca	9°19′19″S 77°19′15″W		Peru
5,500	Pajonal				Argentina
5,500	Carhuascancha	Cordillera Blanca	9°29′10″S 77°19′19″W		Peru
5,500	Tacune		16°28′4″S 71°8′15″W		Peru
5,500	Huallacancha	Pariacaca	11°52′12″S 76°2′40″W		Peru
5,493	Churup	Cordillera Blanca	9°28′5″S 77°24′56″W		Peru
5,490	Uqi Uqini	Cordillera Occidental	18°19′S 69°2′W		Bolivia - Chile
5,489	Chimboya	La Raya	14°26′37″S 70°57′44″W		Peru
5,487	Challhua	Cordillera Blanca	9°55′15″S 77°13′23″W		Peru
5,480	Mellado		24°41′02.2″S 68°13′52.1″W		Argentina
5,479	Tuco	Cordillera Blanca	9°55′45″S 77°12′18″W		Peru
5,477	Rajuntay	Cordillera La Viuda	11°32′28.59″S 76°14′46.91″W		Peru
5,471	Cinajara		13°31′42″S 71°14′1″W		Peru
5,470	Huallanca	Huallanca	9°55′00″S 77°2′20″W		Peru
5,465	Pumarinri		10°24′23″S 76°52′40″W		Peru
5,465	Qala Phusa	Apolobamba	14°53′14″S 69°06′54″W		Bolivia
5,464	Huayanay	Vilcabamba	13°17′54″S 72°23′35″W		Peru
5,463	Huayna Cotoni		12°16′2″S 75°59′4″W		Peru
5,460	Janq'u Qullu	Kimsa Cruz			Bolivia
5,460	Yanapaccha	Cordillera Blanca	9°1′35″S 77°34′37″W		Peru
5,453	Coruña		17°29′15″S 69°51′14″W		Peru
5,445	Aqupallqa		12°13′27″S 75°59′28″W		Peru
5,442	Kimsachata		13°39′36″S 71°2′47″W		Peru
5,434	Huamashraju	Cordillera Blanca	9°31′30″S 77°23′6″W		Peru
5,427	Rajucollota	Huayhuash	10°17′50″S 76°58′50″W		Peru
5,425	Pisacani		17°16′36.5″S 69°56′17″W		Peru
5,424	El Plomo		33°13′58″S 70°12′44″W		Chile
5,424	Jach'a Pata	Cordillera Real	16°03′26″S 68°20′31″W		Bolivia
5,421	Chacaltaya	Cordillera Real			Bolivia
4,421	Jathi Qullu	Cordillera Real	16°25′54″S 67°56′29″W		Bolivia
5,420	Cunurana		14°32′56″S 70°49′55″W		Peru
5,420	Paño		24°13′48.2″S 65°41′50.3″W		Argentina
5,419	Waracha	Apolobamba	14°52′14″S 69°04′40″W		Bolivia
5,416	Nasa Q'ara	Cordillera Real	16°08′03″S 68°17′33″W		Bolivia
5,412	Chuska		26°08′56″S 66°13′50.6″W		Argentina
5,410	Ritacuba Blanco	Cordillera Oriental	06°29′39″N 72°17′51″W		Colombia
5,408	Ticsani		16°46′3″S 70°35′59″W		Peru
5,407	Ullqa	Cordillera Occidental			Bolivia – Chile
5,407	Pukintika	Cordillera Occidental	18°44′S 68°59′W		Bolivia - Chile
5,404	Corihuayrachina	Vilcabamba	13°21′06″S 72°49′15″W		Peru
5,401	Cerro Bayo		25°25′S 68°35′W		Chile
5,400	Chapi		13°37′42″S 69°20′51″W		Peru
5,400	Pachanqutu	Paryaqaqa	11°54′42″S 76°3′16″W		Peru
5,400	Pucagaga Punta	Cordillera Blanca	9°27′20″S 77°24′14″W		Peru
5,400	Qillqa		14°22′1″S 71°00′42″W		Peru
5,400	Q'umirqucha		13°49′6″S 71°7′31″W		Peru
5,400	Huasacocha	Cordillera Vilcanota	13°50′39″S 71°17′55″W		Peru
5,400	Wayllakancha	Paryaqaqa	11°53′24″S 76°2′33″W		Peru
5,399	Sirihuani	Urubamba	13°11′57″S 72°2′39″W		Peru
5,380	Phaq'u Q'awa	Cordillera Occidental	18°05′30″S 69°04′08″W		Bolivia
5,379	Kuntursinqa		10°29′18″S 76°44′32″W		Peru
5,368	Mullu Apachita	Cordillera Real	16°03′52″S 68°17′20″W		Bolivia
5,365	Huacaypaca		11°56′10″S 76°8′27″W		Peru
5,364	Huila	Cordillera Central	2°55′36″N 76°1′56″W		Colombia
5,358	Jach'a T'uxu	Cordillera Real	16°01′08″S 68°25′26″W		Bolivia
5,350	Ch'amak Qullu	Kimsa Cruz			Bolivia
5,350	Rit'ipata	Apolobamba	14°37′11″S 69°21′34″W		Peru
5,350	Tukumach'ay	Paryaqaqa	11°55′9″S 75°58′33″W		Peru
5,350	Wila Kunka		13°53′49″S 70°26′47″W		Peru
5,342	Mik'aya	Cordillera Real	16°21′59″S 67°56′09″W		Bolivia
5,338	Kikash		10°3′16″S 77°6′00″W		Peru
5,337	Diamante		25°47′32.5″S 66°50′57.4″W		Argentina
5,336	Pomabamba	Cordillera Blanca	9°17′33″S 77°22′16″W		Peru
5,336	Wallatani	Cordillera Real	17°00′39″S 67°21′41″W		Bolivia
5,326	Jach'a Kunturiri	Cordillera Occidental	17°59′S 68°59′W		Bolivia
5,321	Nevado del Ruiz	Cordillera Central	04°53′43″N 75°19′21″W		Colombia
5,321	Wak'ani	Cordillera Real	16°20′59″S 67°56′39″W		Bolivia
5,320	El Altar	Cordillera Real	1°40′S 78°25′W		Ecuador
5,320	Pukasaya		16°27′33″S 70°56′10″W		Peru
5,313	Cerro Bravo Alto				Chile
5,312	Quri Ch'uma	Kimsa Cruz			Bolivia
5,308	Silla		24°47′27.4″S 68°33′58.9″W		Argentina
5,304	Sitaq		12°48′7″S 75°14′8″W		Peru
5,300	Chuquiananta		17°4′53″S 70°26′58″W		Peru
5,300	Chiarjaque		17°6′32″S 70°12′46″W		Peru
5,300	Aquichua		13°40′32″S 70°59′00″W		Peru
5,300	Millpu		10°27′46″S 76°51′13″W		Peru
5,300	Pumani		17°4′13″S 70°28′18″W		Peru
5,300	Putka	Paryaqaqa	11°49′46″S 76°2′47″W		Peru
5,300	Wachwa		11°38′57″S 76°19′21″W		Peru
5,300	Wayrakancha		11°41′25″S 76°11′49″W		Peru
5,298	Jach'a Qullu	Cordillera Real	16°02′41″S 68°23′22″W		Bolivia
5,290	Waqullani		15°56′3″S 71°30′53″W		Peru
5,286	Chequiaraju	Cordillera Blanca	9°10′19″S 77°33′29″W		Peru
5,286	Pilanco	Cordillera Blanca	8°47′59″S 77°41′18″W		Peru
5,281	Mama Uqllu	Kimsa Cruz			Bolivia
5,280	K'isi K'isini	Cordillera Occidental	18°14′S 69°4′W		Bolivia
5,264	Tultul		24°11′30.7″S 67°06′25.8″W		Argentina
5,263	Iliniza Sur				Ecuador
5,260	Churi Laq'a		16°47′23″S 70°21′15″W		Peru
5,254	Rima Rima	Cordillera Blanca	9°28′S 77°27′W		Peru
5,237	Yanamarey	Cordillera Blanca	9°39′40″S 77°15′40″W		Peru
5,230	Sangay		2.0°S 78.33°W		Ecuador
5,224	Q'asiri	Cordillera Real	16°26′40″S 67°56′15″W		Bolivia
5,223	Juqhuri		17°19′28″S 69°41′25″W		Peru
5,220	Tolima	Cordillera Central	04°40′N 75°20′W		Colombia
5,214	Jatun Wila Qullu		19°24′7″S 66°34′35″W		Bolivia
5,200	Chumpi		11°44′00″S 76°2′30″W		Peru
5,200	Churu	Cordillera Real	16°32′40″S 67°50′26″W		Bolivia
5,200	Cosapilla				Chile
5,200	Kunka		14°27′40″S 70°59′00″W		Peru
5,200	Kunturi		16°12′48″S 71°8′50″W		Peru
5,200	Kunturkhacha		15°15′39″S 72°10′14″W		Peru
5,200	Laram Pukara	Cordillera Occidental	18°53′59″S 68°49′10″W		Bolivia
5,200	Llusk'a Rit'i (Cusco-Puno)		13°43′31″S 70°43′55″W		Peru
5,200	Machu Rit'i		13°47′40″S 70°37′14″W		Peru
5,200	Muru Muruni		14°1′59″S 70°9′58″W		Peru
5,200	Pumaqulluni		14°3′40″S 70°12′20″W		Peru
5,200	Qillqata		16°29′55″S 71°00′46.5″W		Peru
5,200	Jori Pintay		13°43′53″S 70°43′19″W		Peru
5,200	Rit'i Urmasqa		14°38′45″S 69°17′15″W		Peru
5,200	Taruka Sayana		13°44′51″S 71°41′50″W		Peru
5,200	Ukhu	Paryaqaqa	11°47′16″S 76°3′47″W		Peru
5,200	Warawarani		17°25′19″S 69°39′44″W		Peru
5,198	Ancasmarca	Cordillera Urubamba	13°15′6″S 71°59′7″W		Peru
5,192	Jach'a Juqhu	Cordillera Real	16°02′18″S 68°22′53″W		Bolivia
5,182	P'aqu Urqu		21°48′00″S 66°39′33″W		Bolivia
5,181	Coñocranra	Cordillera Negra	8°56′S 77°42′W		Peru
5,176	Quysupakana	Cordillera Vilcabamba	13°20′00″S 73°3′00″W		Peru
5,167	Chiqllarasu		13°22′33″S 74°38′18″W		Peru
5,163	Irruputuncu	Cordillera Occidental	20°44′S 68°33′W		Bolivia– Chile
5,162	Yanashallash	Wallanka	9°52′25″S 77°3′35″W		Peru
5,156	Huamanchoque	Cordillera Urubamba	13°15′25″S 72°00′42″W		Peru
5,152	Choquesafra	Cordillera Vilcabamba	13°13′34″S 73°12′49″W		Peru
5,145	Napa				Bolivia – Chile
5,140	Láscar		23°57′S 67°53′W		Chile
5,118	Pacra	Cordillera Blanca	8°25′23″S 77°50′33″W		Peru
5,116	Carihuairazo	Cordillera Real			Ecuador
5,112	Ccarhuarazo		14°19′55″S 73°45′25″W		Peru
5,106	Malcante		25°04′29.8″S 65°51′05.8″W		Argentina
5,100	Anka Wachana	Willkanuta	13°31′06″S 71°07′07″W		Peru
5,100	Minasniyuq		13°28′54″S 71°15′53″W		Peru
5,100	Riticocha		14°45′52″S 70°34′25″W		Peru
5,100	Urus	Cordillera Blanca	9°21′17″S 77°25′33″W		Peru
5,084	Uyuni		20°00′S 66°35′W		Bolivia
5,082	Cerro Ratones		25°14′33.4″S 66°52′47.2″W		Argentina
5,076	Chunkarani		18°08′15″S 68°28′15″W		Bolivia
5,076	Qala T'uxu	Cordillera Real	16°04′11″S 68°22′19″W		Bolivia
5,075	Wanq'uri		17°7′44″S 69°40′53″W		Peru
5,073	Qarwapunta	Cordillera Negra			Peru
5,072	Sirk'i		17°21′S 69°24′W		Bolivia
5,071	Khunurana	Potosí mountain range	19°48′S 65°39′W		Bolivia
5,070	Doña Inés				Chile
5,050	T'illu	Waytapallana	11°49′15″S 75°5′27″W		Peru
5,044	Capacsaya	Cordillera Urubamba	13°11′20″S 72°6′42″W		Peru
5,038	Piqa				Bolivia – Chile
5,028	Cerro Negro (La Caldera)		24°24′56.5″S 65°36′02.3″W		Argentina
5,026	Cerro Negro (Santa Victoria)		22°08′48.3″S 65°11′35.9″W		Argentina
5,025	Pucaraju	Cordillera Blanca	8°55′49″S 77°32′39″W		Peru
5,024	Cerro Tapado				Chile
5,023	Jatun Q'asa	Khari Khari	19°43′S 65°39′W		Bolivia
5,023	Tungurahua	Cordillera Real	1°28′S 78°26′W		Ecuador
5,020	Pocitos		24°15′25.8″S 66°59′14.1″W		Argentina
5,020	Kimsa Kunturiri	Khari Khari	19°35′S 65°40′W		Bolivia
5,020	Q'umir Qucha	Potosí mountain range	19°48′S 65°39′W		Bolivia
5,015	Azul Casa		22°30′55.1″S 65°20′27.8″W		Argentina
5,006	Yaritani		18°08′37″S 68°21′00″W		Bolivia
5,000	Chullumpirini		14°00′29″S 70°10′58″W		Peru
5,000	Chulluncani		21°33′47″S 67°51′20″W		Bolivia
5,000	Llallawa		17°3′54″S 69°32′42″W		Peru
5,000	Qiwllaqucha		10°30′11″S 76°00′42″W		Peru
5,000	Wisk'achani		13°36′16″S 70°46′29″W		Peru
4,999	Risco Plateado		34°55′06″S 69°59′39″W		Argentina
4,981	Pico Bolívar	Sierra Nevada	8°35′N 71°2′W		Venezuela
4,968	Asu Asuni	Cordillera Occidental	18°13′S 68°31′W		Bolivia
4,965	Santa Isabel	Cordillera Central	04°49′N 75°22′W		Colombia
4,960	Q'illu Urqu	Potosí mountain range	19°39′54″S 65°40′13″W		Bolivia
4,948	Wila Qullu	Cordillera Occidental	20°20′S 68°39′W		Bolivia
4,944	Cotacachi	Cordillera Occidental	00°21′39″N 78°20′57″W		Ecuador
4,942	Pico Humboldt	Sierra Nevada			Venezuela
4,923	Waylla	Cordillera Occidental	20°22′S 68°44′W		Bolivia - Chile
4,922	Pico La Concha	Sierra Nevada			Venezuela
4,920	Wila Pukarani		19°19′50″S 68°18′35″W		Bolivia
4,916	Qullqi		15°8′20″S 70°29′52″W		Peru
4,900	Quenuaorco	Cordillera Vilcabamba	13°10′39″S 73°00′38″W		Peru
4,880	Pico Espejo	Sierra Nevada			Venezuela
4,850	El Palomo		34°36′28″S 70°17′42″W		Chile
4,843	Cerro Pasto Salado		30°00′39″S 070°11′29″W		Chile
4,842	Pachatusan		13°31′10″S 71°46′50″W		Peru
4,809	Qhapiya		16°19′52″S 69°8′32″W		Peru
4,800	Waytapallana		11°51′17″S 74°58′12″W		Peru
4,790	Corazón		00°32′17″S 78°41′15″W		Ecuador
4,787	Pichincha				Ecuador
4,764	Cumbal	Cordillera Occidental	0°56′56″N 77°53′17″W		Colombia
4,755	Pico El Toro	Cordillera de Mérida			Venezuela
4,750	Quindio	Cordillera Central	4°42′56″N 75°23′18″W		Colombia
4,748	Chiles	Cordillera Occidental			Colombia– Ecuador
4,740	Pico El León	Cordillera de Mérida			Venezuela
4,674	El Morado		33°43′33″S 70°03′45″W		Chile
4,646	Puracé		2°19′01″N 76°23′53″W		Colombia
4,609	Imbabura		0°15′29″N 78°10′47″W		Ecuador
4,580	Sotará	Cordillera Central	2°06′29″N 76°35′31″W		Colombia
4,463	Atacazo	Cordillera Occidental	0°21′10″S 78°37′01″W		Ecuador
4,445	Cerro Negro de Mayasquer	Cordillera Occidental			Colombia– Ecuador
4,380	Cerro Amaculla		21°01′S 68°52′W		Chile
4,276	Galeras	Cordillera Central	1°13′N 77°22′W		Colombia
4,260	Tinguiririca		34°48′S 70°20′W		Chile
4,160	Cerro El Mela	Sierras Pampeanas	28°52′02″S 67°07′37″W		Argentina
4,150	Doña Juana	Cordillera Central	01°28′N 76°49′W		Colombia
4,109	Cerro Mishahuanga		6°22′26″S 79°14′14″W		Peru
4,100	Farallones de Cali	Cordillera Occidental	03°30′29″N 76°41′45″W		Colombia
4,070	Azufral	Cordillera Occidental	01°05′00″N 77°43′00″W		Colombia
4,058	Monte San Valentín		46°35′42″S 73°20′45″W		Chile
4,018	Petacas		1°37′16″N 76°50′33″W		Colombia
4,018	Pico El Águila	Cordillera de Mérida			Venezuela
4,506	Cerro Chilinchilín		20°11′S 68°59′W		Chile
