= Pico El Toro =

Mountain in Venezuela

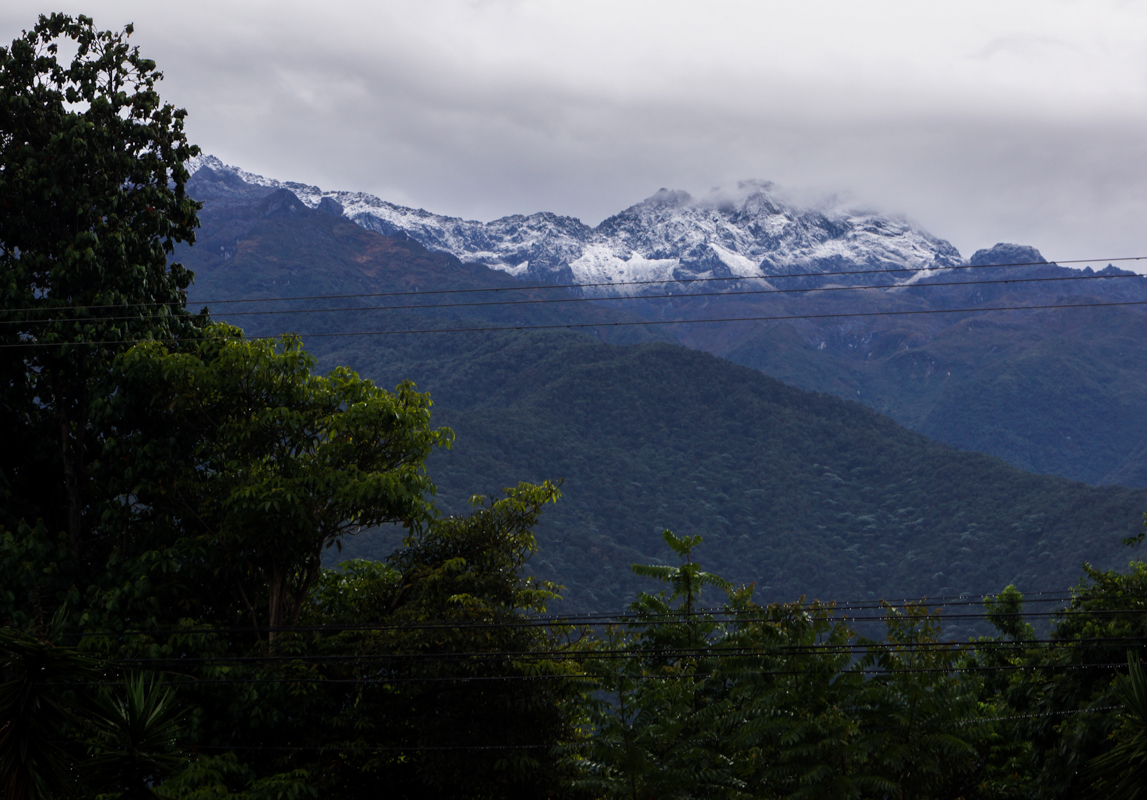
- Pico El Toro as seen from Mérida.

Highest point
- Elevation: 4,755 m (15,600 ft)
- Coordinates: 8°21′00″N 71°15′00″W

Geography
- Location: Mérida, Venezuela
- Parent range: Sierra Nevada, Andes

Climbing
- Easiest route: Loma Redonda and Los Nevados

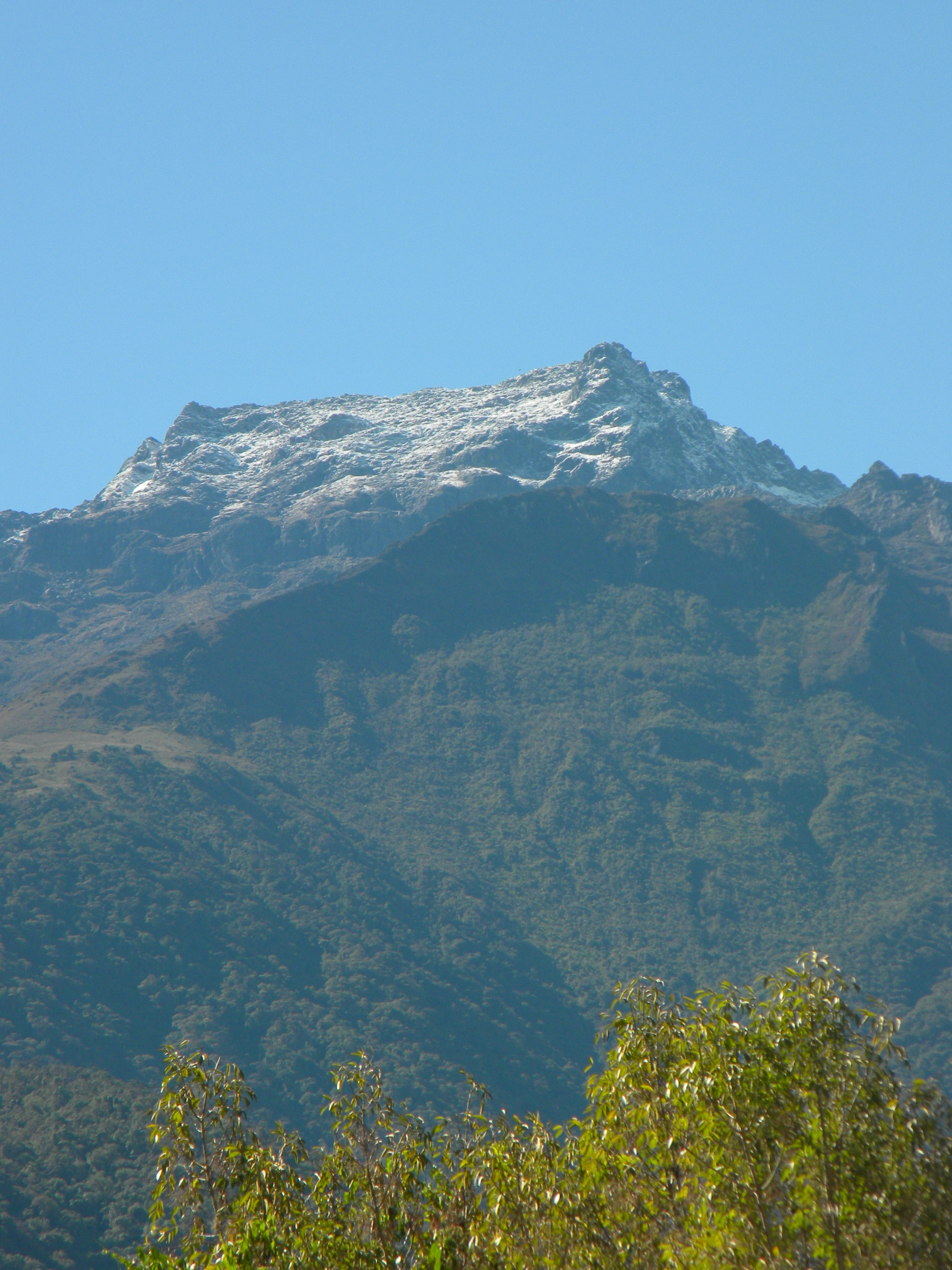
Merideños. “El Toro” Peak after a snowfall, seen from the “El Parque” area in the city of Mérida. This peak is located in the Sierra Nevada National Park and is one of the five white eagles of Venezuelan indigenous legend.

Pico El Toro is a mountain in the Andes of Venezuela. It has a height of 4,755 metres.

== See also ==
- List of mountains in the Andes
