= Nevado de Palermo =

Mountain in Argentina

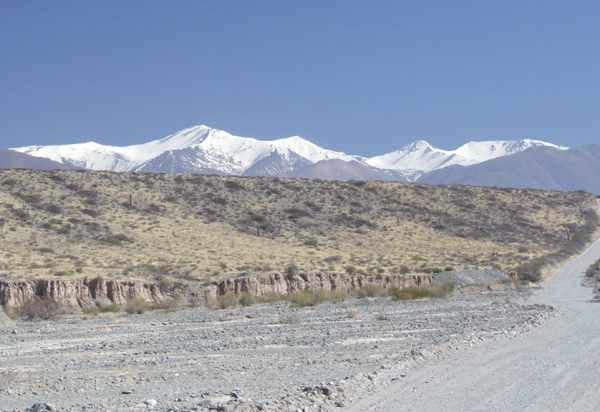
- Morro del Quemado and Cienaga seen from the road to the east.

Highest point
- Elevation: 6,184 m (20,289 ft)
- Prominence: 705 m (2,313 ft)
- Parent peak: Nevado de Cachi
- Coordinates: 24°49′55.92″S 066°24′18.36″W

Geography
- Location: Salta Province, Argentina
- Parent range: Sierra de Cachi

Climbing
- First ascent: 12/20/1975 - Enrique Pantaleón (Argentina)
- Easiest route: walk

Nevado de Palermo is a peak in Argentina (also sometimes known as Morro del Quemado) with an elevation of 6,184 metres (20,289 ft) metres. Palermo is one of the highest points of Sierra de Cachi. It is located within the territory of the Argentinean province of Salta, cities of Cachi and La Poma.

== First Ascent ==
Palermo was first climbed by Enrique Pantaleón (Argentina) December 20, 1975.

== Elevation ==
Other data from available digital elevation models: SRTM yields 6147 metres, ASTER 6179 metres and TanDEM-X 6195 metres. The height of the nearest key col is 5479 meters, leading to a topographic prominence of 705 meters. Palermo is considered a Mountain Subgroup according to the Dominance System and its dominance is 11.4%. Its parent peak is Nevado de Cachi and the Topographic isolation is 11.1 kilometers.

== See also ==
- List of mountains in the Andes
