= Cerro Laguna Blanca =

Mountain peak in Argentina

Laguna Blanca
- Location within Argentina

Highest point
- Elevation: 6,012 m (19,724 ft)
- Prominence: 1,777 metres (5,830 ft)
- Parent peak: Nevado de Cachi
- Coordinates: 26°31′48″S 67°03′33″W

Geography
- Parent range: Argentine Andes, Andes

Climbing
- First ascent: 07/12/2006 - Jaime Suarez (España), María Aguiar, Elsa Abrego, Adriana Agüero, Víctor Eduardo Carrizo, Norberto Cruz, Víctor Nieto, Juan Carlos Planas, Carlos Rodríguez Lastra and Aldo Vergara (Argentina)

Laguna Blanca is a peak in Argentina with an elevation of 6,012 metres (19,724 ft) metres. Laguna Blanca is the highest peak of Sierra de Laguna Blanca, a range within Puna de Atacama, a high plateau of the Andes. It is within the protected area "Natural Provincial Reserve and Biosphere of Laguna Blanca". Cerro Laguna Blanca is located within the territory of the Argentinean province of Catamarca. Its slopes are within the administrative boundaries of two Argentine cities: Antofagasta de la Sierra and Villa Vil.

== First Ascent ==
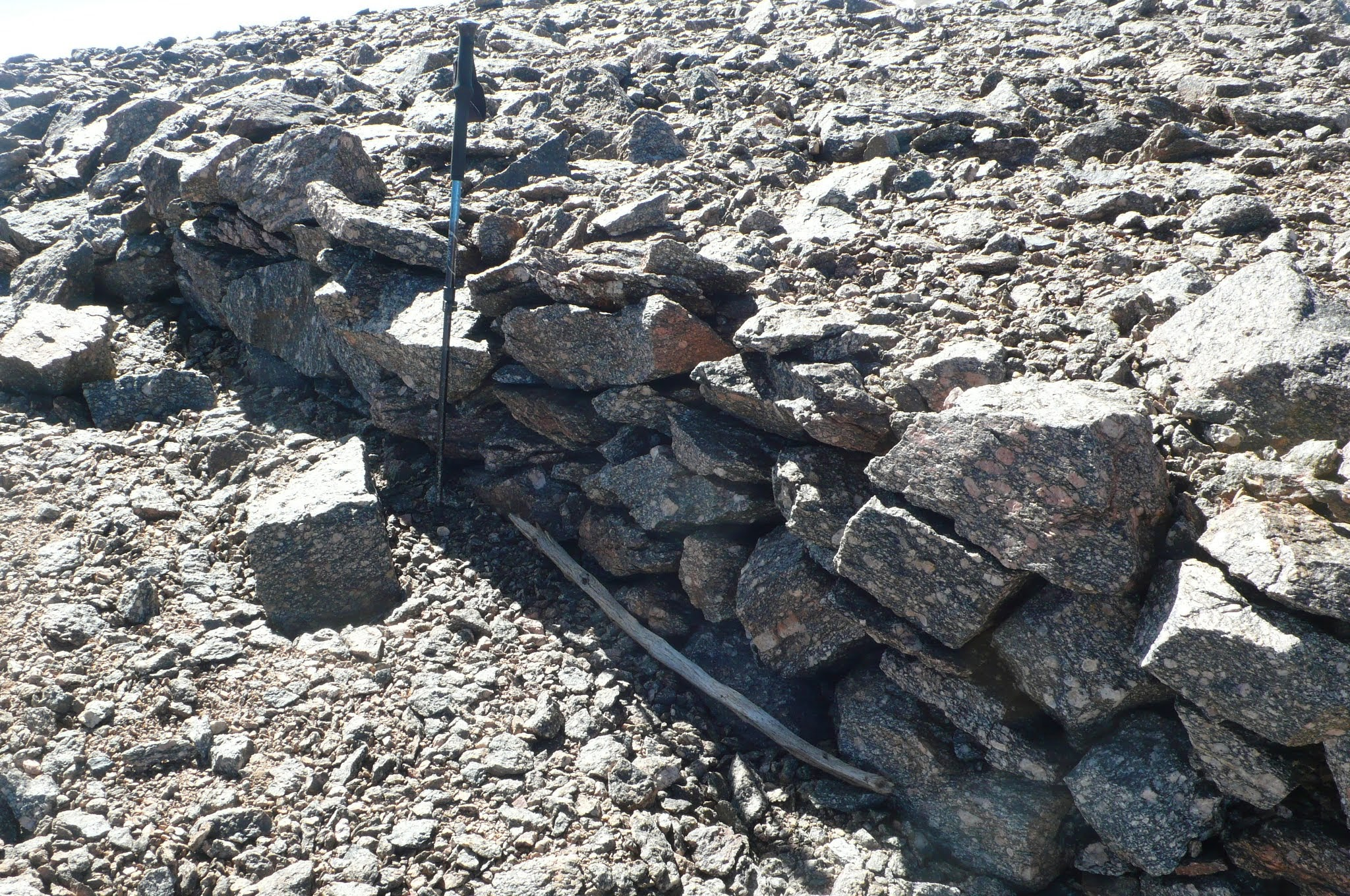

Although there is evidence of earlier ascents to the summit (probably incan), the first reported climb of Laguna Blanca was made by Jaime Suarez (España), María Aguiar, Elsa Abrego, Adriana Agüero, Víctor Eduardo Carrizo, Norberto Cruz, Víctor Nieto, Juan Carlos Planas, Carlos Rodríguez Lastra and Aldo Vergara (Argentina) on December 7, 2006.

== Elevation ==
Other data from available digital elevation models: SRTM yields 5995 metres, ASTER 6006 metres, ASTER filled 5995 metres, ALOS 6006 metres, TanDEM-X 6035 metres. The height of the nearest key col is 4235 meters, leading to a topographic prominence of 1777 meters. Laguna Blanca is considered a Mountain Range according to the Dominance System and its dominance is 29.56%. Its parent peak is Cachi and the Topographic isolation is 190 kilometers.
