= Pico El León =

Mountain in Venezuela

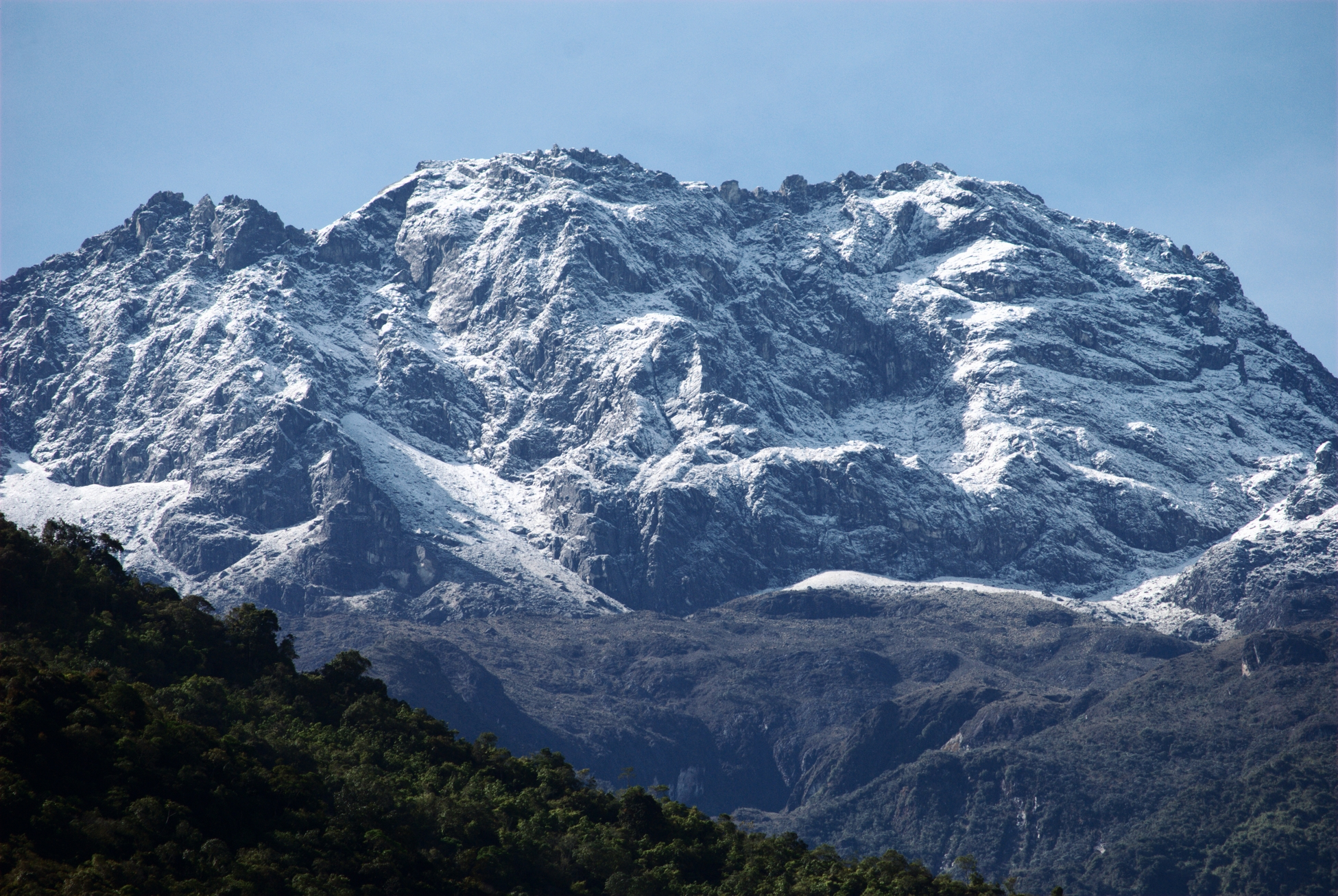
- Pico El León as seen from Mérida.

Highest point
- Elevation: 4,740 m (15,550 ft)
- Prominence: 257 m (843 ft)
- Coordinates: 8°30′37″N 71°06′03″W

Geography
- Location: Mérida, Venezuela
- Parent range: Sierra Nevada, Andes

Climbing
- Easiest route: Loma Redonda and Los Nevados

Pico El León is a mountain in the Andes of Venezuela. It has a height of 4740 metres.

== See also ==
- List of mountains in the Andes
