= Pico Bolívar =

Highest mountain in Venezuela

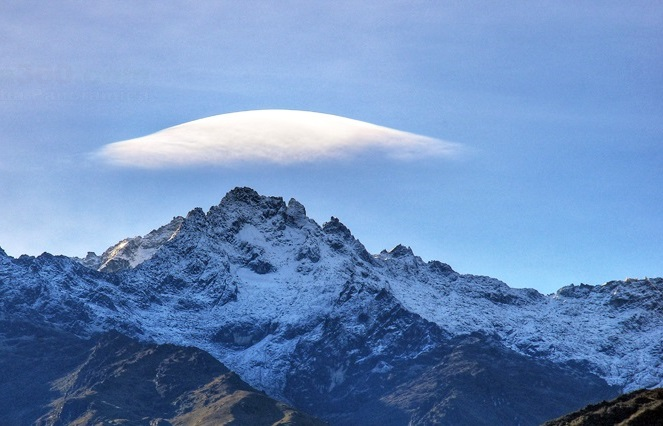
- Peak Bolívar during snow season

Highest point
- Elevation: 4,978 m (16,332 ft)
- Prominence: 3,957 m (12,982 ft); Ranked 25th
- Isolation: 261.74 km (162.64 mi)
- Listing: Country high point Ultra
- Coordinates: 08°32′30″N 71°02′45″W

Geography
- Location within Venezuela
- Location: Mérida, Mérida, Venezuela
- Parent range: Sierra Nevada, Andes

Climbing
- First ascent: 1935 by Enrique Bourgoin, H. Márquez Molina and Domingo Peña

Pico Bolívar is the highest mountain in Venezuela, at 4,978 metres (16,332 ft). Located in Mérida State. It can be reached only by walking; the Mérida cable car, which was the highest and longest cable car in the world when it was built, only reaches Pico Espejo. From there it is possible to climb to Pico Bolívar. The peak is named after the Venezuelan independence hero Simón Bolívar.

The Pico Bolívar is located on the mountain previously called La Columna, next to El León (4,743 m) and El Toro (4,695 m). The new name was suggested by Tulio Febres Cordero in 1925. It was officially renamed on December 30, 1934.

== Elevation ==
The height of this prominent Andean peak has been estimated and calculated various times during history. In 1912, one triangular measurement pointed at 5,002 metres (16,411 ft). In 1928 came another calculation at 5,007 metres (16,427 ft), which stood as official height for a long time.

During the 1990s, the scientists Heinz Saler and Carlos Abad calculated the height, based upon GPS observations to be 4,980.8 metres (16,341 ft). New GPS measurements were made in 2002, which stated a height of 4,978.4 ±0.4 metres. These more correct findings were published in 2005.

The final measurement was made by José Napoleón Hernández from IGVSB; Diego Deiros and Carlos Rodriguez from USB and two guides from Inparques. GPS measurements designed for geodetic network consists of the vertices Pico Bolívar, El Toro, Piedras Blancas, and Mucuñuque Observatory, the latter belonging to the Venezuelan Red Geocentric REGVEN. Measurements were temporally equally long and continuous to ensure a greater volume of data over time to make more consistent and reliable information, five (5) GPS dual frequency receivers were used.

Panoramic of Bolívar Peak. Ascent route Bourgoin - Peña

== Glacial retreat ==
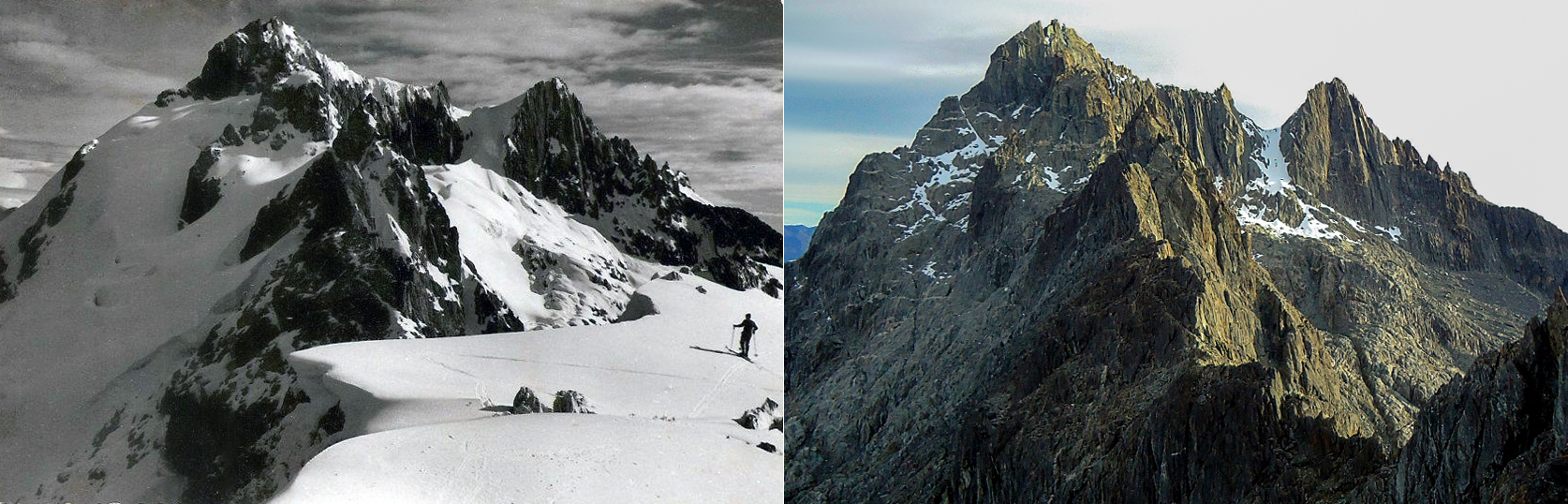
Comparison between the mountain's glacier, 1950 and 2011 respectively.

During the Merida glaciation in the Pleistocene epoch, the glaciated area had a maximum extent of 600 km^{2} and covered mountains with a height of at least 3,000 m (9,800 ft). At the end of the glaciation, the area covered by the glaciers progressively shrank, and before the start of the Little Ice Age they had possibly all disappeared.

It is estimated that in 1910 the area covered by glaciers was around 10 km^{2} (3.9 sq mi), divided in two large areas, one embracing Picos Bolívar, Espejo and Concha and the other embracing Picos Humboldt and Bonpland. Possibly a small glaciated area covered the northwest side of Pico El Toro.

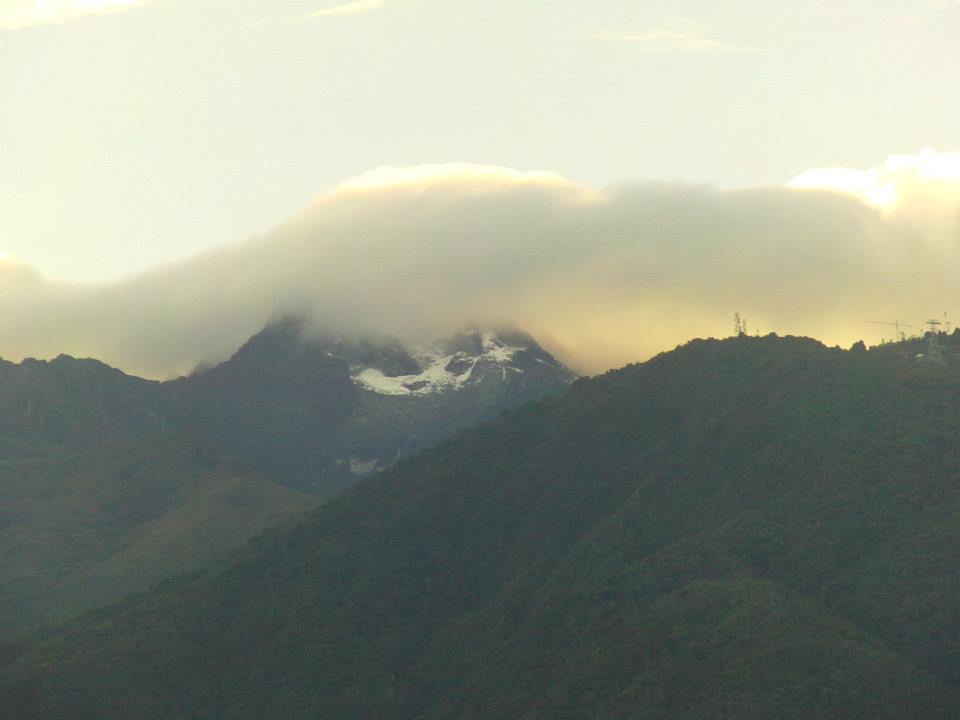
Pico Bolívar shrouded in clouds

Aerial pictures taken in 1952 show the glaciated area had already shrunk to 0.9 km^{2} (0.35 sq mi) for the Picos Bolívar, Espejo and Concha and to 2.0 km^{2} (0.77 sq mi) for the Picos Humboldt and Bonpland.

In 2003 almost all the glaciers of the area had disappeared, with the exception of two small glaciated areas (7.48 ha (18.5 acres) on Pico Bolívar and 35.81 ha (88.5 acres) on Pico Humboldt). By 2012, the glaciers on Pico Bolivar had disappeared, and by May 2024, the glaciers on Pico Humboldt disappeared as well, making Venezuela one of the first countries to lose all its glaciers.

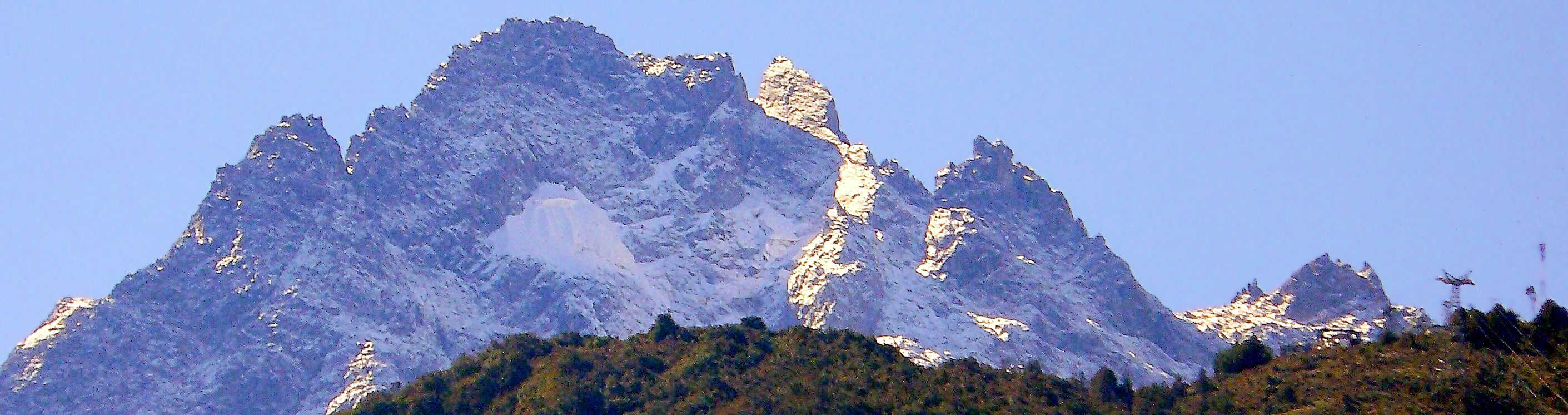
Panoramic view of Pico Bolívar.
