= Mellado =

Mellado is a surname. Notable people with the surname include:

- Alba Mellado (born 1992), Spanish football (soccer) player
- Edith Mellado Céspedes (born 1938), Peruvian politician and educator
- Francisco de Paula Mellado, Spanish geographer who published the Enciclopedia moderna between 1851 and 1855
- Gaby Mellado (born 1992), Mexican television actress
- Galindo Mellado Cruz (1973–2014), known as "El Mellado", Mexican suspected drug lord, co-founder of Los Zetas
- Héctor Mellado (1925–2007), Chilean cyclist
- Iván Vázquez Mellado (born 1982), nickname "El Terrible", Mexican football (soccer) player
- Manuel Gutiérrez Mellado (1912–1995), Spanish Army officer, Honorary Captain General, 1st Minister of Defence in Spain
- Mario Mellado García (died 2014), Mexican lawyer, politician and judge
- Marisol Vazquez-Mellado Mollon, director of finance and administration for Médica Sur
- Miguel Mellado (born 1993), Argentine football (soccer) player
- Ramón Mellado Parsons (1904–1985), Puerto Rican educator, writer and politician
- Santiago Mellado (born 1963), President and CEO of Compassion International, a Christian child sponsorship organization

== See also ==
- Mella (disambiguation)
- Mello (disambiguation)
