= Ciénaga Grande =

Ciénaga Grande can refer to:

- Cerro Ciénaga Grande, mountain peak in Salta Province, Argentina
- Ciénaga Grande de Santa Marta, swamp in Colombia
- Cienaga Grande del Bajo Sinú, swamp in Colombia
