= Cerro Vicuñas =

Volcanic mountain in the Atacama Region, Chile

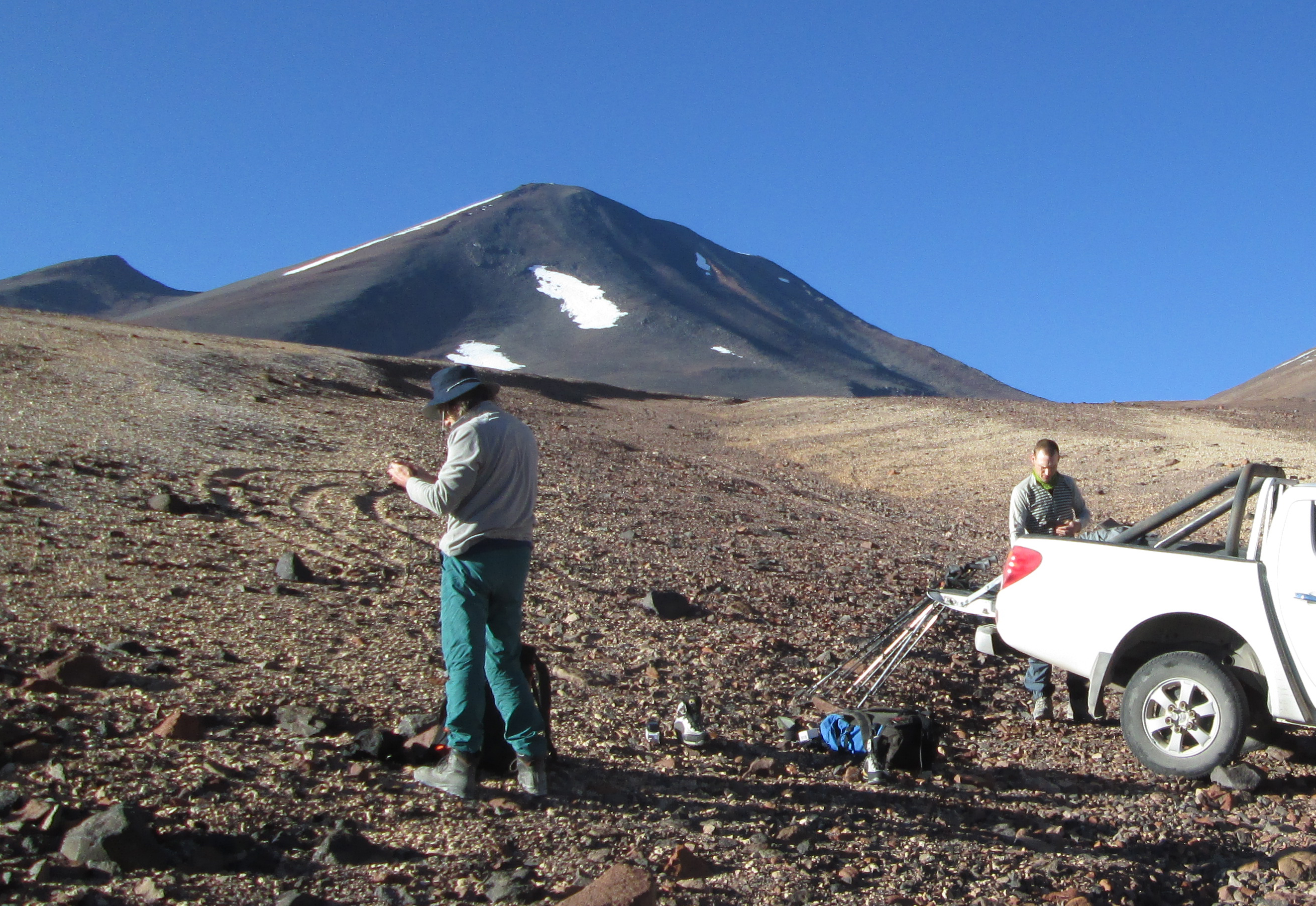
- Cerro Vicuñas seen from the Northeast

Highest point
- Elevation: 6,067 m (19,905 ft)
- Prominence: 726 m (2,382 ft)
- Parent peak: Barrancas Blancas
- Coordinates: 27°1′25.32″S 068°36′50.75″W

Geography
- Location within Chile
- Parent range: Andes

Climbing
- First ascent: 1969 or 01/23/1979 by Eduardo Saavedra Larraín (Chile) and Theo Dowbenka (Austria)

Cerro Vicuñas is a volcanic mountain in the Andes of Chile which lies immediately north of Ojos del Salado. It has a height of 6067 metres. Vicuñas if often used as acclimatisation peak before major peaks like Ojos del Salado. Its slopes are within the administrative boundaries of the Chilean commune of Copiapo.

== Elevation ==
Other data from available digital elevation models: SRTM yields 6063 metres, ASTER 6041 metres and TanDEM-X 6109 metres. The height of the nearest key col is 5354 meters, leading to a topographic prominence of 726 meters. Vicuñas is considered a Mountain Subgroup according to the Dominance System and its dominance is 11.94%. Its parent peak is Barrancas Blancas and the Topographic isolation is 6.3 kilometers.

== First Ascent ==
Vicuñas was first climbed by Eduardo Saavedra Larraín (Chile) and Theo Dowbenka (Austria) in 23rd of January 1979.

== See also ==
- List of mountains in the Andes
