= Cerro Barroso =

Mountain in Peru

Highest point
- Elevation: 5,741 m (18,835 ft)
- Coordinates: 17°33′23″S 69°35′44″W

Geography
- Location: Peru, Tacna Region
- Parent range: Andes

Cerro Barroso is a mountain in the Andes of Peru. It has a height of 5741 metres.

== See also ==
- List of mountains in the Andes
