= Cerro Cosapilla =

Mountain in Chile

Coordinates: 17°51′S 69°26′W

Cerro Cosapilla is a mountain in the Andes of Chile. It has a height of 5200 metres.

== See also ==
- List of mountains in the Andes
