= Cerro Quemado =

Mountain in Argentina

Coordinates: 27.51749°S 66.62932°W

Cerro Quemado (Burned Mountain) is a mountain in the Andes Mountains of Argentina. Found in the Atacama Plateau along with about 12 others (such as Cerro Solo, Antofalla, Pular), it has a height of 6,184 metres (20,289 ft).

== See also ==
- Sacabaya (volcano, aka 'Tambo Quemado')
- Almolonga (Guatemala, aka "Cerro Quemado" or "La Muela" (The Molar))
- Catamarca Province
- List of mountains in the Andes
