= Nevado Aguas Blancas =

Mountain in Argentina

Coordinates: 25°42′28″S 68°28′45″W

Nevado Aguas Blancas is a mountain in the Andes on the border between Argentina and Chile. It has a height of 5765 metres.

== See also ==
- List of mountains in the Andes
