= Cumbre del Laudo =

Mountain in Argentina

Coordinates: 26°30′S 68°32′W

Cumbre del Laudo is a mountain in the Andes Mountains of Argentina. It has a height of 6,152 metres (20,184 ft).

== See also ==
- List of mountains in the Andes
