= Cerro Doña Ana =

Mountain in Chile

Coordinates: 29°45′S 70°07′W

Cerro Doña Ana is a mountain in the Andes of Chile. At a height of 5648 meters, it is the third highest peak in Coquimbo Region of the country.

== See also ==
- List of mountains in the Andes
