= Cerro Amaculla =

Mountain in Chile

Coordinates: 21°01′S 68°52′W

- Location within Chile

Highest point
- Elevation: 4,380 m (14,370 ft)

Geography
- Location: Tamarugal, Chile
- Country: Chile
- Parent range: Chilean Andes

Cerro Amaculla is a mountain in the Andes mountains of Chile. It is located in the providence Tamarugal, in the Tarapacá Region of Northern Chile. Its peak has a height of 4,380 metres (14,370 ft).

== See also ==
- List of mountains in the Andes
