= Nevado Piquenes =

Mountain in Chile

- Location within Chile

Highest point
- Elevation: 6,019 m (19,747 ft)
- Coordinates: 33°30′51″S 69°50′07″W

Geography
- Location: Chile
- Parent range: Andes

Geology
- Rock age: Miocene
- Mountain type: Glacial horn

Nevado Piquenes is a mountain in the Andes Mountains of central Chile. It has a height of 6,019 metres (19,747 ft).

== See also ==
- List of mountains in the Andes
