= Nevado de Olivares =

Mountain in Argentina

Olivares

Highest point
- Elevation: 6,216 m (20,394 ft)
- Prominence: 1,317 m (4,321 ft)
- Coordinates: 30°17′55″S 69°54′03″W

Geography
- Location: Coquimbo Region, Chile
- Parent range: Andes

Climbing
- First ascent: 1964
- Easiest route: From Argentina by the north slopes

Nevado Olivares also known as Cerro de Olivares, is a mountain in the Andes Mountains, on the Chile–Argentina border. It lies just south of the Agua Negra Pass, one of the highest road passes in the Andes. It has a height of 6,216 metres (20,394 ft).

== See also ==
- List of mountains in the Andes
