= El Ermitaño =

Mountain in Chile

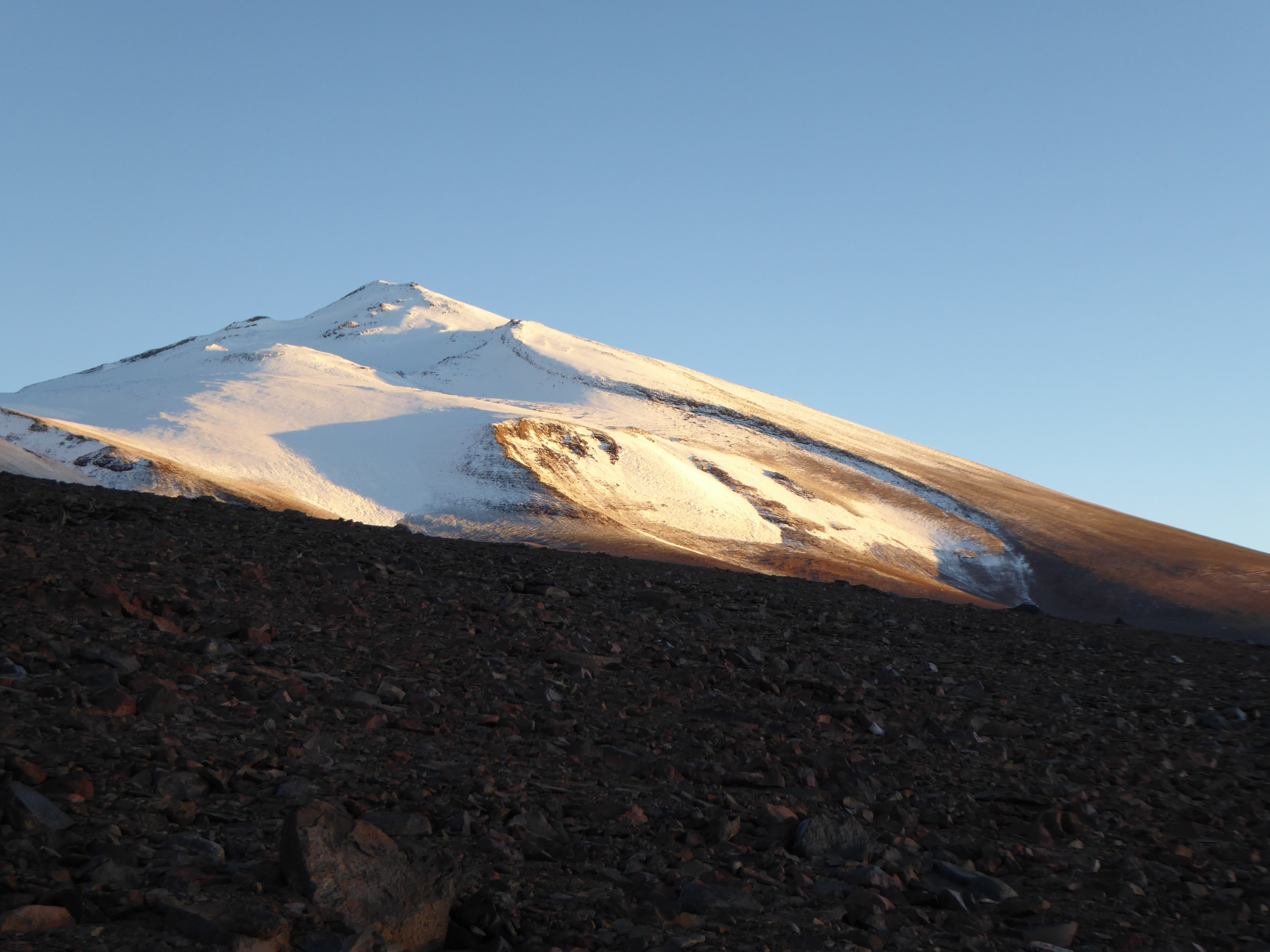

Highest point
- Elevation: 6,146 m (20,164 ft)
- Prominence: 1,344 m (4,409 ft)
- Parent peak: Cerro El Condor
- Coordinates: 26°47′02.03″S 068°36′02.52″W

Geography
- Location within Chile
- Parent range: Chilean Andes, Andes

Climbing
- First ascent: 11/21/1967 - Sergio Kunsmann, Pedro Rosende, Etienne Vian (Chile) Heinz Koch (Germany)

El Ermitaño is a peak in Chile with an elevation of 6,146 metres (20,164 ft) metres located at Puna de Atacama. It is on the border of the Chilean provinces of Chañaral and Copiapó (Communes of Diego de Almagro and Copiapó) Along with Cerro Peña Blanca, lies on the southern rim of the Wheelwright Caldera.

== First Ascent ==
El Ermitaño was first climbed by Sergio Kunsmann, Pedro Rosende and Etienne Vian (Chile) Heinz Koch (Germany) in 11/21/1967.

== Elevation ==
It has an official height of 6146 meters. Other data from available digital elevation models: SRTM yields 6134 metres, ASTER 6113 metres and TanDEM-X 6175 metres. The height of the nearest key col is 4802 meters, leading to a topographic prominence of 1344 meters. El Ermitaño is considered a Mountain Subrange according to the Dominance System and its dominance is 21.87%. Its parent peak is Cerro El Condor and the Topographic isolation is 29.2 kilometers.

== See also ==
- List of mountains in the Andes
- San Francisco Pass
