= Nevados de Poquis =

Mountain in Chile

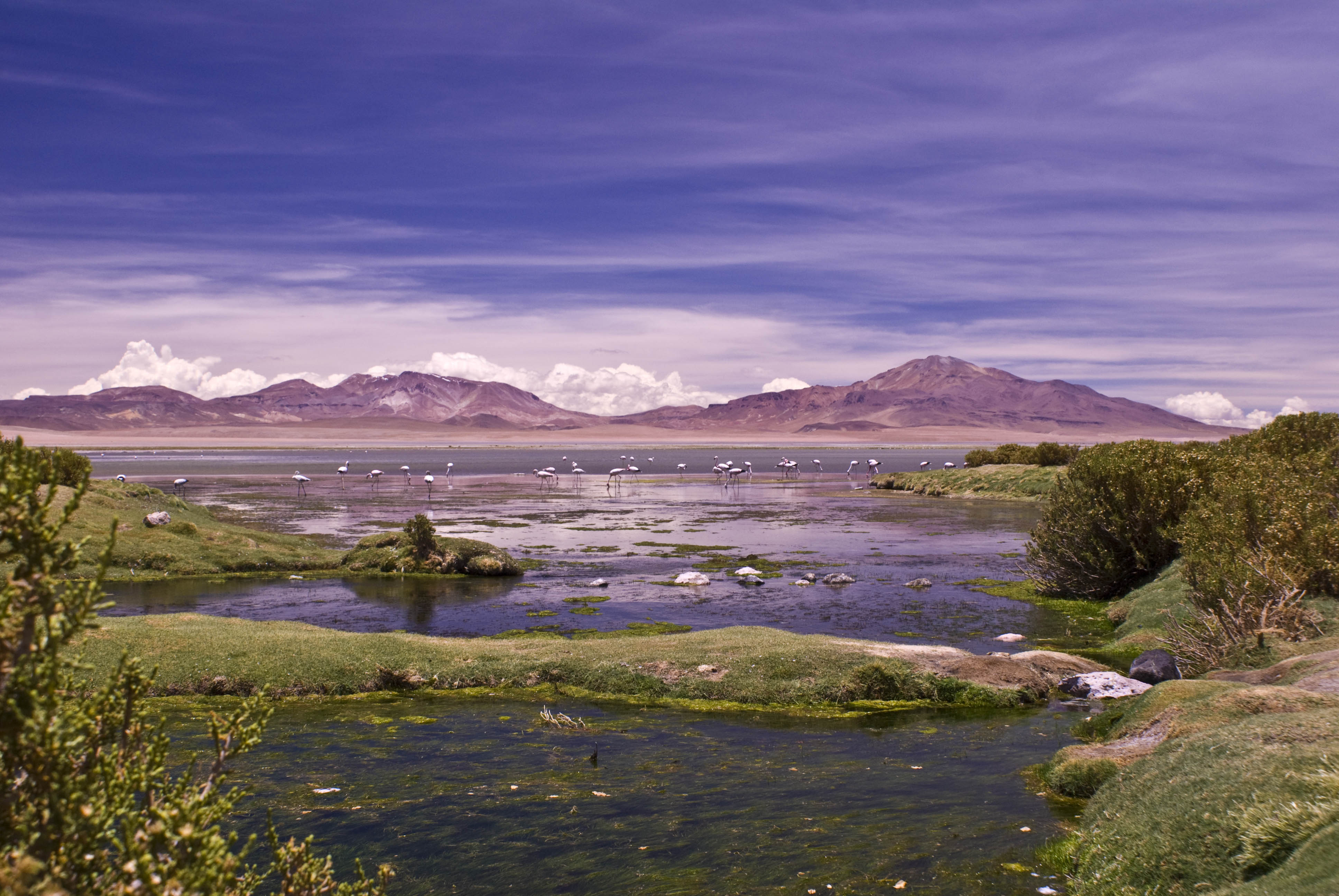
- Salar de Tara with Nevados de Poquis (right) in the distance.

Highest point
- Elevation: 5,756 m (18,885 ft)
- Coordinates: 23°02′S 67°03′W

Geography
- Location within Chile
- Location: Antofagasta Region, Chile
- Parent range: Andes

Nevados de Poquis is a mountain in the Andes of Chile, close to the border with Argentina. It has a height of 5,756 meters (18,885 ft), and is located north of Paso de Jama and southeast of Zapaleri.

== See also ==
- List of mountains in the Andes
