= Salín =

Mountain in Argentina

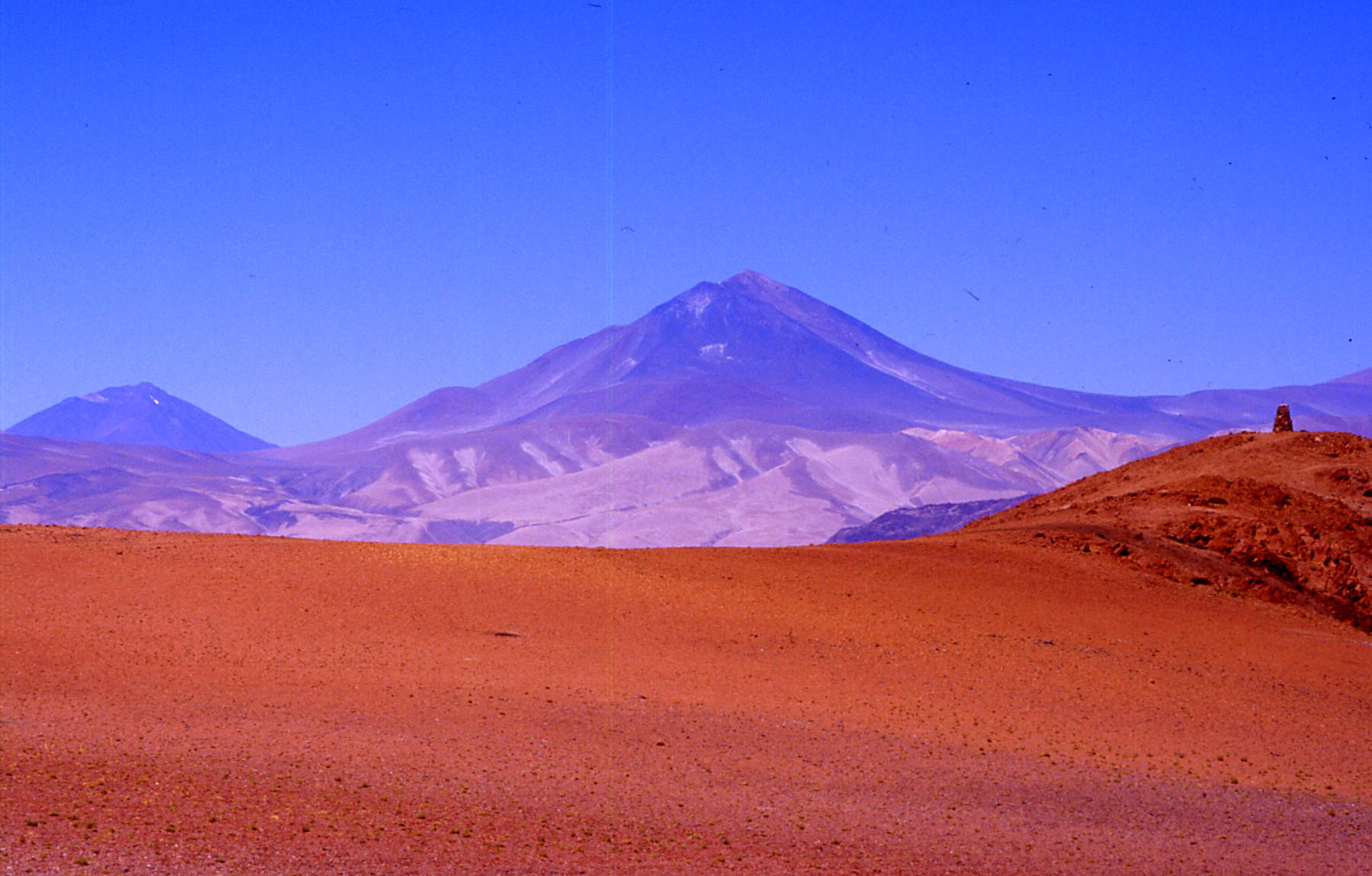
- Aracar and Salin (on the right) seen from near Monturaqui station in Chile

Highest point
- Elevation: 6,029 m (19,780 ft)
- Prominence: 1,494 m (4,902 ft)
- Parent peak: Pular
- Listing: Ultra
- Coordinates: 24°19′42.59″S 068°4′04.43″W

Geography
- Location within Chile
- Location: Salta, Argentina and El Loa and Antofagasta Province, Chile

Climbing
- First ascent: 05/10/1960 - Sergio Bossini and Carlos Mas (Argentina) (and pre-Columbian)

Salín is a mountain at the border of Argentina and Chile with an elevation of 6,029 metres (19,780 ft) metres. Salin is within the following mountain ranges: Argentine Andes, Chilean Andes, Puna de Atacama. Its territory is within the Argentinean protection area of Provincial Fauna Reserve Los Andes. It is on the border of 3 provinces: Argentinean province of Salta; Chilean provinces of El Loa and Antofagasta. Its slopes are within 3 cities: Argentinean city of Tolar Grande, Chilean cities of San Pedro de Atacama and Antofagasta (Chile).

== Elevation ==
Other data from available digital elevation models: SRTM yields 6024 metres, ASTER 6008 metres and TanDEM-X 6066 metres. The height of the nearest key col is 4546 meters, leading to a topographic prominence of 1494 meters. Salin is considered a Mountain Range according to the Dominance System and its dominance is 24.74%. Its parent peak is Pular and the Topographic isolation is 14.2 kilometers.

== First Ascent ==
Salin was first climbed by Sergio Bossini and Carlos Mas (Argentina) in October 5 th 1960.

== See also ==
- List of mountains in the Andes
