= Cerro Bravo Alto =

Mountain in Atacama Region, Chile

Cerro Bravo Alto is a mountain in the Andes Mountains of Chile. It has a height of 5,313 metres (17,431 ft).

== See also ==
- List of mountains in the Andes
