= Cerro Doña Inés =

Mountain in Chile

Coordinates: 26°05′S 69°12′W

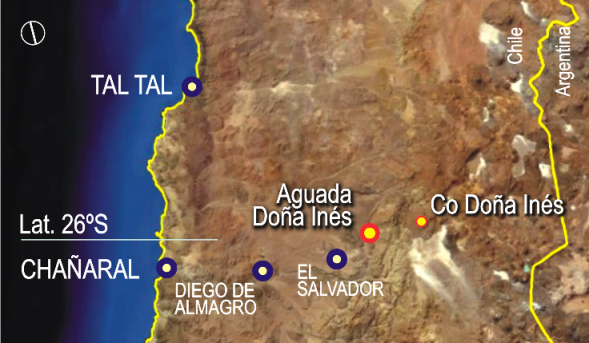
Cerro Doña Inés

Cerro Doña Inés is an inactive volcano in the Chilean Andes, in the Atacama Region. It has a height of 5075 metres.

== See also ==
- List of mountains in the Andes
