= Cerro Pajonal =

Mountain in Argentina

Coordinates: 25°27′S 68°18′W

Cerro Pajonal is a mountain in the Andes Mountains of Argentina. It has a height of 5,500 metres (18,045 ft).

== See also ==
- List of mountains in the Andes
