= Del Veladero =

Mountain in Argentina

Coordinates: 28°4′23″S 68°58′40″W

Del Veladero is an Andean mountain in the La Rioja province of Argentina. Its summit is 6,436 metres (21,115 ft) above sea level. A subpeak to the northeast is 6,070 metres (19,910 ft) above sea level.

== See also ==
- List of mountains in the Andes
