= Cerro Pasto Salado =

Mountain in Chile

Coordinates: 30°00′39″S 070°11′29″W

Cerro Pasto Salado is a mountain in the Chilean area of the Andes. It has a height of 4,843 metres.

== See also ==
- List of mountains in the Andes
