= Cerro Chilinchilín =

Mountain in Chile

Coordinates: 20°11′S 68°59′W

Cerro Chilinchilín is a mountain in the Andes of Chile. It has a height of 4506 metres.

== See also ==
- List of mountains in the Andes
