= Calinga =

Mountain in Argentina

Calinga is a mountain in the Andes of Argentina. It has a height of 6028 metres.

== See also ==
- List of mountains in the Andes
