= Cerro de La Isla =

Mountain in Chile

Coordinates: 25.604373°S 70.425020°W

Cerro de La Isla is a mountain in the Andes of Chile. It has a height of 5,763 metres (18,907 ft).

== See also ==
- List of mountains in the Andes
