= Cerro Tapado =

Mountain in the Coquimbo Region, Chile

Coordinates: 32.2903°S 71.4203°W

Cerro Tapado is a mountain in the Andes of Chile. It has a height of 5536 metres.

== See also ==
- List of mountains in the Andes
