= Sierra de Bequeville =

Mountain range in Argentina

Sierra de Bequeville is a mountain range in Argentina. It is formed by two ridges, one mostly formed by Ordovician flysch and the other by rocks of uncertain age. The Eocene Geste Formation, a 500 metres (1,600 ft) thick welded tuff and correlative rocks dated to 16.7 ± 0.1 million years ago, and continental clast strata from 13.21 ± 0.6 million years ago form the rest of the range.

Cinder cones along the Bequeville fault which runs in the range have erupted lava flows of basaltic andesite composition which are similar to other Puna volcanic rocks. This fault originally was probably a thrust fault; later strike-slip faulting induced the onset of crustal extension which localizes the volcanic vents.
