= Cerro Ciénaga Grande =

Mountain in Argentina

Coordinates: 24°43′S 66°24′W

Cerro Ciénaga Grande is a mountain in the Andes of Argentina. It has a height of 6,030 metres (19,780 ft).

== See also ==
- List of mountains in the Andes
