= Barrancas Blancas =

Mountain in Chile

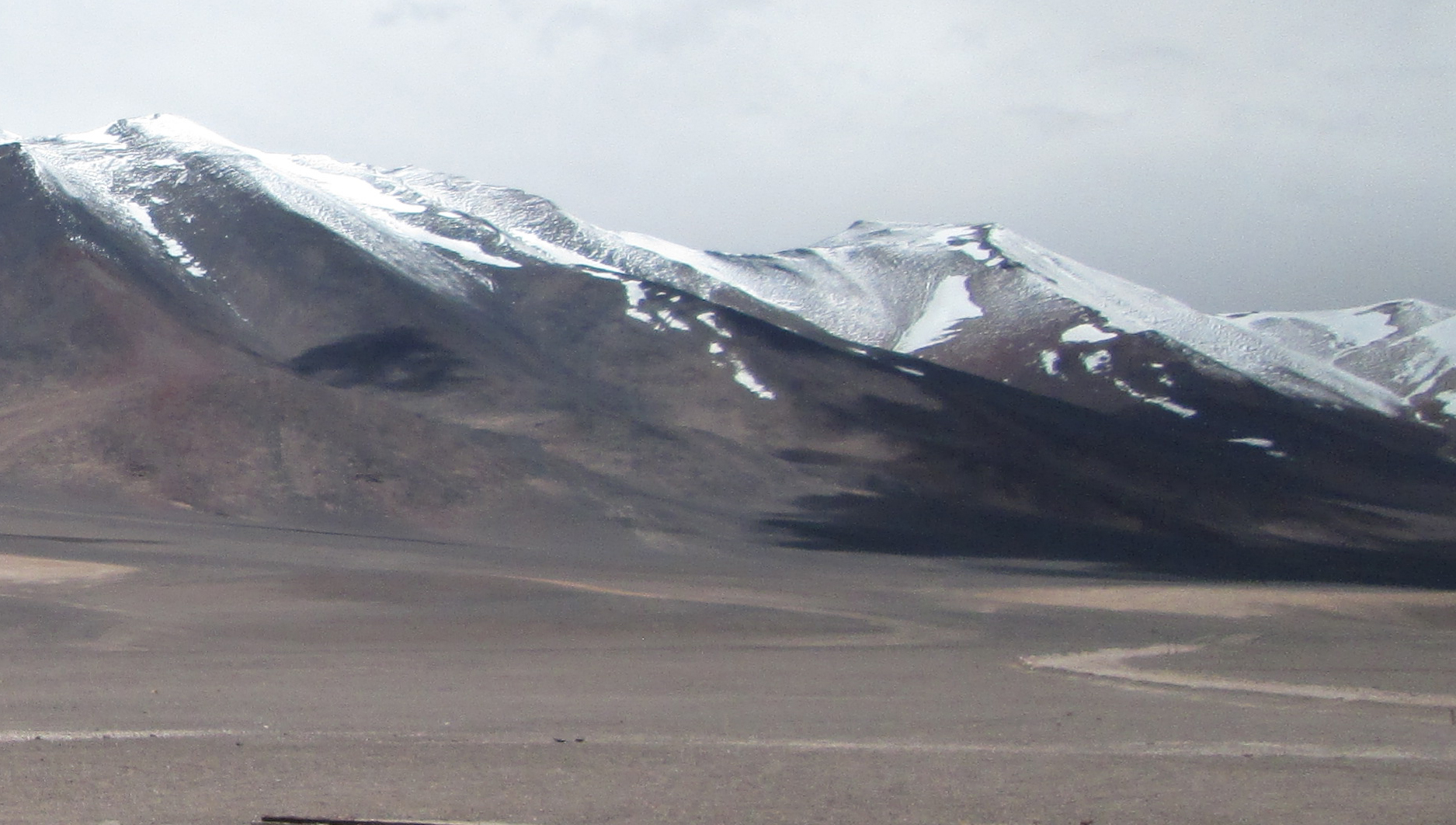
- Barrancas Blancas seen from the northeast

Highest point
- Elevation: 6,119 m (20,075 ft)
- Prominence: 1,059 m (3,474 ft)
- Parent peak: Ojos del Salado
- Listing: Mountains of Chile; Mountains of the Andes
- Coordinates: 26°59′27″S 68°39′59″W

Geography
- Location within Chile
- Country: Chile
- Region: Atacama
- Province: Copiapó
- City: Copiapó
- Parent range: Chilean Andes; Andes

Climbing
- First ascent: 15 Feb 1969 by Gaston Muga, Julián Bilbao, Arnaldo González (Chile)
- Easiest route: North Ridge

Barrancas Blancas is a peak in Chile with an elevation of 6,119 metres (20,075 ft) metres. Barrancas Blancas is within the following mountain ranges: Chilean Andes and Puna de Atacama. It is located within the territory of the Chilean province of Copiapo. Its slopes are within the administrative boundaries of the Chilean commune of Copiapo.

== First Ascent ==
Barrancas Blancas was first climbed by Gaston Muga, Julián Bilbao and Arnaldo González (Chile) 15 February 1969.

== Elevation ==
Other data from available digital elevation models: SRTM yields 6095 metres, ASTER 6077 metres and TanDEM-X 6146 metres. The height of the nearest key col is 5,060 m (16,600 ft), leading to a topographic prominence of 1,059 m (3,474 ft). Barrancas Blancas is considered a Mountain Massif according to the Dominance System and its dominance is 17.31%. Its parent peak is Ojos del Salado and the Topographic isolation is 18.1 km (11.2 mi).
