= Mella =

Mella can refer to:

== Geography ==
- Mella (river), an Italian river of Lombardy
- Mella, Cuba, a municipality of Santiago de Cuba Province, Cuba
- Mella, Independencia, a municipality of the Independencia Province, Dominican Republic
- Villa Mella, a municipal district of Santo Domingo Norte, Dominican Republic
- Mella, Nebraska, a community in the United States

Municipalities of Italy

- Azzano Mella, in the Province of Brescia, Lombardy
- Bagnolo Mella, in the Province of Brescia, Lombardy
- Castel Mella, in the Province of Brescia, Lombardy
- Pavone del Mella, in the Province of Brescia, Lombardy
- Tavernole sul Mella, in the Province of Brescia, Lombardy

== People ==
- Edoardo Arborio Mella (1808–1884), an Italian architect
- Julio Antonio Mella (1903-1929), one of the founders of the "internationalized" Cuban Communist Party
- Juan López Mella (1965-1995), Spanish motorcycle racer
- Keury Mella, baseball player
- Matías Ramón Mella (1816-1864), national hero of the Dominican Republic
- Ricardo Mella (1861-1925), Spanish writer and anarchist
- Urania Mella (1900-1945), Spanish politician, daughter of Ricardo Mella

== Other ==
- Mella (Golgafrinchan), a character from The Hitchhiker's Guide to the Galaxy by Douglas Adams
