= Peña Blanca (mountain) =

Mountain in Chile

- Location within Chile

Highest point
- Elevation: 6,050 m (19,850 ft)
- Prominence: 479 metres (1,572 ft)
- Parent peak: El Ermitaño
- Coordinates: 26°48′43.92″S 068°38′29.39″W

Geography
- Parent range: Chilean Andes, Andes

Climbing
- First ascent: 21/11/1967 - Sergio Kunsmann, Pedro Rosende and Etienne Vian (Chile)

Peña Blanca is a mountain in Chile with an elevation of 6,050 metres (19,849 ft) metres. Peña Blanca is within the following mountain ranges: Chilean Andes, Puna de Atacama. It is on the border of two provinces: the Chilean provinces of Chañaral and Copiapó. Its slopes are within the territory of two Chilean cities: Diego de Almagro and Copiapó.

== First ascent ==
Peña Blanca was first climbed by Sergio Kunsmann, Pedro Rosende and Etienne Vian (Chile) in November 21st 1967. American Alpine Journal 1957, page 74-91 mentions an ascent by Gajardo to Peñas Blancas (Feb 7th 1957). But this was probably to the secondary summit as Kunsmann, Rosende and Vian did not find any evidence of such ascent.

== Elevation ==
It has an official height of 6030 meters. Other data from available digital elevation models: SRTM yields 6034 metres, ASTER 6022 metres, ALOS 6034 metres and TanDEM-X 6074 metres. The height of the nearest key col is 5571 meters, leading to a topographic prominence of 479 meters. Peña Blanca is considered a Mountain according to the Dominance System and its dominance is 7.92%. Its parent peak is El Ermitaño and the Topographic isolation is 5.1 kilometers.
