= Nevado de Cachi =

Mountain in Argentina

Cachi
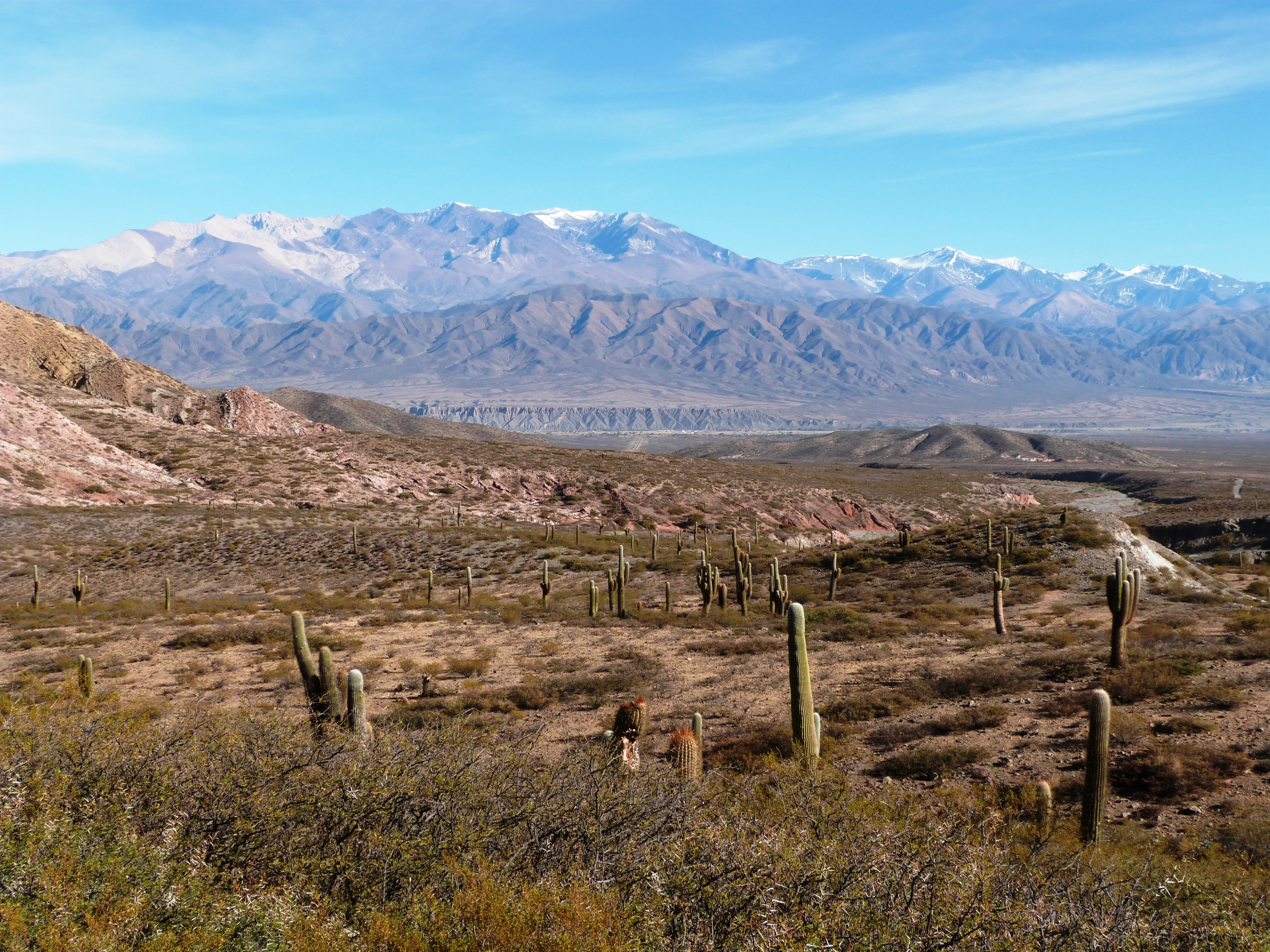
- View of Nevado de Cachi (the snowcapped mountain in the center of the image).

Highest point
- Elevation: 6,380 m (20,930 ft)
- Coordinates: 24°55′59.9″S 66°22′59.9″W

Geography
- Location within Argentina
- Location: Salta Province, Argentina
- Parent range: Andes

Nevado de Cachi is the name given to a large complex of mountains that lies in Salta Province, Argentina. This complex counts several summits, the highest being 6,380m and it is called Cumbre Libertador. This summit was climbed for the first time in 1950. The mountains overlook Cachi, a traditional village of Northern Argentina. The main summit is rarely climbed (less than 5 expeditions per year) and the secondary summits even less. Some of them have been climbed only once. The mountain can be climbed, in favourable weather conditions, in five days by a party fully acclimatised to an altitude of 4,000m.
The quality of the rock is almost everywhere poor, there is permanent snow but almost no glacier. Climbing interest is little but the area is of outstanding beauty. Almost all routes are easy but rockfalls are common. In summer the snow-line is about at 5,800m; in winter it is significantly lower (as low as 3,500m) making possible some technical climbs (ice and snow route at about 55 degrees). The region experiences the same seasons of Bolivia, summers are dry but winter can be very rainy with heavy snowfalls. Wind is probably the main hazard and should be not underestimated.

== See also ==
- Sierra de Bequeville
- List of mountains in the Andes
