= Pico Espejo =

Mountain in Venezuela

Coordinates: 8°31′45″N 71°3′49″W

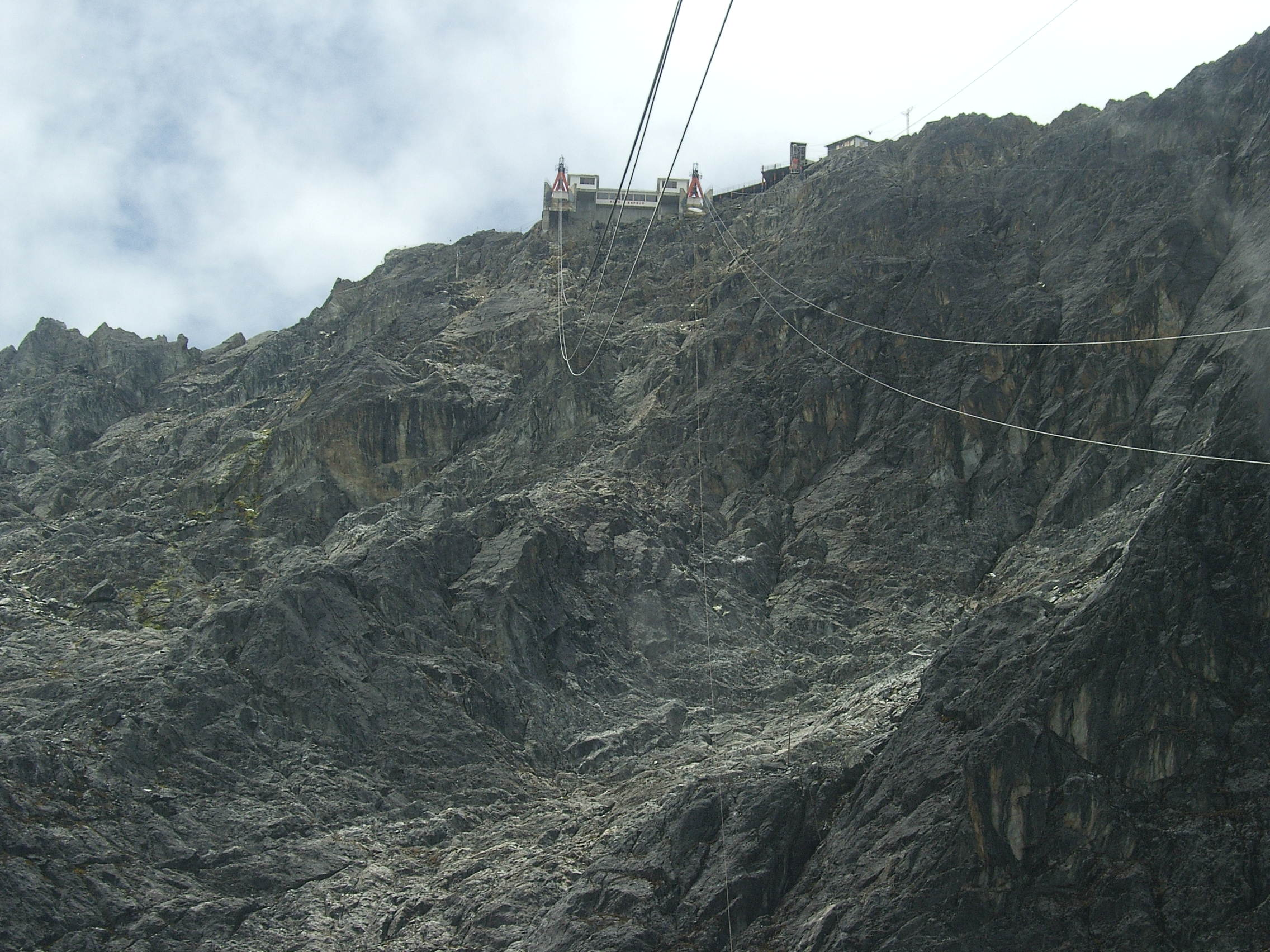
Pico Espejo and cable car

Pico Espejo (Mirror Peak) is a mountain in the Andes of Venezuela. It has a height of 4,880 metres (16,010 ft). Near its peak is the fifth and final station of the Mérida cable car, which was out of service for renovations from December 2008 until April 2016.

== See also ==
- List of mountains in the Andes
