= Marisol Vazquez-Mellado Mollon =

Marisol Vazquez-Mellado Mollon is the director of finance and administration for Médica Sur. During her career, she has been listed as one of Mexico's 100 most powerful women by CNN Expansíon.

Vazquez has a bachelor's degree in public accounting from the Instituto Tecnológico Autónomo de México and a master's degree in business economics (1996) from the Monterrey Institute of Technology and Higher Studies.

Marisol Vazquez-Mellado Mollon is the current director of finance and administration Médica Sur, a hospital group located in Mexico. She was named to this position in 2016. This position follows stints as the director of finance of Grupo KUO (2006–2016) and as chief financial officer for Desc SA de CV (1990–2007).

While at KUO in 2008, the company faced a severe financial crisis with a debt of US$471 million, about a quarter of its net sales. Vazquez restructured and reduced the debt by three percent which helped the company gain a stable rating in international rankings.

Vazquez was named to CNN Expansión's list of 100 most powerful women in Mexico in various years.
