= Los Nevados, Venezuela =

Coordinates: 8.4614°N 71.0750°W

Los Nevados
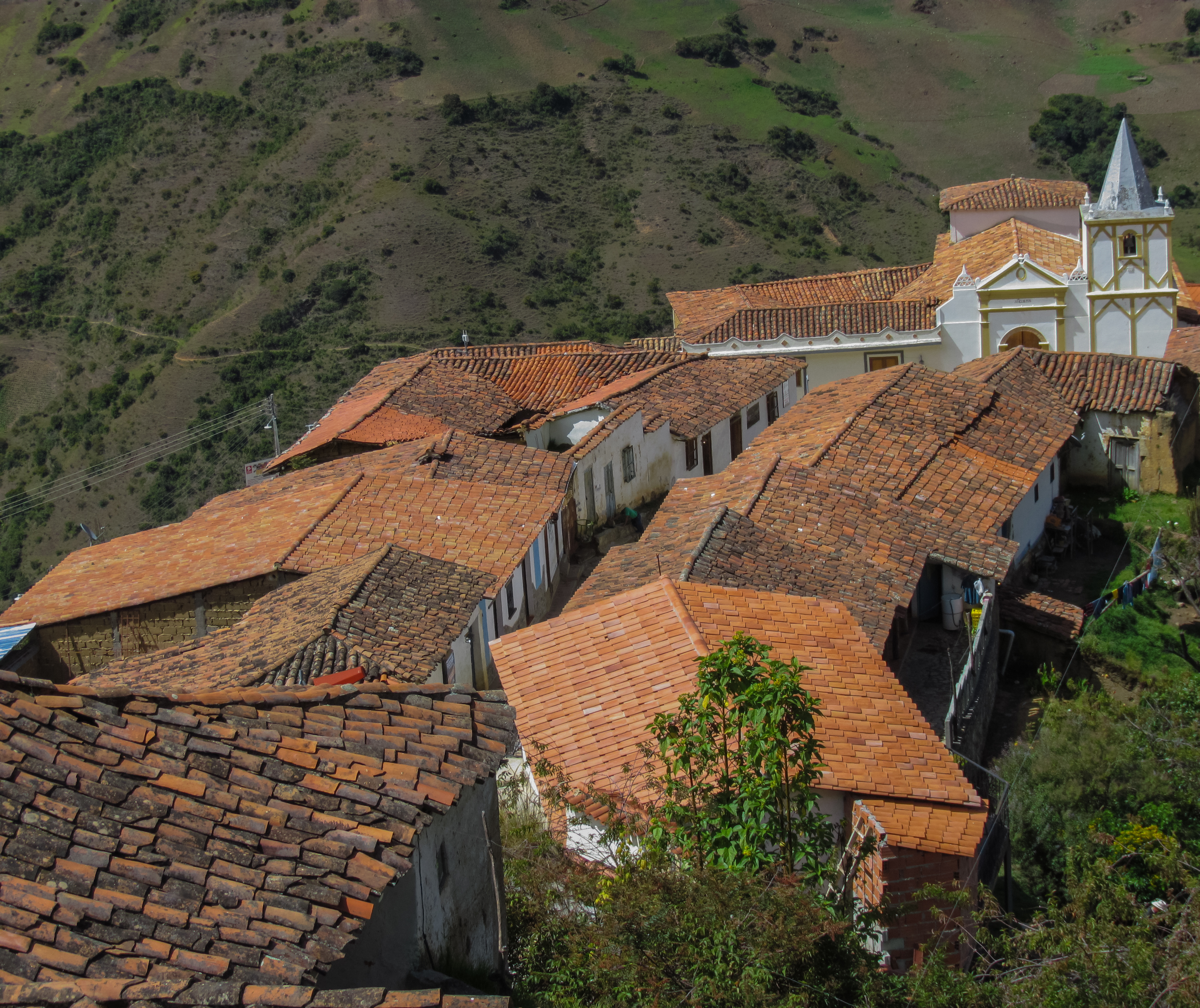
- Street in Los Nevados

- Location within Venezuela
- Country: Venezuela
- States: Mérida
- Municipalities: Libertador Municipality
- Established: 1591
- Elevation: 2,711 m (8,894 ft)

Population (2011)
  - Total: 656
- Time zone: UTC-4:30
- Area code: +58 274
- Climate: Cfb

Los Nevados, is a town founded in 1591, located in the Sierra Nevada National Park in Mérida, Venezuela, located 2,710 meters above sea level and with a population of 2000 inhabitants. its name comes from the glaciers of the peaks León, Toro and Espejo that could be seen from Los Nevados before their disappearance in the 1960s . the main activity of the area is tourism, with its horse and donkey rides via the cable car station Loma Redonda. Its inhabitants are also engaged in farming, especially the cultivation of potatoes, corn, wheat and garlic.
