= Mérida cable car =

National historical monument of Venezuela

Coordinates: 8°31′45″N 71°03′49″W

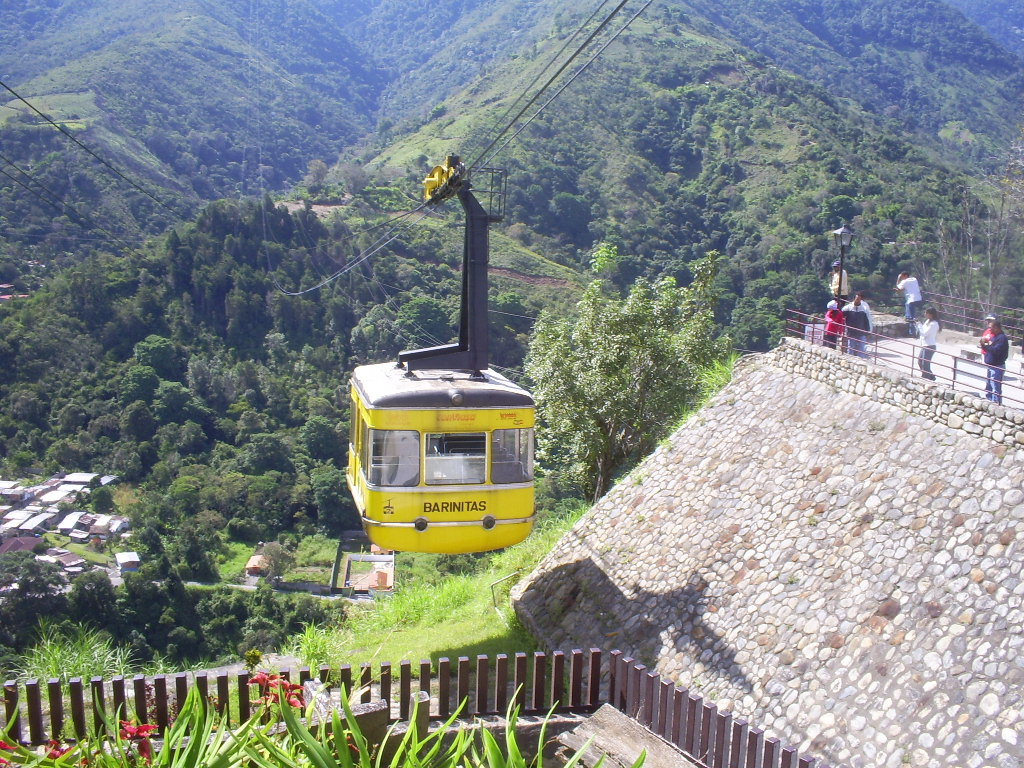
Mérida cable car cabin arriving at the first station.

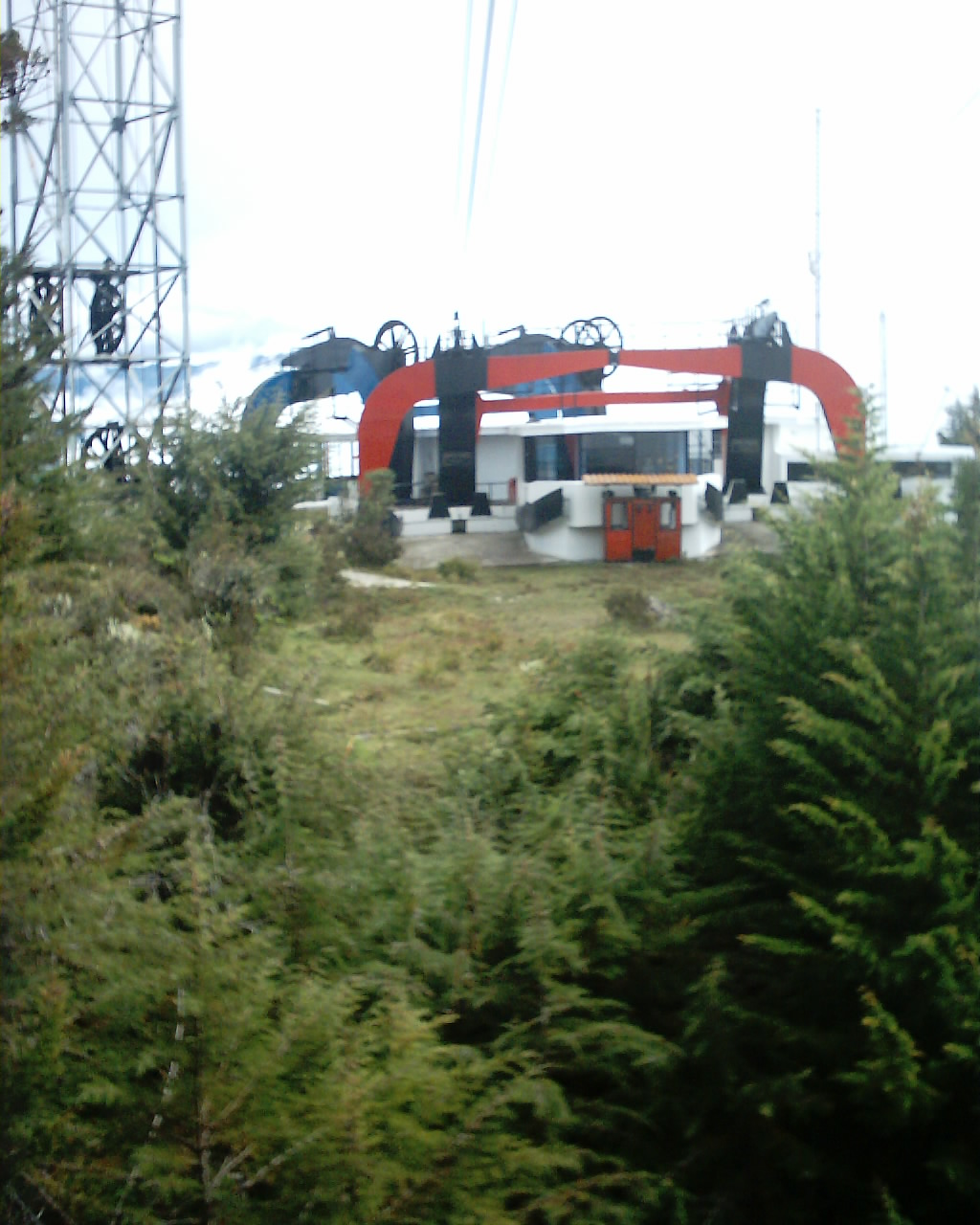
La Aguada Station

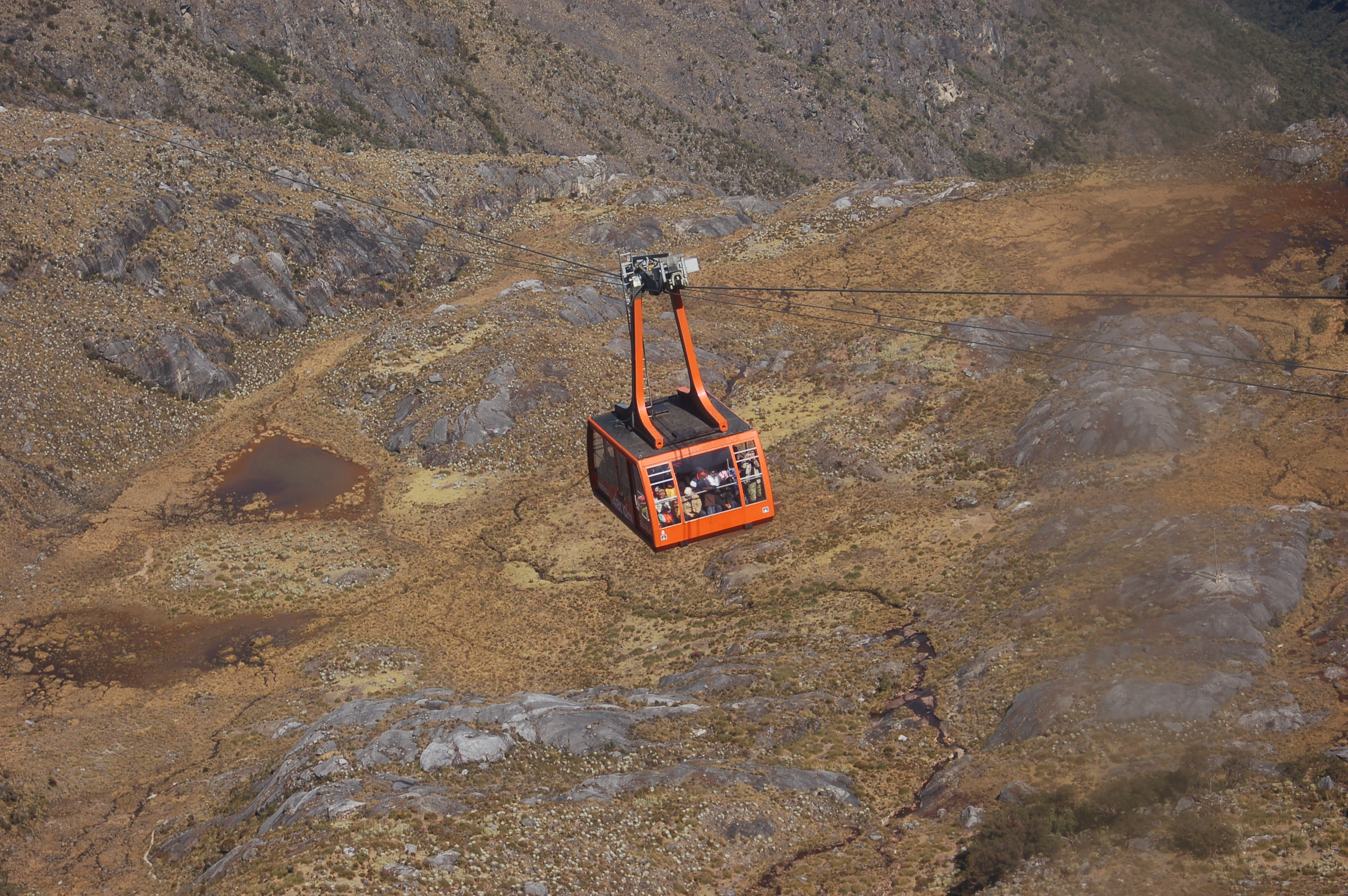
Mérida Cable Car

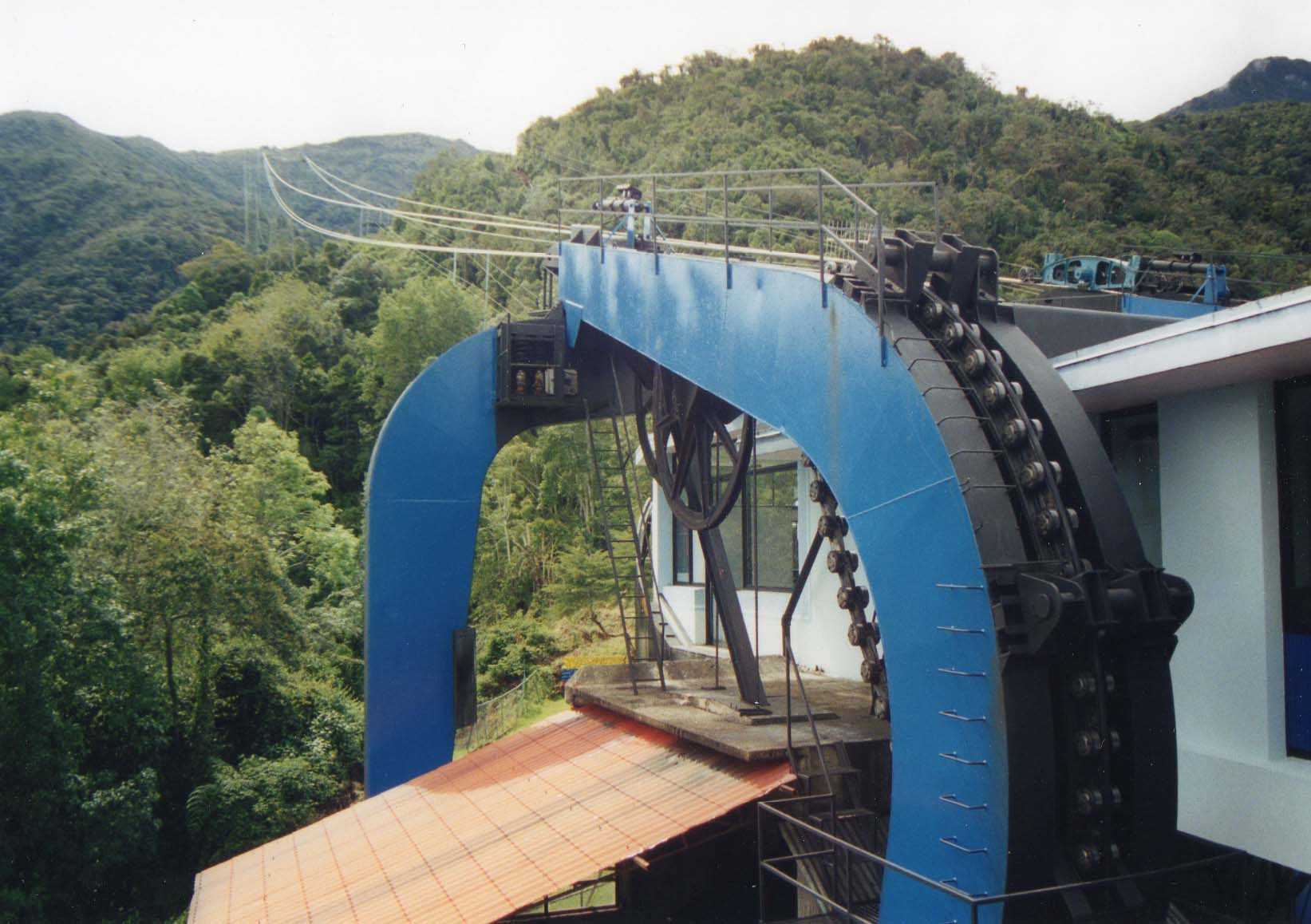
Mérida Cable Car, lowest station, Barinitas.

The Mérida Cable Car (Spanish: Teleférico de Mérida) is a cable car system in Venezuela. Its base is located in the Venezuelan city of Mérida at an altitude of 1,577 metres (5,174 ft), and its terminus is on Pico Espejo, at 4,765 metres (15,633 ft). It is the highest and second longest cable car in the world. The system was opened to the public in 1960, and closed in 2008 for reconstruction. In October 2016, a new regular service was inaugurated.

== Structure ==
The Mérida Cable Car comprises four cable cars connected serially, covering 12.5 kilometres (7.8 mi) over rugged terrain between the city of Mérida and the Espejo Peak.

Each section of the route has two lanes, and in each lane, there is a cable car that can transport 36 passengers. The cable car moves at a velocity of 5 metres per second (18 km/h; 11 mph) thanks to the suspended cable that was run by an engine. There are two different engines: the first is in the La Montaña station which serves to the section between that station and the La Aguada station. The other one is located in the Loma Redonda station and serves the rest of the section

== History and administration ==
The system emerged from the former Venezuelan Andean Club (Club Andino Venezolano) project in 1952. Its purpose was to make it easier to ascend to the Sierra Nevada de Mérida. The idea was approved by the government. In 1955, the design was approved and construction started. In December 1956, the route towards the mountains was marked.

On November 8, 1957, the first car of the Loading System arrived at La Aguada, overcoming the natural barriers of the Andean forests. The system opened to the public in March 1960.

The cable car itself was built in France by 25 different companies, hired by the enterprise Applevage, a specialist in cable cars. Other foreign companies assumed specialized tasks: Eggeca was in charge of the civil works, Egecom was in charge of the metal structures, and Sucre-Barret was responsible for essential duties. The first three sections of the loading cable car were built by the German company Heckel and the last by the Swiss company Habegger.

The director of the works was Maurice Comte from France. Most of the work was performed by workers from Mérida state. Technicians and engineers came from many foreign countries, including Poland, Yugoslavia, Colombia and Haiti. The international contribution was evident until its closure in 2008, as operators would often speak in French rather than Spanish.

== Closure and reconstruction ==
On August 11, 2008, the Venezuelan Ministry of Tourism announced that there would be an indefinite closure of the cable car service to the general public. A report made by The Doppelmayr Group recommended no further repairs to the existing aerial tramway system since it had reached the end of its service life. The construction of a brand new cable car system was announced, with a projected opening date in 2012, which was subsequently delayed. In October 2016, the new cable car was opened to the public.
