= List of mountains in Argentina =

This is a list of mountains situated in Argentina, South America. The list also shows the height of each mountain.

== Mountains ==
- Aconcagua (Mendoza) 6,962 m (22,841 ft)
  - Nevado El Plomo 6,070 m (19,910 ft)
  - Cerro Ameghino approx. 5,940 m (19,490 ft)
- Ojos del Salado (Catamarca) 6,893 m (22,615 ft)
  - Tres Cruces Sur 6,748 m (22,139 ft)
  - Cazadero 6,658 m (21,844 ft)
  - El Muerto 6,488 m (21,286 ft)
  - Cerro Nacimiento 6,436 m (21,115 ft)
  - Cerro Veladero 6,436 m (21,115 ft)
  - Cerro El Cóndor (also Volcán Sarmiento) 6,414 m (21,043 ft)
  - Cerro Vallecitos 6,168 m (20,236 ft)
  - Tres Quebradas (also Los Patos) 6,239 m (20,469 ft)
  - Cerro Medusa 6,120 m (20,080 ft)
  - Colorados 6,080 m (19,950 ft)
  - Cerro El Fraile 6,061 m (19,885 ft)
  - Volcán del Viento 6,028 m (19,777 ft)
  - Cerro San Francisco 6,018 m (19,744 ft)
- Monte Pissis (La Rioja) 6,795 m (22,293 ft)
- Cerro Bonete (La Rioja) 6,759 m (22,175 ft)
- Llullaillaco (Salta) 6,723 m (22,057 ft)
  - Socompa 6,051 m (19,852 ft)
- Mercedario (San Juan) 6,720 m (22,050 ft)
  - Cerro Ramada 6,384 m (20,945 ft)
  - Cerro La Mesa 6,230 m (20,440 ft)
- Incahuasi (Catamarca) 6,621 m (21,722 ft)
- Tupungato (Mendoza) 6,570 m (21,560 ft)
  - Cerro Alto San Juan 6,148 m (20,171 ft)
  - Cerro Negro Pabellón 6,070 m (19,910 ft)
  - Cerro Polleras 5,993 m (19,662 ft)
- Antofalla (Salta) 6,440 m (21,130 ft)
- Cachi (Nevado de Cachi) 6,380 m (20,930 ft)
  - Cerro Quemado 6,184 m (20,289 ft)
- Reclus 6,335 m (20,784 ft)
- Majadita 6,280 m (20,600 ft)
  - Cerro Olivares 6,216 m (20,394 ft)
- Cerro Solo 6,205 m (20,358 ft)
- Cerro El Toro (San Juan) 6,168 m (20,236 ft)
- Cerro Tortolas 6,160 m (20,210 ft)
- Queva 6,140 m (20,140 ft)
- Colangüil 6,122 m (20,085 ft)
- Marmolejo 6,108 m (20,039 ft)
- Medusa 6,130 m (20,110 ft)
- Nevado de Famatina (also Cerro Belgrano) 6,097 m (20,003 ft)
- Aracar 6,095 m (19,997 ft)
- Cerro Baboso (also Veladero N.E.) approx. 6,070 m (19,910 ft)
- Cerro Salin (Salín) 6,029 m (19,780 ft)
- Cerro Laguna Blanca 6,012 m (19,724 ft)
- Cerro El Plata (Mendoza) 5,968 m (19,580 ft)
- Cerro Chañi (Jujuy) approx. 5,930 m (19,460 ft)
- Galán (Catamarca) 5,920 m (19,420 ft)
- Cerro Tolosa 5,432 m (17,822 ft)

== See also ==
- List of volcanoes in Argentina
