= List of mountains in Chile =

== Mountains by elevation ==
| Mountain | Metres | Feet | Location and Notes |
|---|---|---|---|
| Ojos del Salado | 6,891 | 22,608 | Atacama Region – Highest volcano on Earth |
| Nevado Tres Cruces | 6,749 | 22,142 | Atacama |
| Llullaillaco | 6,739 | 22,110 | Antofagasta |
| Nevado Tres Cruces Central | 6,629 | 21,749 | Atacama |
| Incahuasi | 6,621 | 21,722 | Atacama |
| Tupungato | 6,570 | 21,560 | Santiago Metropolitan |
| El Muerto | 6,488 | 21,286 | Atacama |
| Parinacota | 6,348 | 20,827 | Tarapacá |
| Pomerape | 6,282 | 20,610 | Tarapacá |
| Tres Quebradas | 6,239 | 20,469 | Atacama |
| Pular | 6,233 | 20,449 | Antofagasta |
| Olivares | 6,216 | 20,394 | Coquimbo |
| Solo | 6,190 | 20,310 | Atacama |
| Aucanquilcha | 6,176 | 20,262 | Antofagasta |
| El Toro | 6,168 | 20,236 | Atacama |
| Las Tórtolas | 6,155 | 20,194 | Coquimbo |
| Alto | 6,148 | 20,171 | Santiago Metropolitan |
| El Ermitaño | 6,146 | 20,164 | Atacama |
| San Pedro | 6,145 | 20,161 | Antofagasta |
| Medusa | 6,130 | 20,110 |
| Sierra Nevada de Lagunas Bravas | 6,127 | 20,102 | Atacama |
| Barrancas Blancas | 6,119 | 20,075 | Atacama |
| Marmolejo | 6,108 | 20,039 | Santiago Metropolitan |
| San Pablo | 6,092 | 19,987 | Antofagasta |
| Colorados | 6,080 | 19,950 | Atacama |
| Guallatiri | 6,071 | 19,918 | Tarapacá |
| Nevado del Plomo | 6,070 | 19,910 | Santiago Metropolitan |
| Vicuñas | 6,067 | 19,905 | Atacama |
| El Fraile | 6,061 | 19,885 | Atacama |
| Acotango | 6,052 | 19,856 | Tarapacá |
| Copiapó | 6,052 | 19,856 | Atacama |
| Socompa | 6,051 | 19,852 | Antofagasta |
| Acamarachi | 6,046 | 19,836 | Antofagasta |
| Peña Blanca | 6,030 | 19,780 | Atacama |
| Palpana | 6,023 | 19,760 | Antofagasta |
| Nevado de los Piuquenes | 6,019 | 19,747 | Santiago Metropolitan |
| Nevado San Francisco | 6,016 | 19,738 | Atacama |

== Mountains by region ==
=== Arica and Parinacota Region ===
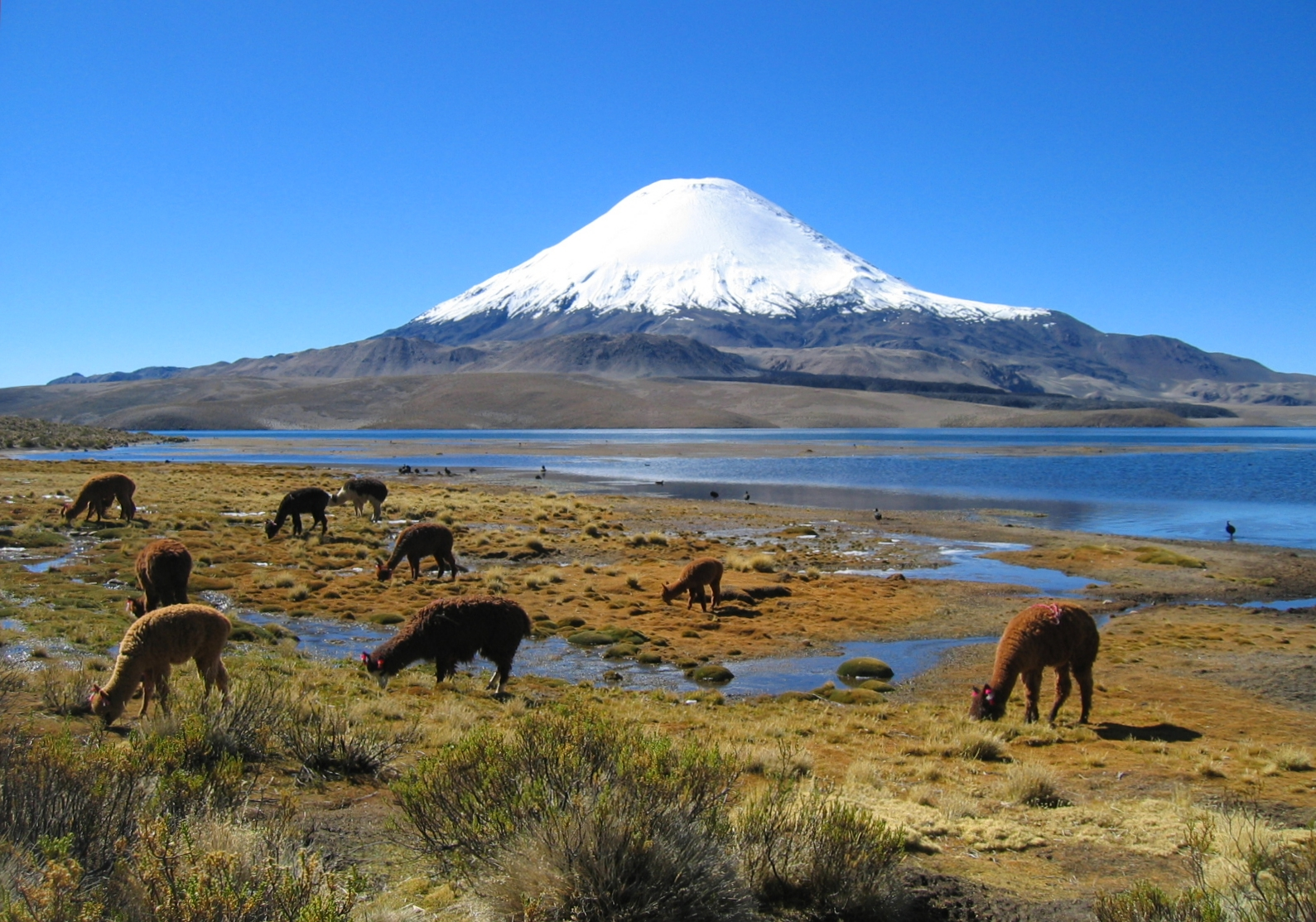
Parinacota Volcano

- Acotango
- Aritinca
- Capurata
- Guallatiri
- Parinacota
- Pomerape
- Taapaca
- Tacora

=== Tarapacá Region ===
- Alto Toroni
- Irruputuncu
- Isluga

=== Antofagasta Region ===
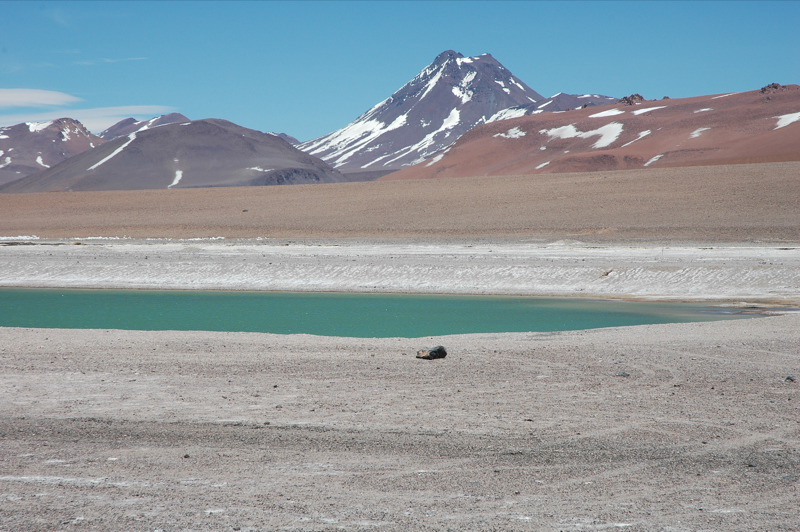
Acamarachi

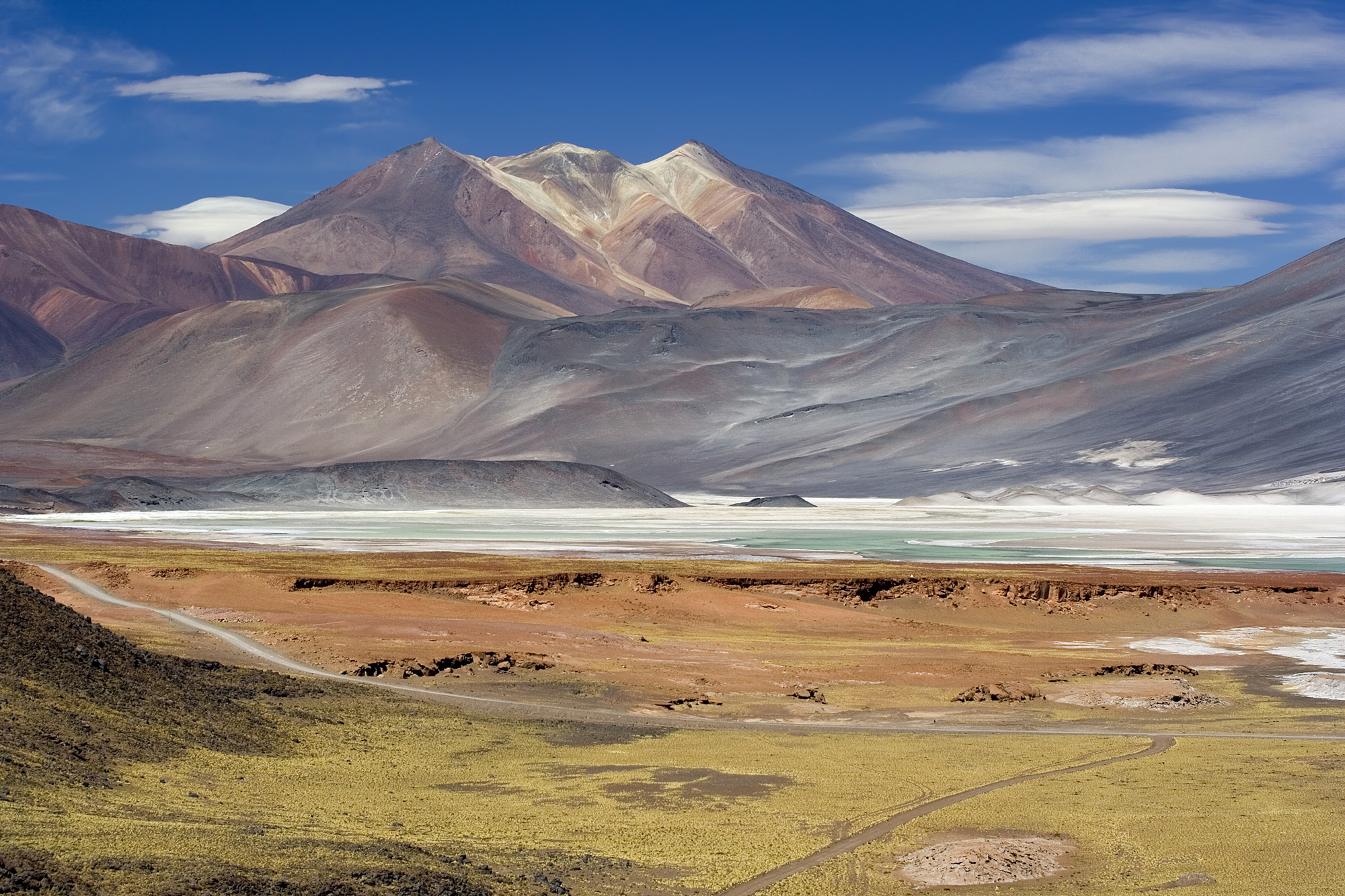
Cerros de Incahuasi

- Acamarachi
- Aguas Calientes
- Aucanquilcha
- Azufre
- Caichinque
- Chiliques
- Colachi
- Colorado
- Escorial
- Guayaques
- Incahuasi
- Juriques
- Lascar
- Lastarria
- Licancabur
- Linzor
- Llullaillaco
- Minchincha
- Miñiques
- Miño
- Miscanti
- Olca
- Ollagüe
- Palpana
- Paranal
- Paruma
- Pular
- Puntas Negras
- Putana
- Quimal
- Sairecabur
- Salín
- San Pablo
- San Pedro
- Socompa
- Toco
- Tocorpuri
- Zapaleri

=== Atacama Region ===
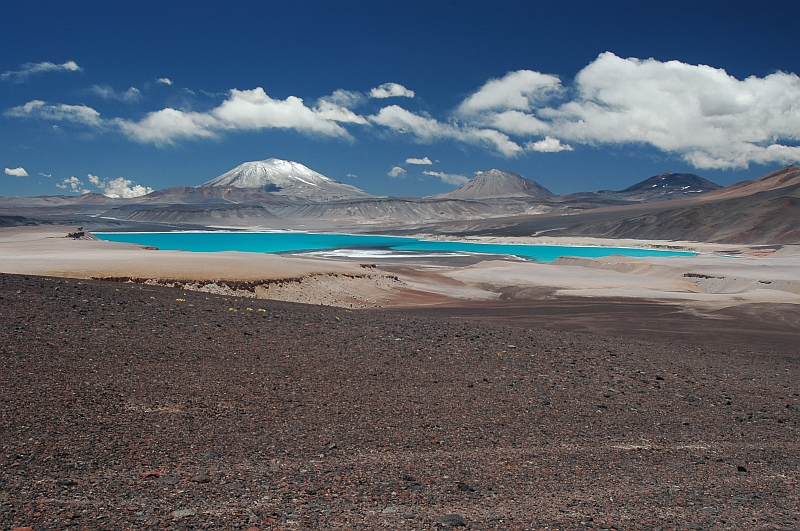
Nevado de Incahuasi

- Barrancas Blancas
- Azufre
- Bayo
- Colorados
- Copiapó
- El Muerto
- El Ermitaño
- El Fraile
- El Toro
- Falso Azufre
- Incahuasi
- Mulas Muertas
- Ojos del Salado
- Peña Blanca
- San Francisco
- Sierra Nevada de Lagunas Bravas
- Solo
- Tres Cruces
- Tres Quebradas
- Vicuñas

=== Coquimbo Region ===
- Las Tórtolas
- Olivares

=== Valparaíso Region ===
- Alto de los Leones
- Cerro de Los Inocentes
- Juncal

=== Santiago Metropolitan Region ===
- Arenas
- El Morado
- El Plomo
- Cerro Leonera (4,954 m)
- Cerro San Ramón
- Marmolejo
- Plomo
- Risopatrón
- San José
- Tupungatito
- Tupungato

=== O'Higgins Region ===
- Alto de los Arrieros
- Palomo
- Tinguiririca

=== Maule Region ===
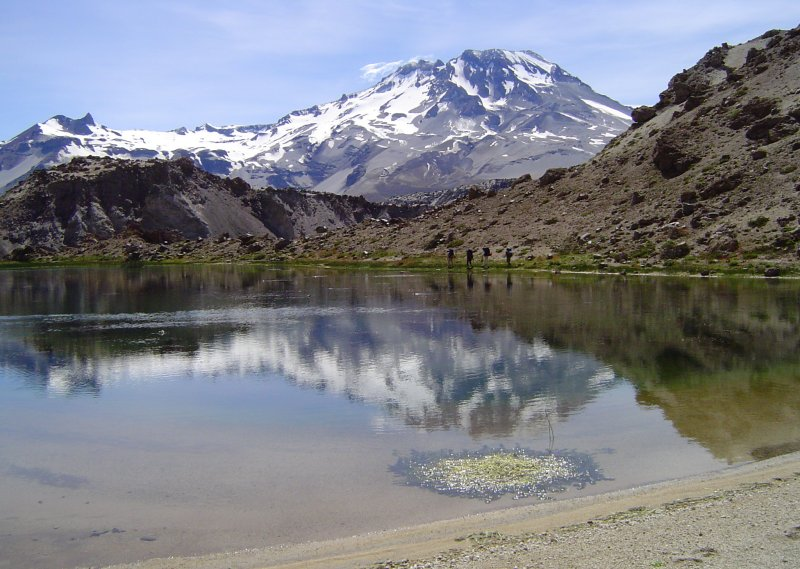
Descabezado Grande

- Azul
- Descabezado Chico
- Descabezado Grande
- Longaví
- Planchón-Peteroa

=== Bío-Bío Region ===
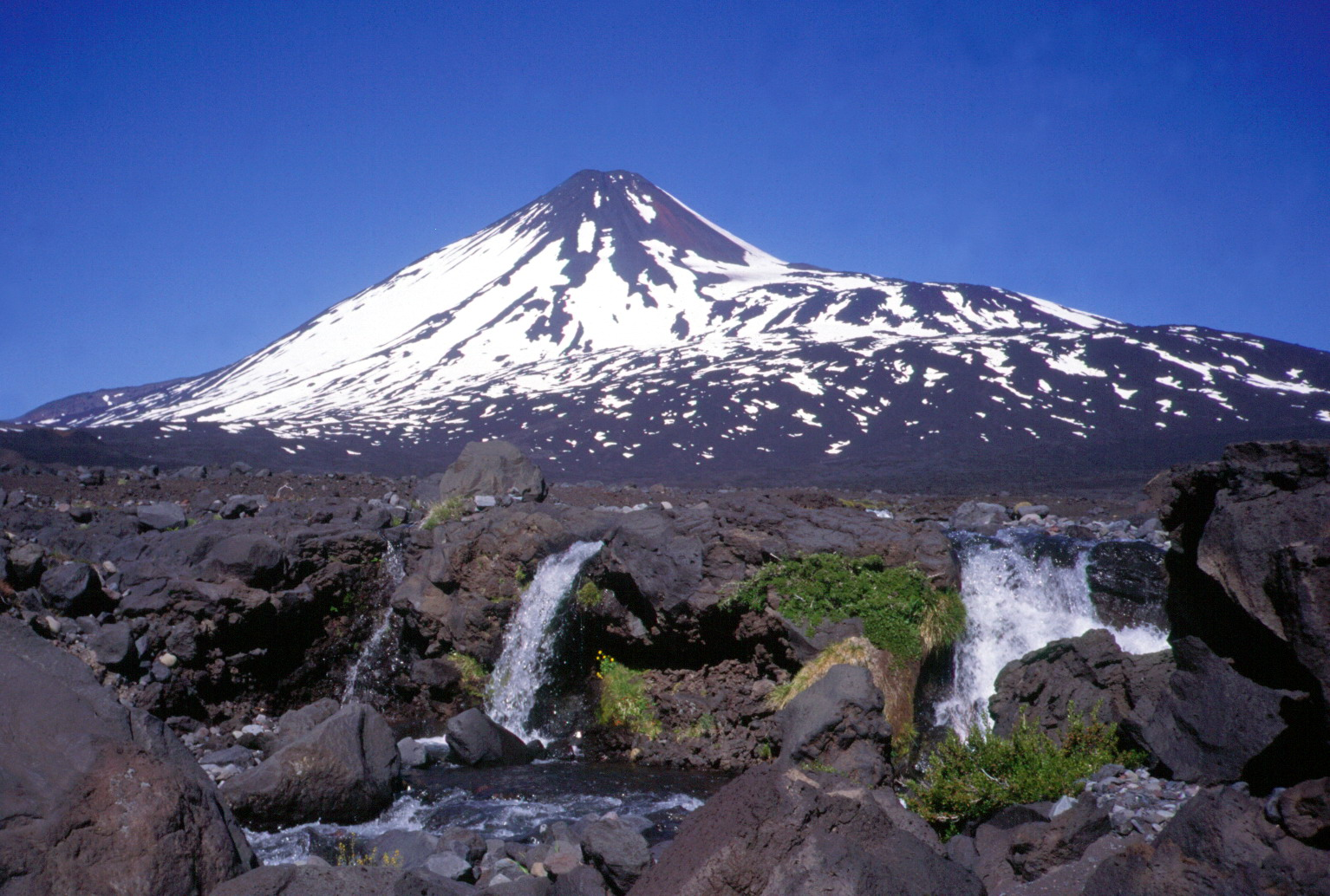
Antuco

- Antuco
- Callaqui
- Nevados de Chillán
- Copahue
- Sierra Velluda

=== Araucanía Region ===
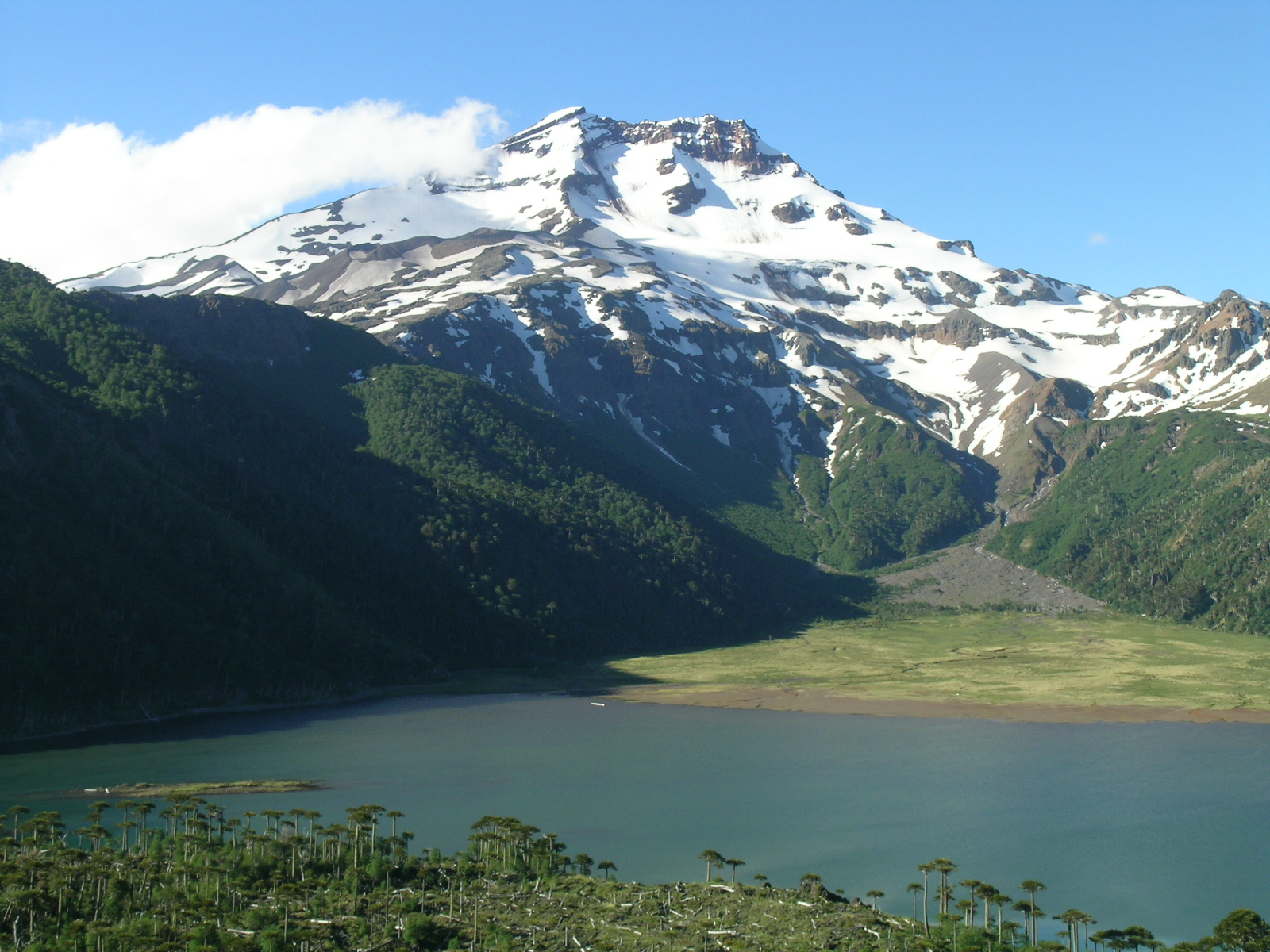
Tolhuaca

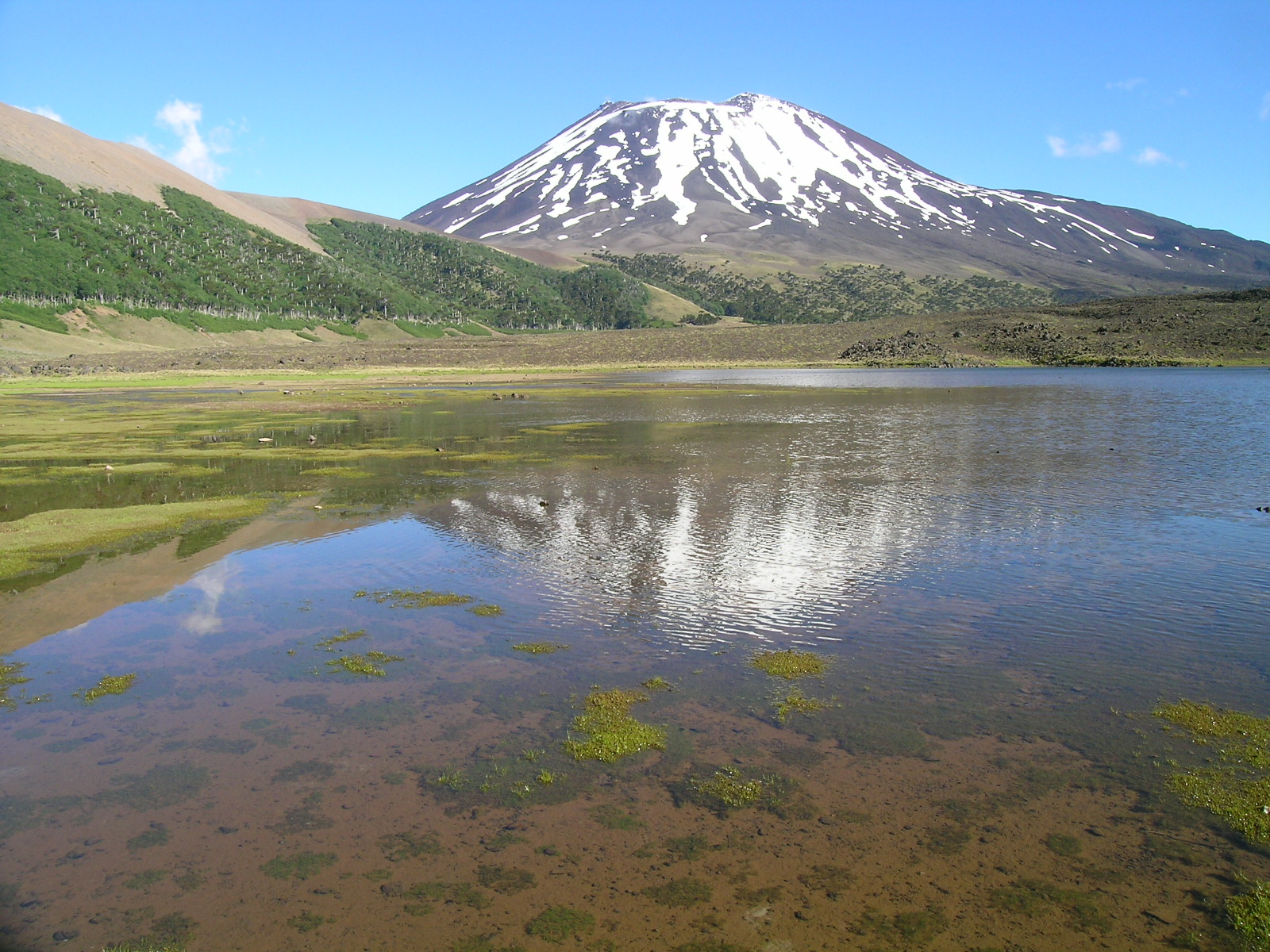
Lonquimay

- Lanín - highest mountain in Araucanía Region
- Llaima
- Lonquimay
- Quetrupillán
- Sierra Nevada
- Sollipulli
- Tolhuaca
- Villarrica

=== Los Ríos Region ===
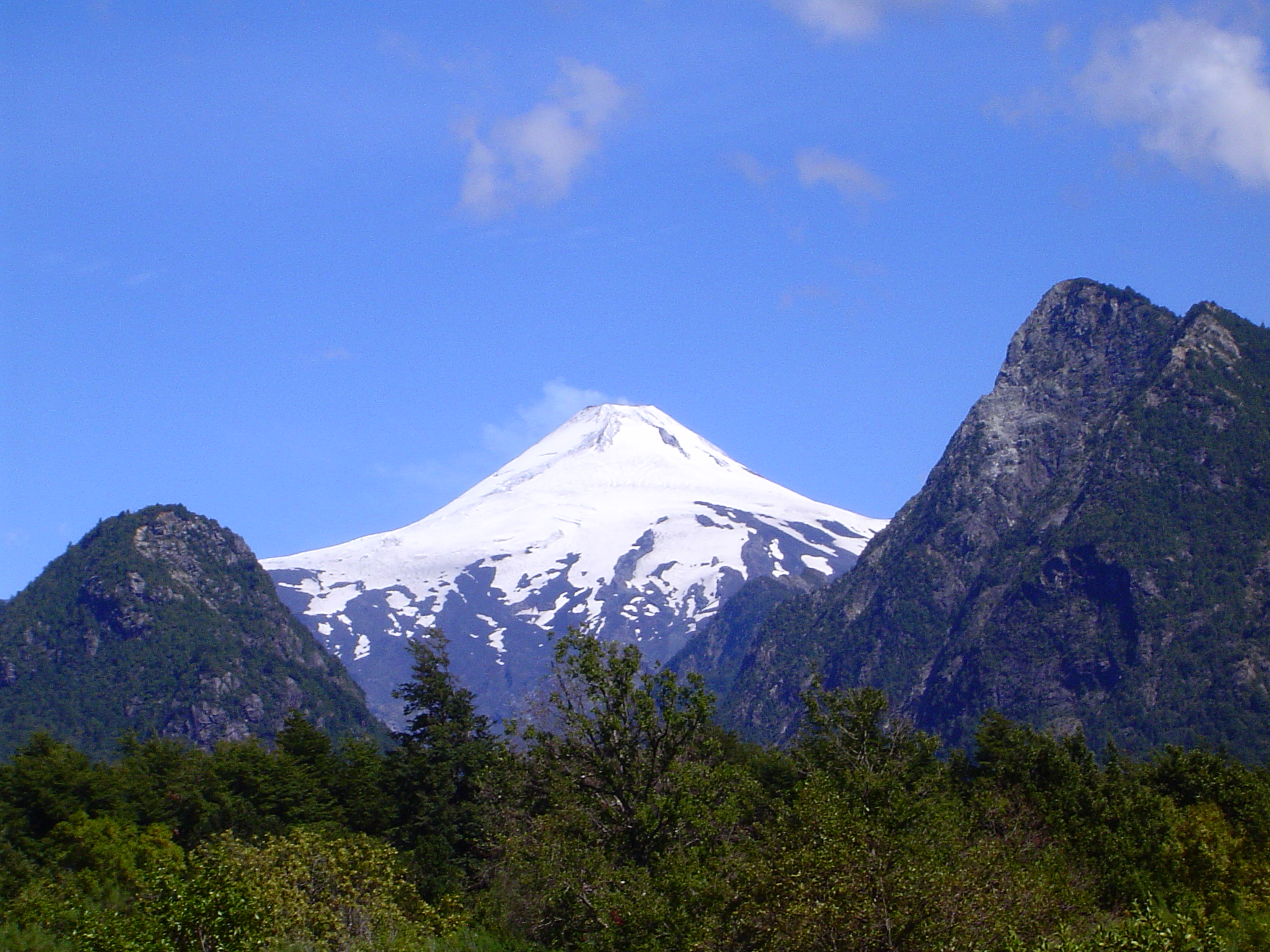
Villarrica

- Villarrica - highest mountain in Los Ríos Region
- Cacho del Toro
- Carrán
- Caulle
- Maltusado
- Lipinza
- Mocho-Choshuenco
- Nevado Las Agujas
- Oncol
- Paillahuinte
- Puyehue
- Trafa
- Tralcán

=== Los Lagos Region ===
- Antillanca
- Calbuco
- Corcovado
- Hornopirén
- Michinmahuida
- Osorno
- Puntiagudo
- Tronador - highest mountain in Los Lagos Region
- Yanteles
- Yate

=== Aisén Region ===
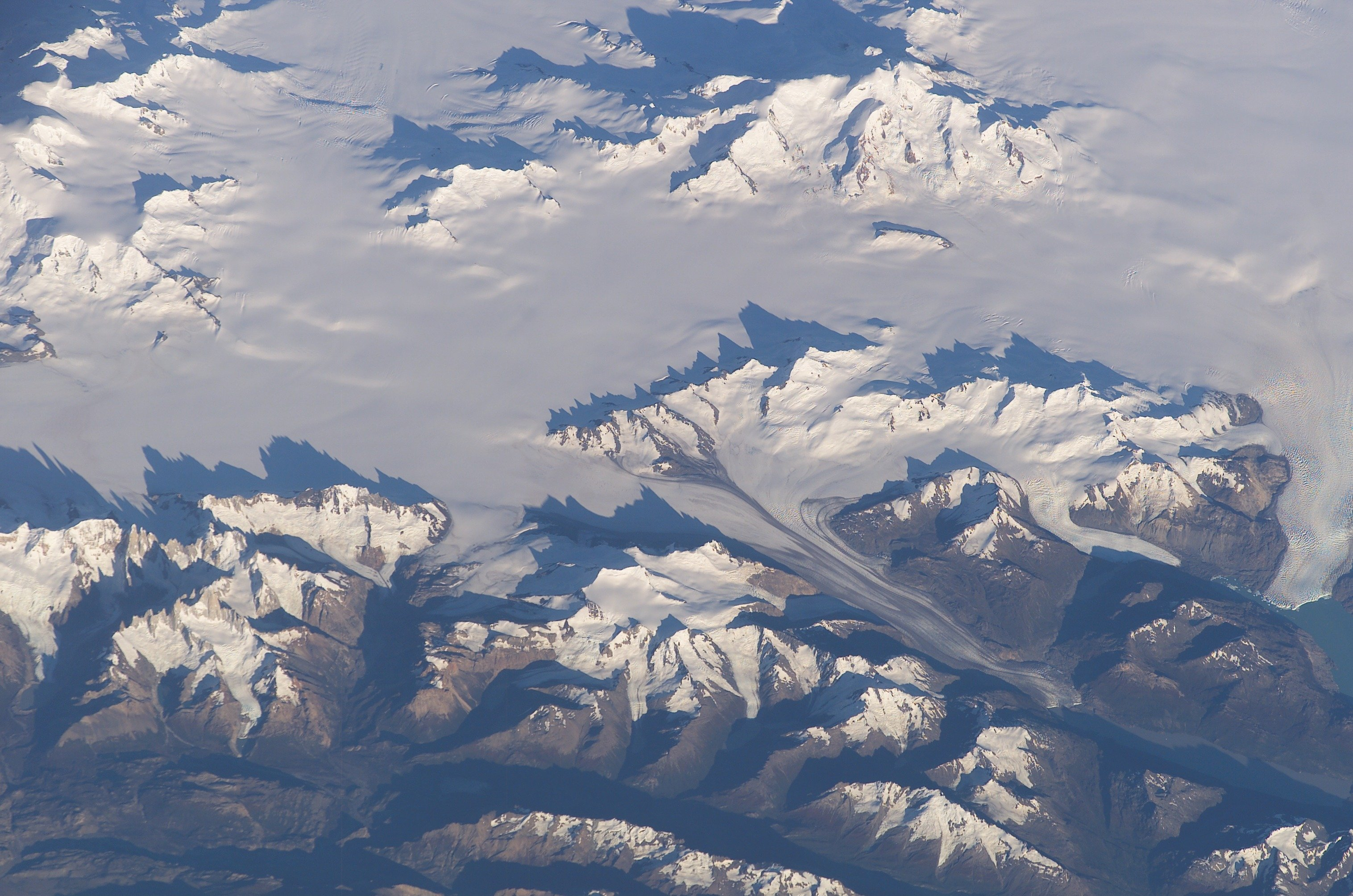
Lautaro

- Arenales
- Barros Arana
- Castillo
- Hudson
- Lautaro
- Macá
- Melimoyu
- Mentolat
- Pared Norte
- Puyuhuapi
- San Lorenzo
- San Valentín - highest mountain in Aysén Region
- Steffen

=== Magallanes and Antártica Chilena Region ===
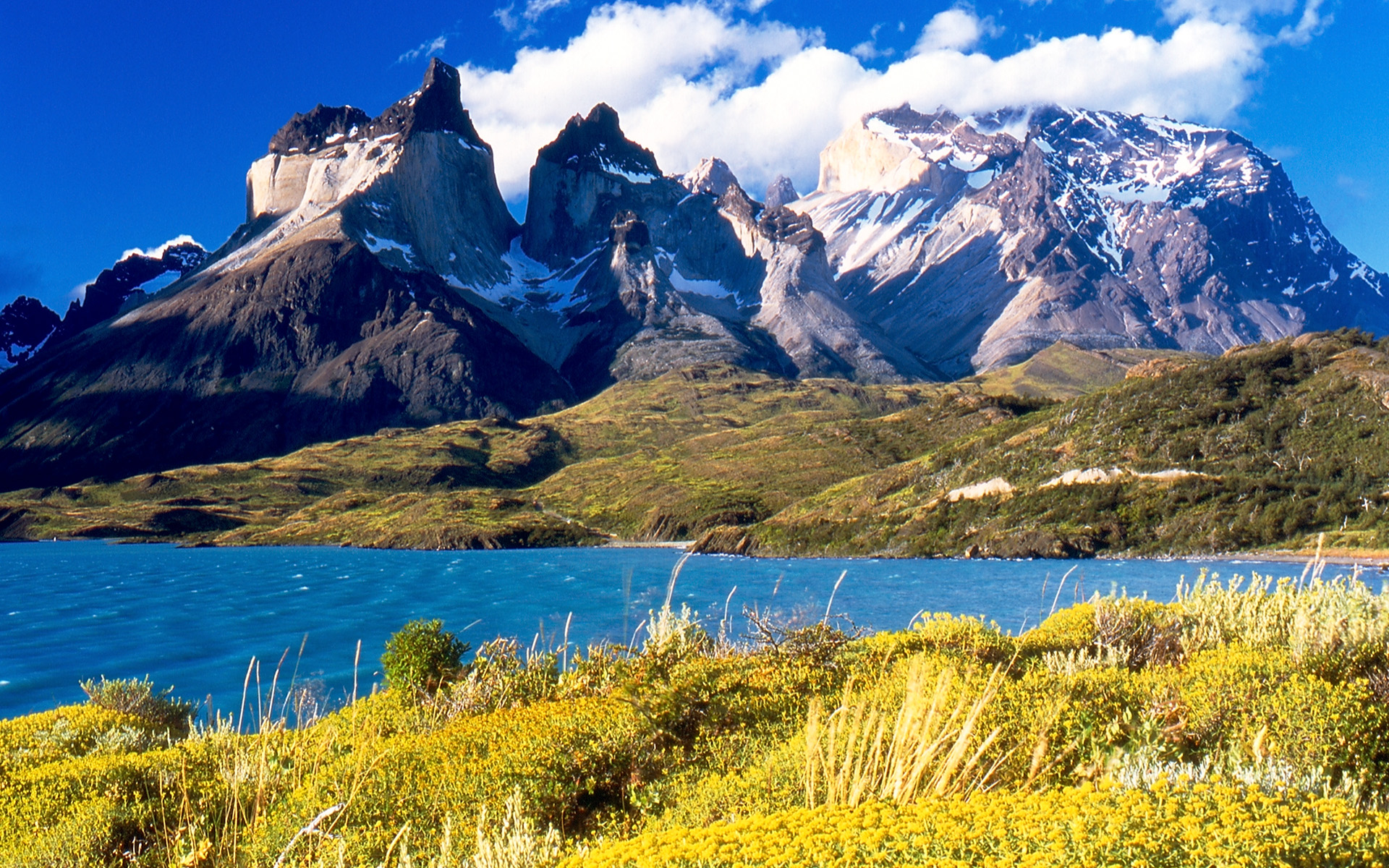
Cuernos del Paine

- Aguilera
- Balmaceda
- Burney
- Castillo Dynevor
- Cerro Paine Grande
- Darwin
- Fitz Roy - highest mountain in Magallanes Region
- Sarmiento
- Tarn
- Torre
