= Monte Parofes =

Mountain in Argentina

Parofes
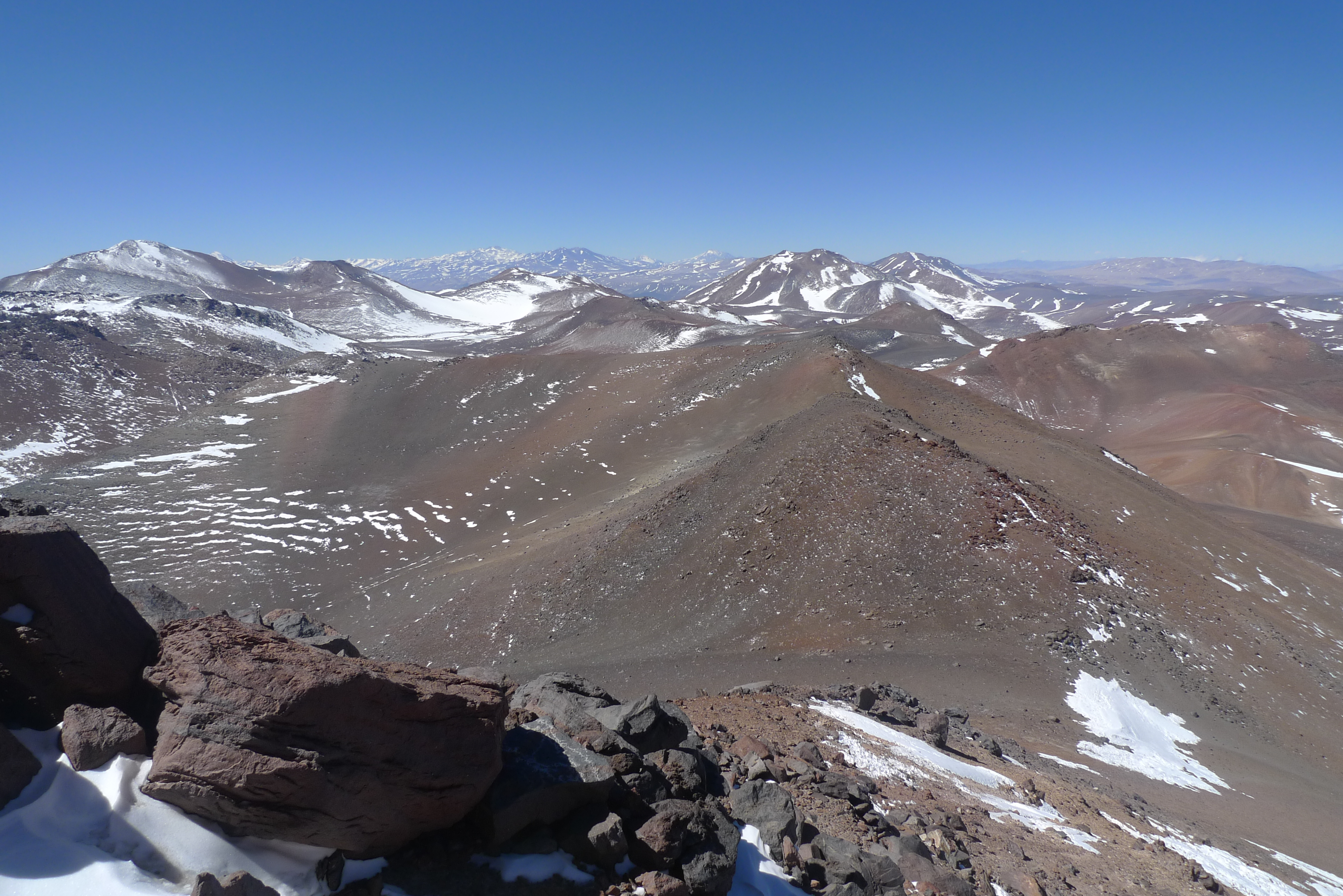
- Monte Parofes

Highest point
- Elevation: 5,823 m (19,104 ft).
- Prominence: 580
- Parent peak: Pissis
- Coordinates: 27°53′13.92″S 068°40′47.28″W

Geography
- Location within Argentina
- Country: Argentina
- Parent range: Puna de Atacama, Andes

Climbing
- First ascent: 2015 - Maximo Kausch (Argentina) and Pedro Hauck (Brazil)

Parofes is a mountain in Argentina. It has a height of 5,823 metres (19,104 ft). It's located at La Rioja Province, Vinchina department, at the Puna de Atacama. Its name is from the Brazilian mountaineer Paulo Roberto Felipe Schmidt, who died in 2015 due to leukemia. Until 2015 this peak was unclimbed and unnamed. However the mountaineers Maximo Kausch and Pedro Hauck, climbed and named it in 2015.

== Elevation ==
Based on the elevation provided by the available Digital elevation models, SRTM filled with ASTER (5823m), TanDEM-X(5864m), Parofes seems to be 5823 meters above sea level.

The height of the nearest key col is 5243 meters so its prominence is 580 meters. Parofes is listed as mountain, based on the Dominance system and its dominance is 9.96%. This information was obtained during a research by Suzanne Imber in 2014.
