= Alto San Juan =

Mountain in Argentina

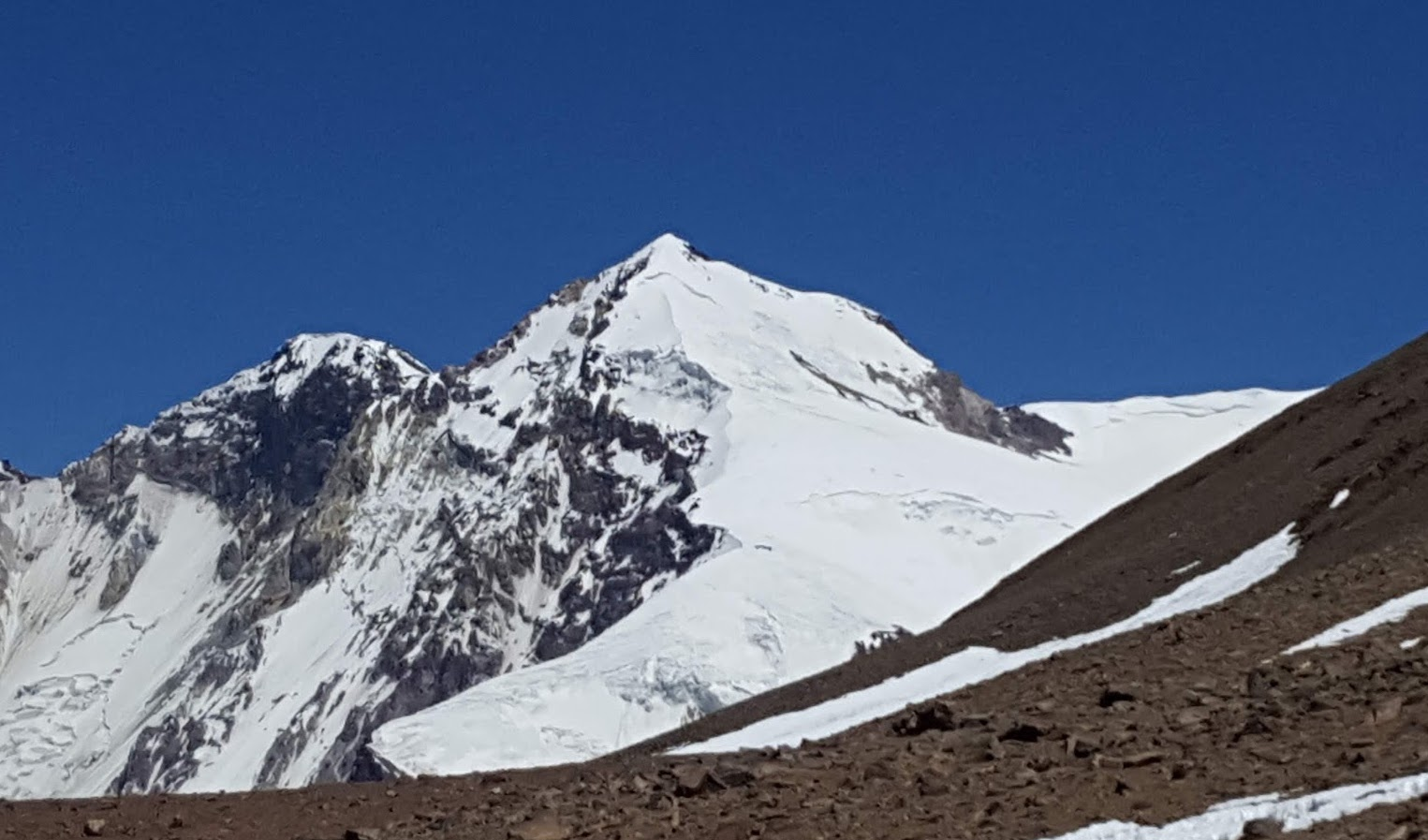

Highest point
- Elevation: 6,148 m (20,171 ft)
- Prominence: 906 m (2,972 ft)
- Parent peak: Tupungato
- Coordinates: 33°28′09.12″S 069°48′52.92″W

Geography
- Location within Chile
- Parent range: Central Andes

Climbing
- First ascent: 02/11/1944 - Wolfgang Foerster, Jorge Koester, Ludwig Krahl and Eberhard Meier (Germany)

Alto San Juan is a peak at the border of Argentina and Chile with an elevation of 6,148 metres (20,171 ft) metres. Alto San Juan is part of the Central Andes. Its territory is within the Argentinean protection area of Provincial Reserve for Multiple Use and Natural Recreation Manzano / Portillo de Piuquenes. Its slopes are within the administrative boundaries of the two cities: Argentinean city of Tunuyán (Mendoza) and Chilean commune of San José de Maipo (Cordillera).

== First Ascent ==
Alto was first climbed by Wolfgang Foerster, Jorge Koester, Ludwig Krahl and Eberhard Meier (Germany) November 2, 1944. The Argentinean side was first climbed by Suzanne Imber and Maximo Kausch in 2016.

== Elevation ==
It has an official height of 6148 meters. Other data from available digital elevation models: SRTM yields 6120 metres, ASTER 6103 metres, ASTER filled 6135 metres, TanDEM-X 6154 metres. The height of the nearest key col is 5242 meters, leading to a topographic prominence of 906 meters. Alto is considered a Mountain Massif according to the Dominance System and its dominance is 14.74%. Its parent peak is Tupungato and the Topographic isolation is 13 kilometers.
