= Tipas =

Mountain in Argentina

Walther Penck
- Tipas or Cazadero Grande
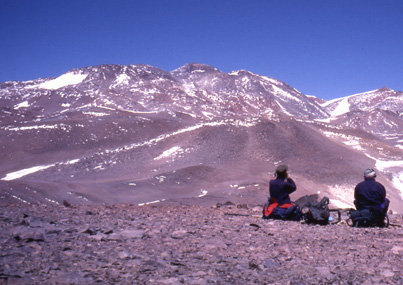
- Cazadero (or Tipas) from the east

Highest point
- Elevation: 6,670 m (21,880 ft)
- Prominence: 651 metres (2,136 ft)
- Parent peak: Ojos del Salado
- Coordinates: 27°11′45.96″S 068°33′38.88″W

Geography
- Location within Argentina
- Location: Argentina
- Parent range: Puna de Atacama, Andes

Geology
- Rock age: Holocene
- Mountain type: Complex volcano
- Last eruption: Unknown

Climbing
- First ascent: 14/12/1970 - Sergio Kunstmann, Pedro Rosende (Chile) and Takaya Takeshita (Japan)
- Easiest route: Hike, east side from El Arenal

Cerro Walther Penck (also known as Cerro Cazadero or Cerro Tipas) is a massive complex volcano in the Andes, located in northwestern Argentina, Catamarca Province, Tinogasta Department, at the Puna de Atacama. It is just southwest of Ojos del Salado, the highest volcano in the world. Walther Penck itself is perhaps the third highest active volcano in the world.

== Vulcanism ==
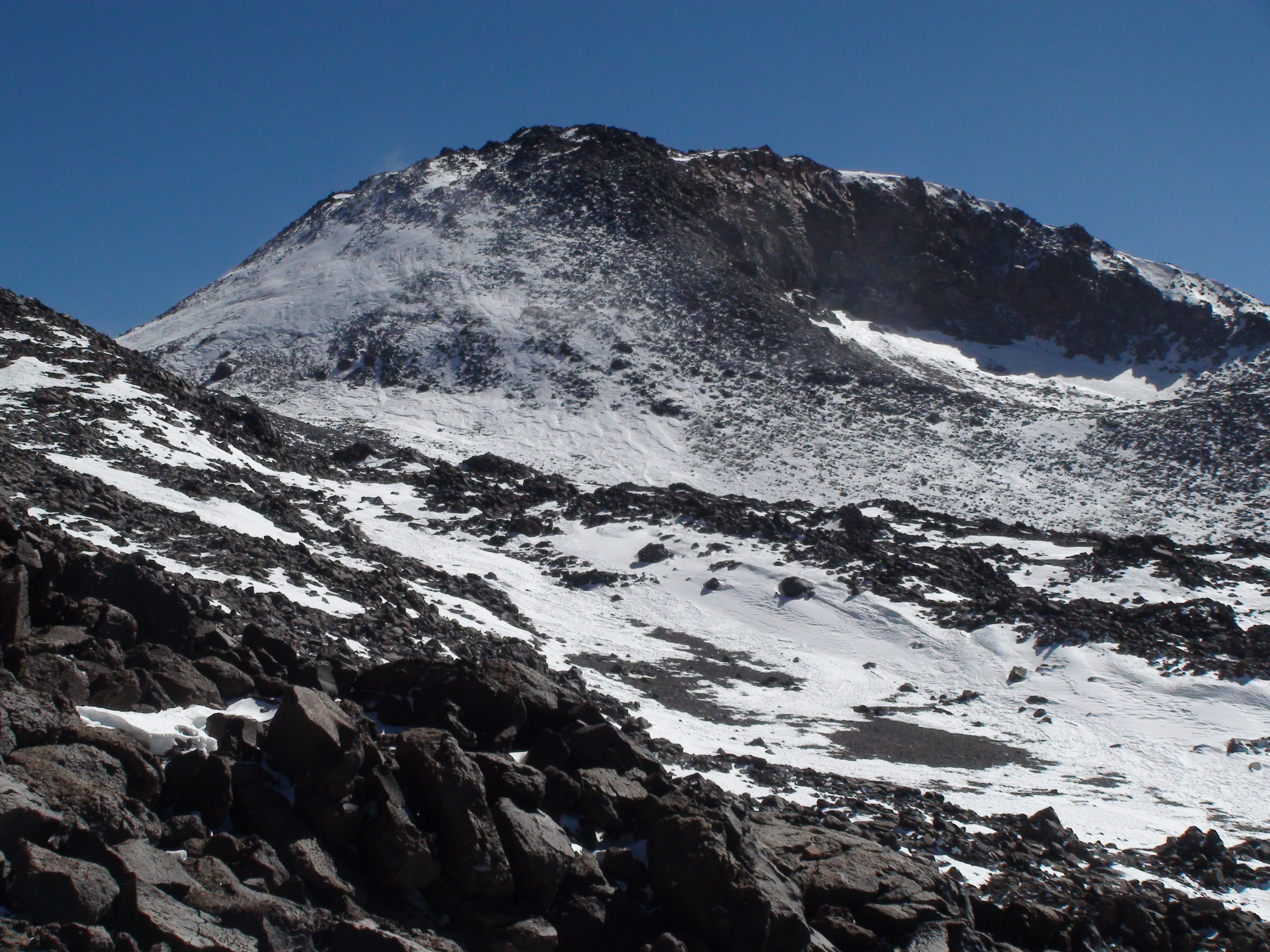
View of the main summit from central summit plateau

The complex covers a surface area of 25 square kilometres (9.7 sq mi), it consists of stratovolcanoes, lava domes, and lava flows. There are reports of fumarolic activity, and de Silva and Francis (1991) considered that the volcano was last active in the Holocene. Crater lakes with a smell of sulfur were reported in 2013. The Tipas-Cerro Bayo complex was active 2.9-1.2 million years ago with dacites and rhyolites. Magma composition is typical for Andean stratovolcanoes. Tomographic studies of the underlying crust indicate a pattern of seismic attenuation beneath Tipas.

== Elevation ==
It has an official height of 6658 meters, however, based on the elevation provided by the available Digital elevation models, SRTM (6663m), ASTER (6627m), SRTM filled with ASTER (6663m), TanDEM-X(6699m), and also a handheld GPS survey by Maximo Kausch on 04/2013 (6688 meters), Walther Penck is about 6670 meters above sea level.

The height of the nearest key col is 6019 meters. so its prominence is 651 meters. Walther Penck is listed as mountain, based on the Dominance system and its dominance is 9.76%. Its parent peak is Ojos del Salado and the Topographic isolation is 9.8 kilometers. This information was obtained during a research by Suzanne Imber in 2014.

== See also ==
- List of volcanoes in Argentina
