= Cerro El Muerto =

Mountain in Argentina

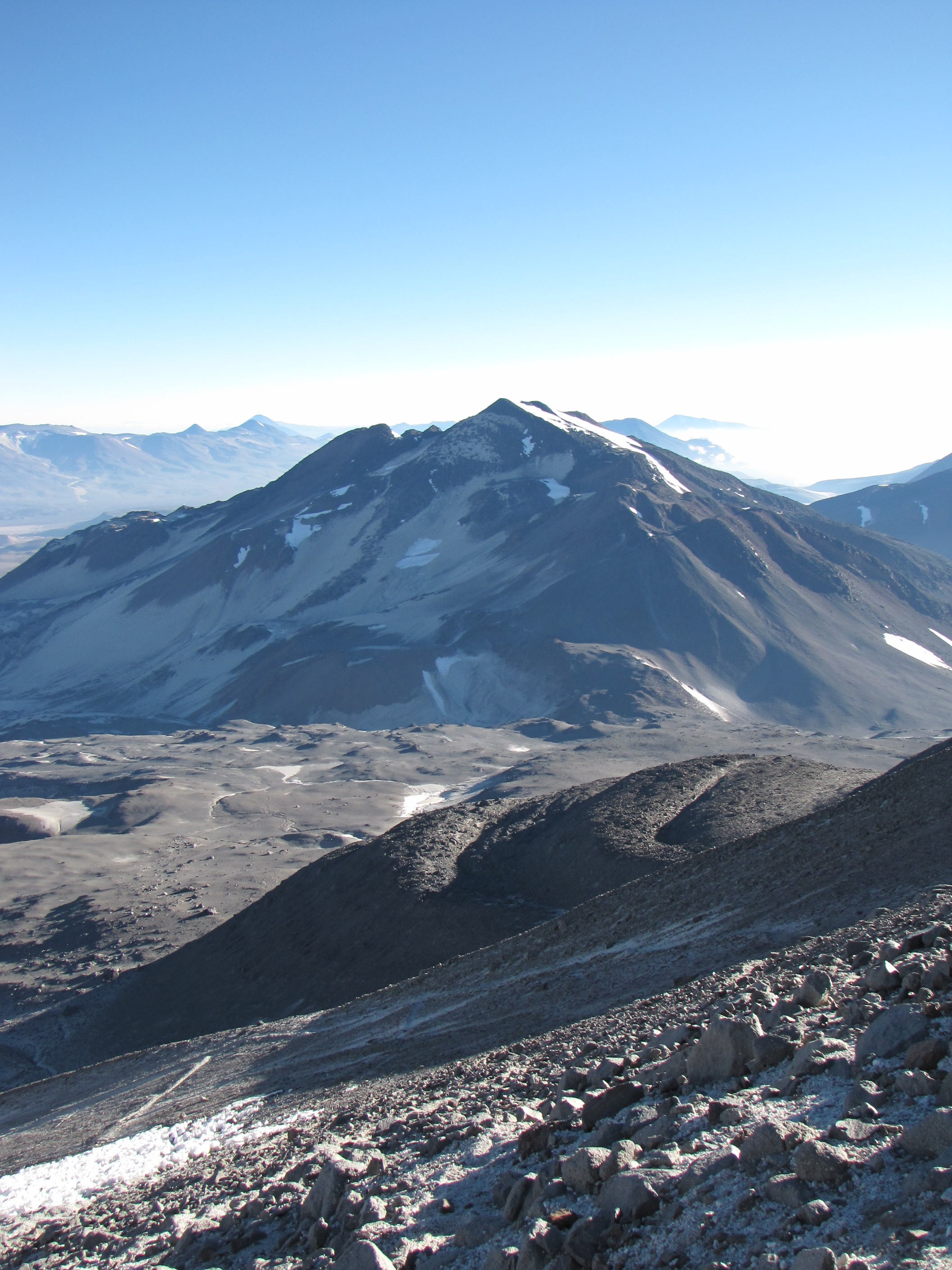
- Cerro El Muerto as seen from Ojos del Salado

Highest point
- Elevation: 6,510 m (21,360 ft)
- Prominence: 971 metres (3,186 ft)
- Parent peak: Ojos del Salado
- Coordinates: 27°3′28.44″S 068°29′03.12″W

Geography
- Location: Argentina-Chile
- Parent range: Puna de Atacama, Andes

Climbing
- First ascent: 23/02/1950 - Luis Alvarado, Jorge Balastino, Carlos and Oscar Alvarez (Chile)

== Location ==
Cerro el Muerto (sometimes El Muerto fully translated as The Dead One ") is a range or area at the border of Argentina and Chile. It has a height of 6,510 metres (21,358 ft). It's located at Atacama Region, Copiapó Province, at the Puna de Atacama. It only receives a handful of climbing attempts every year and most are from the Chilean side.

== Elevation ==
It has an official height of 6488 meters, however, based on the elevation provided by the available Digital elevation models, SRTM (6490m), ASTER (6488m), SRTM filled with ASTER (6490m), TanDEM-X(6533m), and also a handheld GPS survey by Maximo Kausch on 12/2010 (6519 meters), Muerto is about 6510 meters above sea level.

The height of the nearest key col is 5539 meters so its prominence is 971 meters. Its parent peak is Ojos del Salado and the Topographic isolation is 8 kilometers. This information was obtained during a research by Suzanne Imber in 2014.

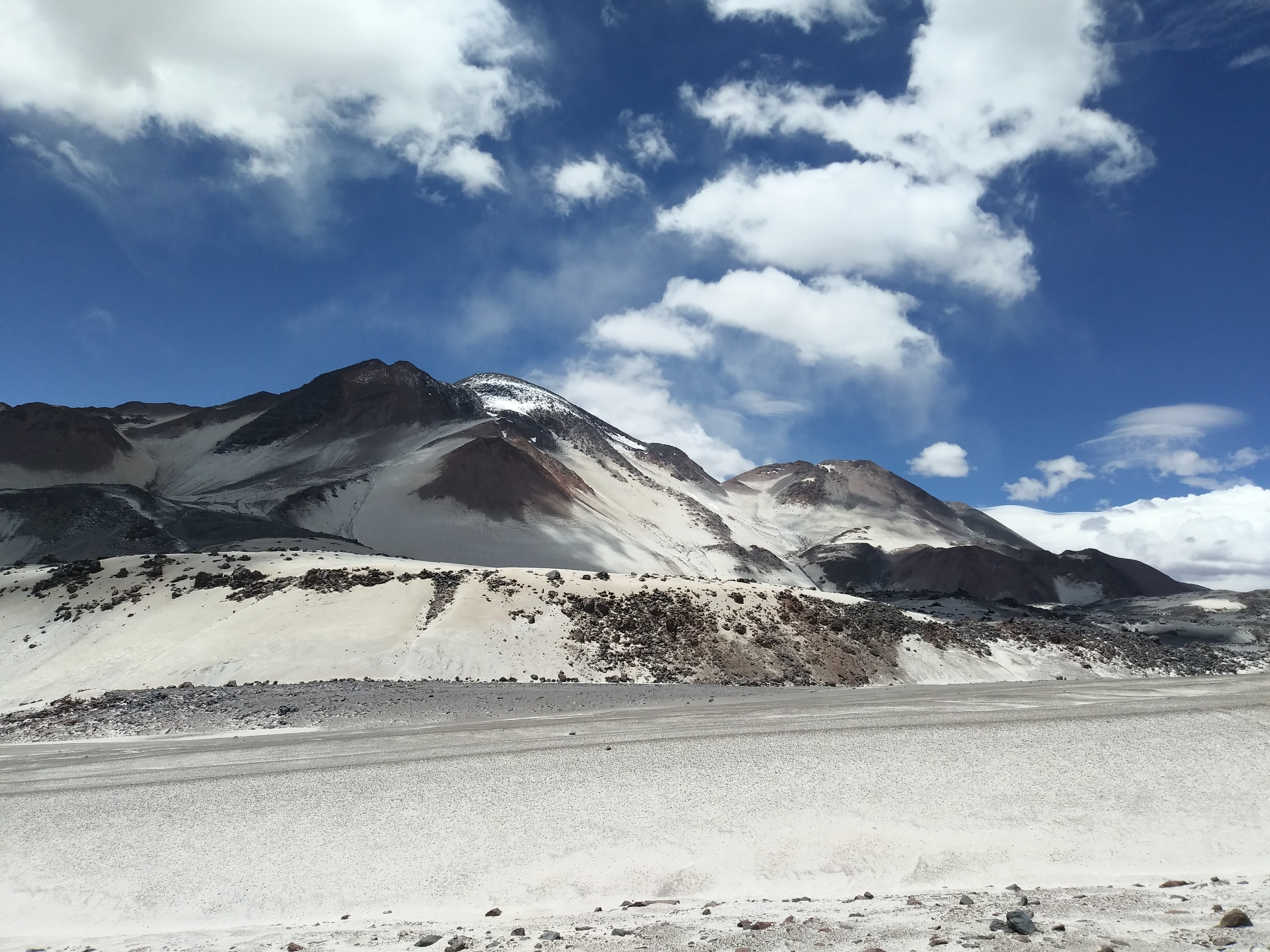
Western slopes of Cerro El Muerto during the southern summer

== See also ==
- List of mountains in Argentina
