= Reclus (Andes Mountains) =

Mountain massif in Argentina

- Location within Argentina

Highest point
- Elevation: 6,300 m (20,700 ft)
- Prominence: 798 m (2,618 ft)
- Parent peak: Bonete Chico
- Coordinates: 27°55′04.79″S 68°55′58.80″W

Geography
- Country: Argentina
- Department: Vinchina
- Parent range: Puna de Atacama, Andes

Climbing
- First ascent: 03/02/1986 - Johan Reinhard (USA) and Louis Glausser (Switzerland)

Reclus is a mountain subgroup or massif, in Argentina. It has a height of 6,300 metres (20,669 ft). It is located at La Rioja Province, Vinchina department, at the Puna de Atacama. Reclus is completely within Argentine territory. This peak was named after the French geographer Jacques Élisée Reclus.

== First ascent ==
The first ascents were made by native Andean people, who built structures upon the summit. The first summit by Europeans was Johan Reinhard (USA) and Louis Glausser (Switzerland) in 03/02/1986.

== Elevation ==
Based on the elevation provided by the available Digital elevation models, SRTM (6274m), ASTER (6251m), SRTM filled with ASTER (6274m), ALOS (6251m), TanDEM-X(6318m), and also a handheld GPS survey by Maximo Kausch on 10/2012 (6285 metres), Reclus is about 6300 metres above sea level.

The height of the nearest key col is 5,502 m (18,051 ft). so its prominence is 798 metres. Reclus is listed as mountain subgroup or massif, based on the Dominance system and its dominance is 12.67%. Its parent peak is Bonete Chico and the Topographic isolation is 20.7 km. This information was obtained during a research by Suzanne Imber in 2014.
