= Cerro Ameghino =

Mountain in Argentina

Ameghino
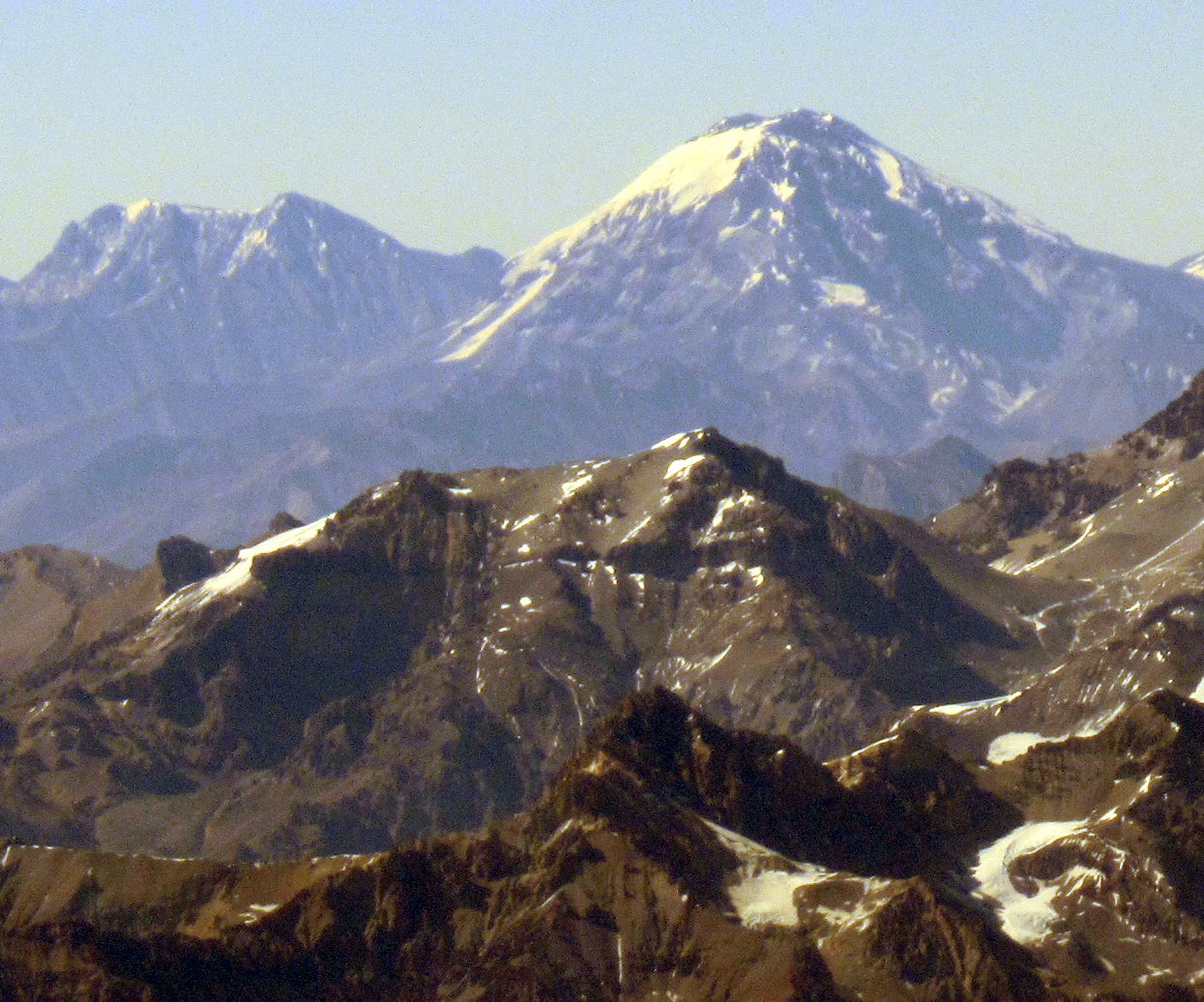

Highest point
- Elevation: 5,950 m (19,520 ft)
- Prominence: 585 metres (1,919 ft)
- Parent peak: Aconcagua
- Coordinates: 32°37′32.52″S 069°58′37.55″W

Geography
- Location within Argentina
- Country: Argentina
- Parent range: Central Andes, Andes

Climbing
- First ascent: 13881 - Juan Semper y Ángel Landi (Argentina)

Ameghino is a mountain in Argentina. It has a height of 5,950 metres (19,521 ft).

== Location ==
It is located at Las Heras Department, Mendoza Province, at the Central Andes.

== Elevation ==
Based on the elevation provided by the available Digital elevation models, SRTM (5931m), SRTM2 (5935m), ASTER (5900m), SRTM filled with ASTER (5935m), TanDEM-X(5956m), Ameghino is about 5950 meters above sea level.

The height of the nearest key col is 5365 meters, so its prominence is 585 meters. Ameghino is listed as mountain, based on the Dominance system and its dominance is 9.83%. Its parent peak is Aconcagua and the Topographic isolation is 4.4 kilometers. This information was obtained during a research by Suzanne Imber in 2014.
