= Polleras =

Mountain in the Andes

- Location within Argentina

Highest point
- Elevation: 5,993 m (19,662 ft)
- Prominence: 1,436 metres (4,711 ft)
- Parent peak: Nevado del Plomo
- Coordinates: 33°14′45.60″S 069°55′04.80″W

Geography
- Parent range: Argentine Andes, Andes

Climbing
- First ascent: Feb 5th 1908 - Friedrich Reichert (Germany)

Cerro Polleras is a mountain in the Andes at the border of Argentina and Chile with an elevation of 5,993 metres (19,662 ft) metres. Polleras is within the Principal Cordillera of the Andes. Its territory is within the Argentine protected area of Tupungato Volcano Provincial Park. It is on the border of two provinces: Argentinean province of Mendoza and Chilean province of Cordillera. Its slopes are within the territory of two cities: Argentinean city of Luján de Cuyo and Chilean commune of San José de Maipo.

== First Ascent ==
Polleras was first climbed by Friedrich Reichert (Germany) on February 5, 1908.

== Elevation ==
It has an official height of 5993 meters. Other data from available digital elevation models: SRTM yields 5868 metres, ASTER 5975 metres, ALOS 5975 metres. The height of the nearest key col is 4557 meters, leading to a topographic prominence of 1436 meters. Polleras is considered a Mountain Subrange according to the Dominance System and its dominance is 23.96%. Its parent peak is Nevado del Plomo and the Topographic isolation is 21 kilometers.
