= Negro Pabellón =

Mountain peak in Mendoza, Argentina

Negro
- Pabellon or Pabellón de Santa Clara
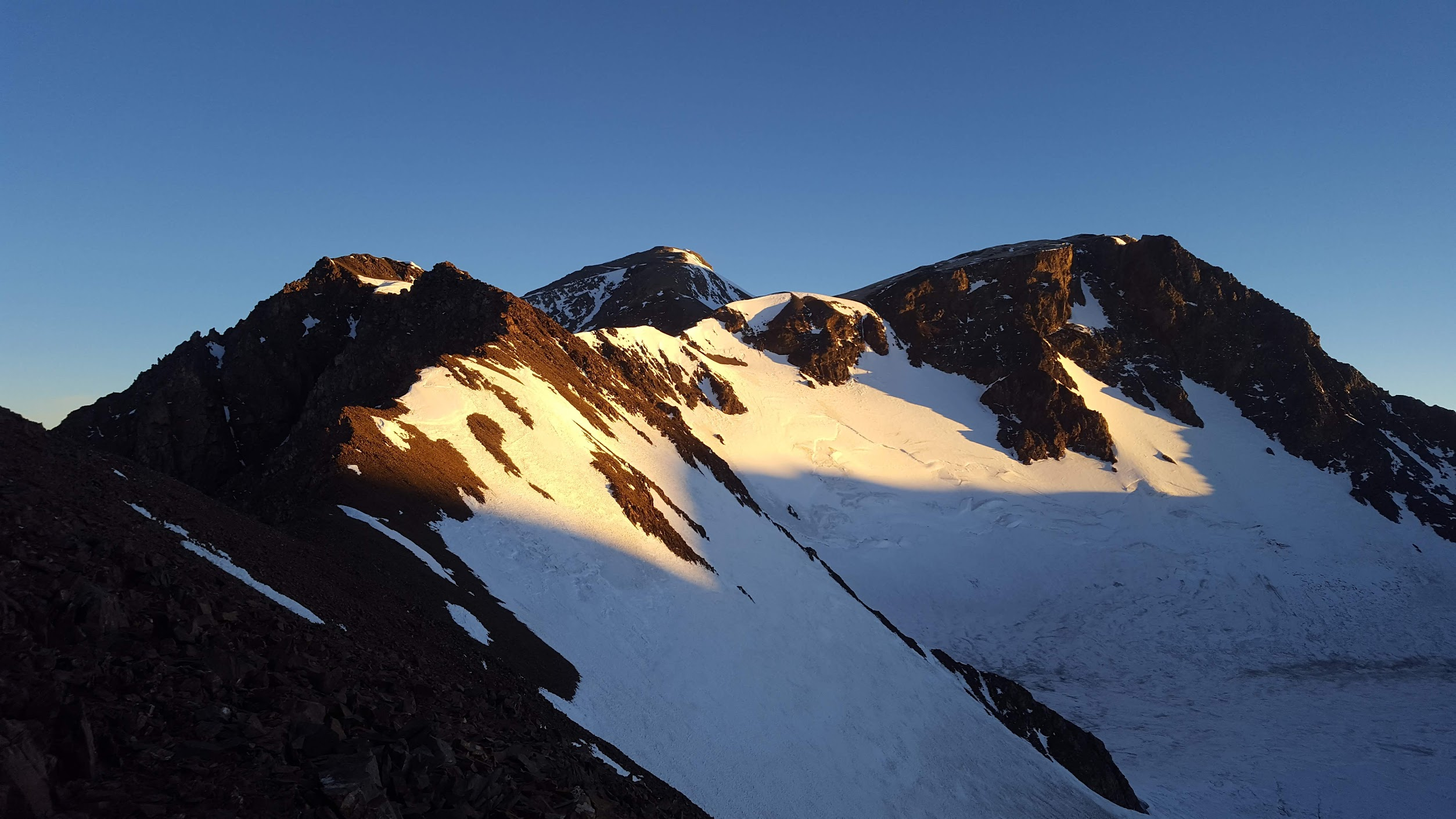
- Negro Pabellón from south side

Highest point
- Elevation: 6,090 m (19,980 ft)
- Prominence: 1,091 m (3,579 ft)
- Parent peak: Tupungato
- Coordinates: 33°27′00.00″S 069°42′08.27″W

Geography
- Location within Argentina
- Parent range: Central Andes, Cordón de las Delicias

Climbing
- First ascent: 03/04/1953 - Antonio Alméciga, Dante Bañón, Andres Garcia, Dante Maniero (Argentina)

Negro Pabellón (also called Pabellón or Pabellón de Santa Clara) is a peak in Mendoza, Argentina with an elevation of 6,090 metres (19,980 ft) metres. Negro Pabellón is within the Central Andes and is the highest at Cordón de las Delicias. Its territory is within the Argentinean protection area of Provincial Reserve for Multiple Use and Natural Recreation Manzano / Portillo de Piuquenes. Its slopes are within the administrative boundaries of the Argentinean city of Tunuyán.

== First Ascent ==
Negro was first climbed by Antonio Alméciga, Dante Bañón, Andres Garcia and Dante Maniero (Argentina) April 3, 1953.

== Elevation ==
It has an official height of 6157 meters. Other data from available digital elevation models: SRTM yields 6072 metres, SRTM2 6077 metres, ASTER 6033 metres and TanDEM-X 6106 metres.

The height of the nearest key col is 4999 meters, leading to a topographic prominence of 1091 meters. Negro Pabellón is considered a Mountain Massif according to the Dominance System and its dominance is 17.91%. Its parent peak is Tupungato and the Topographic isolation is 11.9 kilometers.
