= Cerro Tolosa =

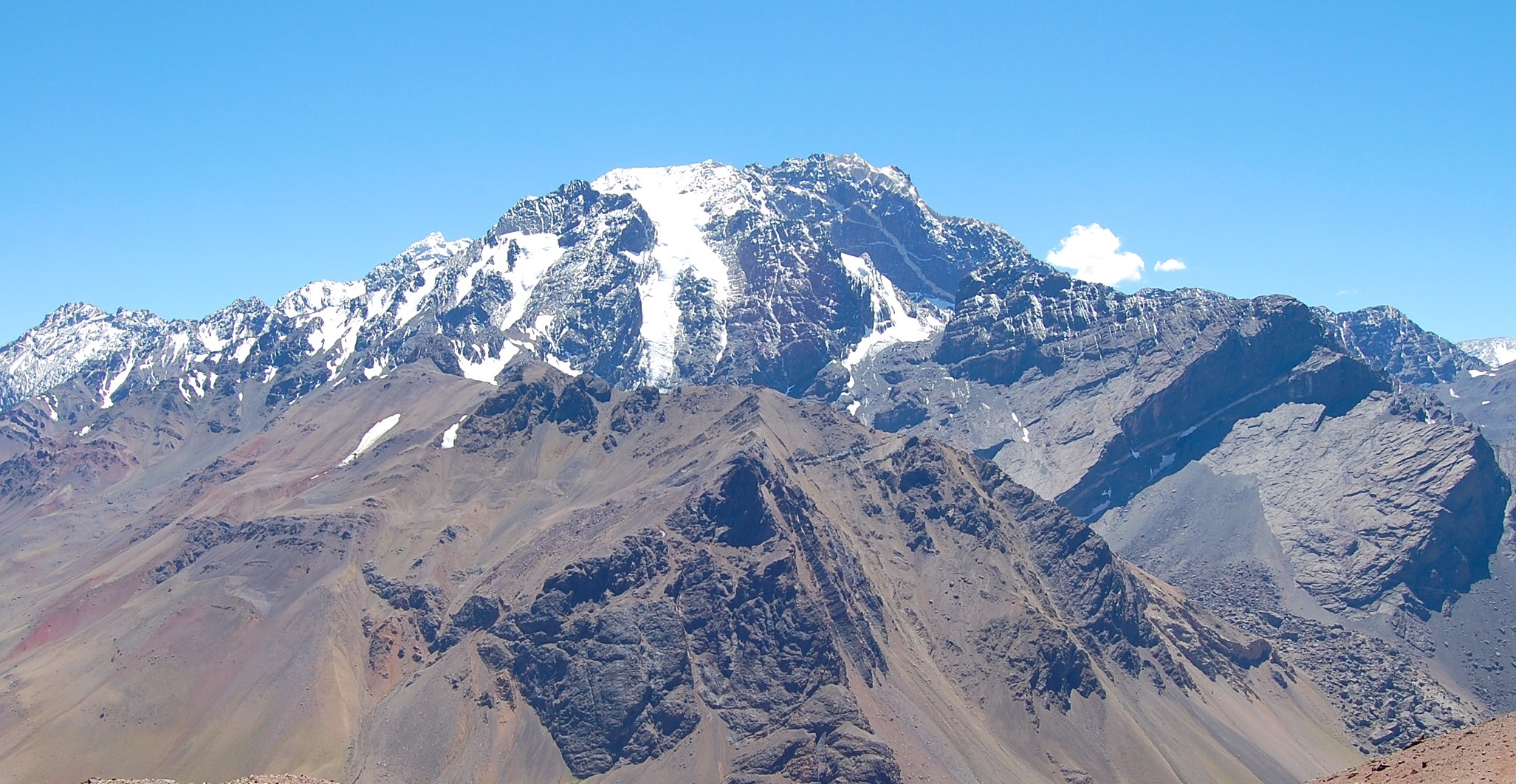
- Southwest aspect

Highest point
- Elevation: 5,432 m (17,822 ft)
- Prominence: 744 m (2,441 ft)
- Parent peak: Aconcagua
- Isolation: 8.37 km (5.20 mi)
- Coordinates: 32°46′10″S 70°01′58″W

Geography
- Location within Argentina Location within South America
- Interactive map of Cerro Tolosa
- Country: Argentina
- Province: Mendoza
- Protected area: Aconcagua Provincial Park
- Parent range: Andes

Climbing
- First ascent: 1903
- Easiest route: Scrambling

Cerro Tolosa is a mountain in Mendoza Province, Argentina.

== Description ==
Cerro Tolosa is a 5,432-meter-elevation (17,822-foot) summit in the Andes. The peak is located 110 kilometers (68 miles) west of the city of Mendoza, and 12.5 kilometers (7.77 miles) south of Aconcagua, in Aconcagua Provincial Park. Precipitation runoff from the mountain's slopes drains into tributaries the Mendoza River. Topographic relief is significant as the summit rises 2,250 meters (7,382 ft) above the Las Cuevas Valley in five kilometers (3.1 miles). The first ascent of the summit was made in 1903 by Baroness Nadine Lougonine von Meyendorff and Alois Pollinger. The nearest higher peak is Cerro Mirador, 8.37 kilometers (5.2 miles) to the north-northeast.

== Climate ==
According to the Köppen climate classification system, Cerro Tolosa is located in a tundra climate zone with cold, snowy winters, and cool summers. Weather systems are forced upward by the mountains (orographic lift), causing moisture to drop in the form of rain and snow. This climate supports the Glaciar del Hombre Cojo (Glacier of the Lame Man) on the south slope. The months of November through March offer the most favorable weather for climbing in this area.

== See also ==
- List of mountains in Argentina
