= Nevado Juncal =

Mountain in Argentina

Juncal
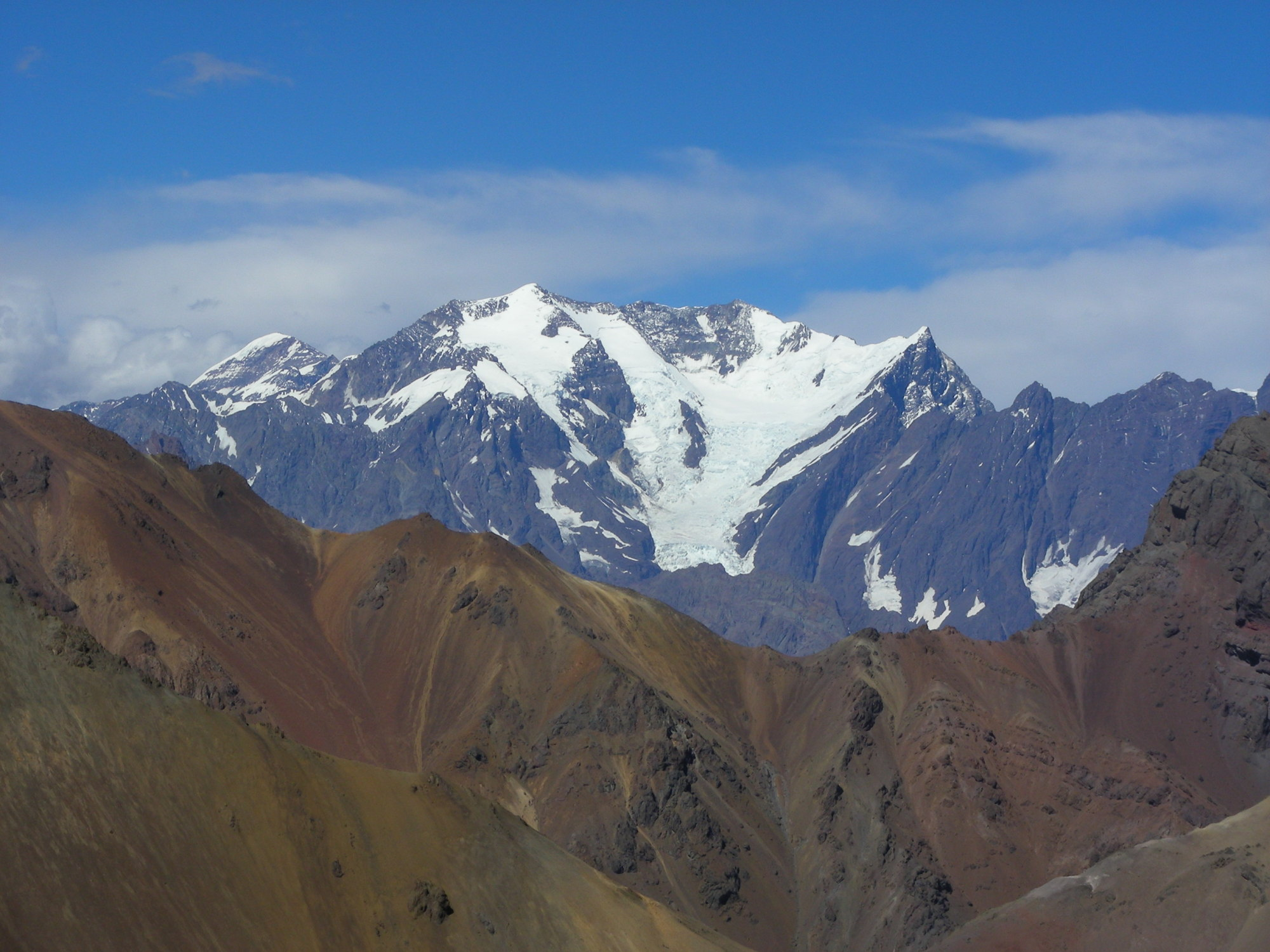

Highest point
- Elevation: 5,953 m (19,531 ft)
- Prominence: 833 metres (2,733 ft)
- Parent peak: Nevado del Plomo
- Coordinates: 33°3′10.44″S 070°6′07.20″W

Geography
- Location within Argentina
- Countries: Argentina and Chile
- Parent range: Central Andes, Andes

Climbing
- First ascent: 17/1/1911 - Federico Reichert (Germany), Robert Helbling (Switzerland) and Damasio Beíza (Chile).

Nevado Juncal is a mountain at the border of Argentina and Chile, at the head of Aconcagua Val. It has a height of 5,953 metres (19,531 ft). It is located at La Yesera, Los Andes Department, Valparaíso Region, at the Central Andes. The mountain hosts several glaciers including the Juncal Norte and Juncal Sur.

== Elevation ==
It has an official height of 5965 meters Based on the elevation provided by the available Digital elevation models, SRTM2 (5940m), ASTER (5918m), TanDEM-X(5905m with voids), Juncal is about 5953 meters above sea level.

The height of the nearest key col is 5120 meters, so its prominence is 833 meters. Juncal is listed as subgroup or massif, based on the Dominance system and its dominance is 13.99%. Its parent peak is Nevado del Plomo and the Topographic isolation is 6.6 kilometers. This information was obtained during a research by Suzanne Imber in 2014.
