= Medusa (mountain) =

Mountain in Argentina/Chile

- Location within Chile

Highest point
- Elevation: 6,130 m (20,110 ft)
- Prominence: 525 m (1,722 ft)
- Parent peak: Ojos del Salado
- Coordinates: 27°7′40.08″S 068°29′05.99″W

Geography
- Countries: Argentina and Chile
- Parent range: Puna de Atacama, Andes

Climbing
- First ascent: 22/01/1986 - Claudio Bravo (Argentina)

Medusa is a mountain at the border of Argentina and Chile. It has a height of 6,130 metres (20,112 ft). It's located at Catamarca Province, Tinogasta Department, at the Puna de Atacama. At the Chilean side, its shares territories with the commune of Copiapó.

== First Ascent ==
Medusa was first climbed by Claudio Bravo (Argentina) January 22, 1986.

== Elevation ==
Other data from available digital elevation models: SRTM yields 6119 metres, ASTER 6101 metres, and TanDEM-X 6163 metres. The height of the nearest key col is 5605 meters, leading to a topographic prominence of 525 meters. Medusa is considered a Mountain according to the Dominance System and its dominance is 8.56%. Its parent peak is Ojos del Salado and the Topographic isolation is 5.9 kilometers.
