= Cerro Arenas =

Mountain in Chile

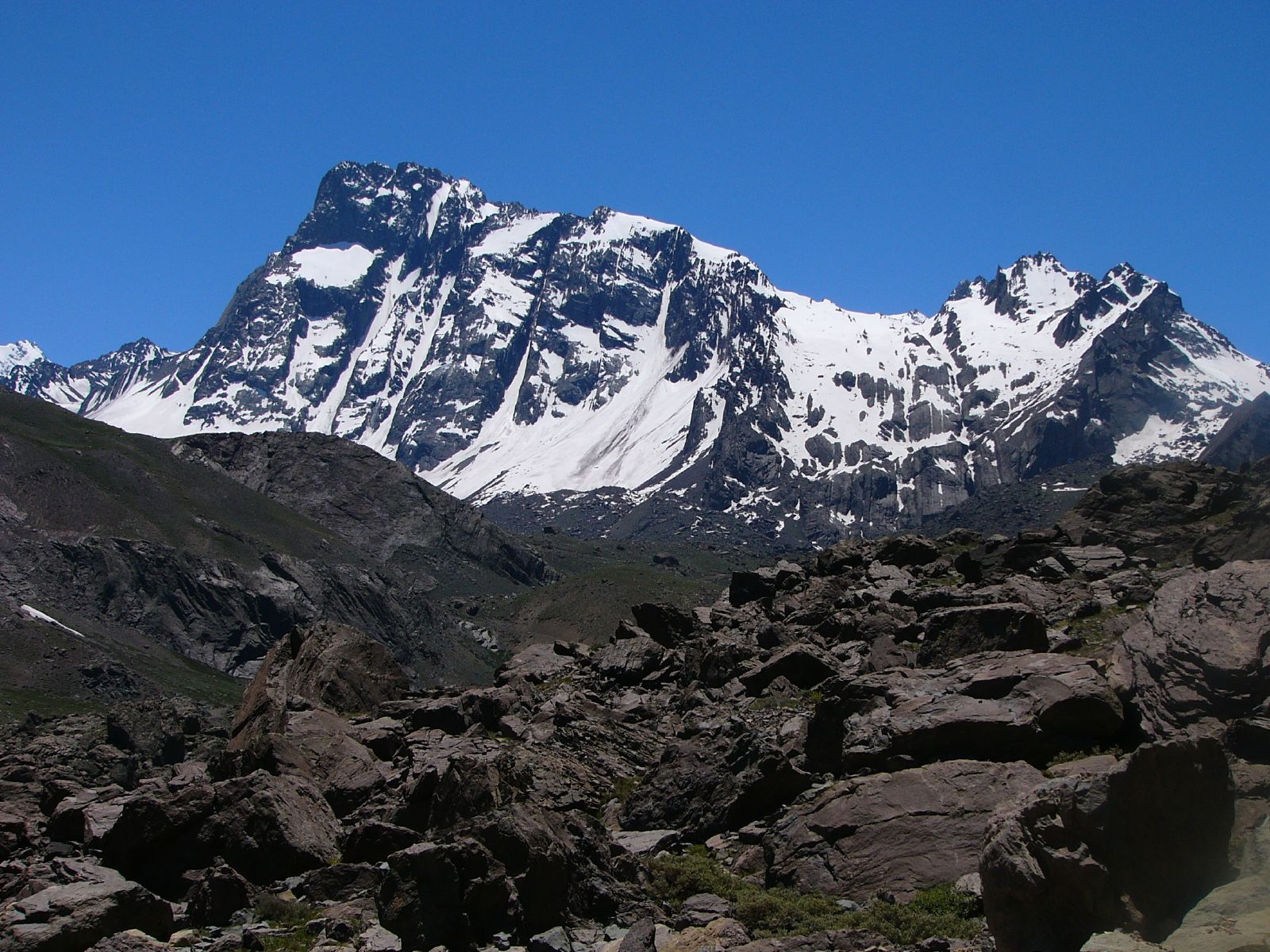
- South Face of Cerro Arenas

Highest point
- Elevation: 4,450 m (14,600 ft)
- Coordinates: 33°45′23″S 70°0′51″W

Geography
- Location: Chile
- Parent range: Principal Cordillera, Andes

Climbing
- First ascent: 1954

Cerro Arenas is a mountain in the Andes of Santiago Metropolitan Region, Chile. It is located west of San José volcano and east of Cerro El Morado. The latter mountain lies on the opposite side of the valley of the Estero Morado, a headwater stream of the Volcán River.
