= Aconcagua Provincial Park =

Provincial park in Mendoza province, Argentina

Coordinates: 32°45′50″S 69°47′45″W

Aconcagua Provincial Park is a Provincial Park located in the Mendoza Province of the Andes Mountains in Argentina, which offers diverse mountaineering activities including hiking, skiing, and climbing. It was created primarily "to conserve the natural and cultural values of the area."

This range plays an important place in the history of Latin America. In 1818, General Don Jose de San Martin crossed these mountains during war with the Spanish Empire, eventually securing independence for Chile by his daring raid.

The summit of the mountain Aconcagua, the tallest mountain in the Americas, was first summited on January 14, 1897, by Matthias Zurbriggen, a member of the FitzGerald expedition. It remains both popular with mountain climbers, but is also dangerous due to altitude sickness; a 33-year-old French mountaineer died suddenly in 2026. Three out of every thousand climbers at Aconcagua Provincial Park die in the attempt to summit the high peak, most often due to trauma, and one fifth of those from high-altitude pulmonary edema.

Some of the more visited attractions that draw tourists all year long are Horcones Lagoon (Laguna de Horcones), and Plaza de Mulas or Plaza Francia.

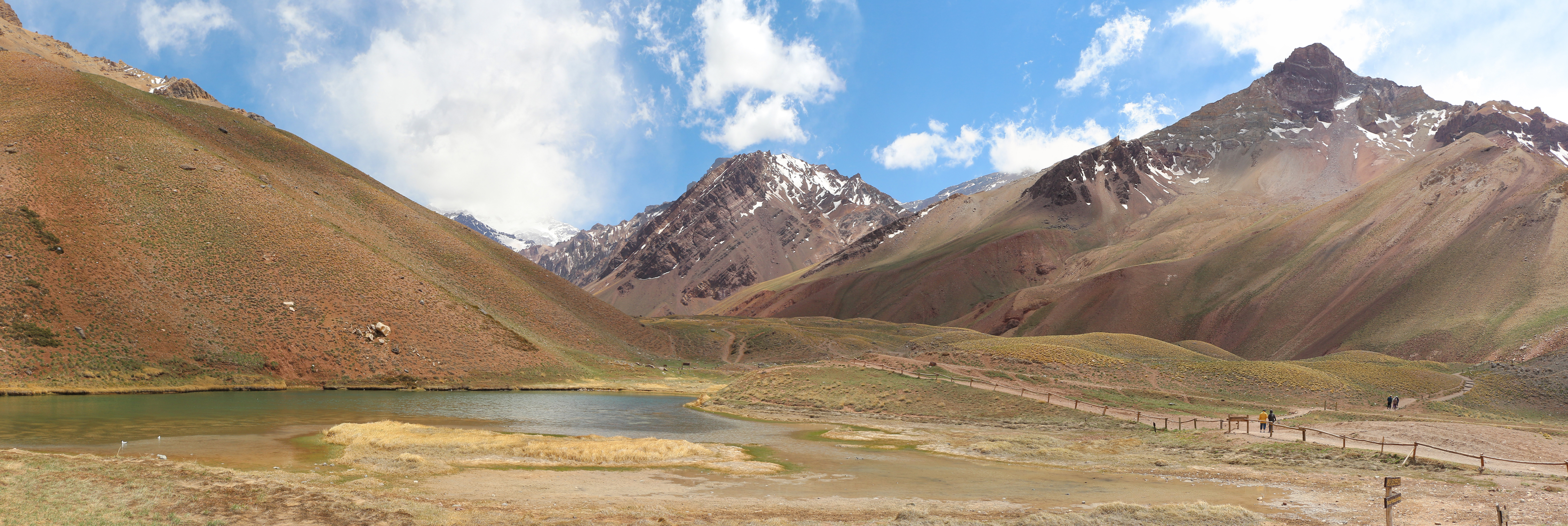
Aconcagua Provincial Park

== See also ==
- Tourism in Argentina
