= Mount Tarn =

Mountain in Chile

Monte Tarn
- Cerro Tarn
- Snowy ascent

Highest point
- Elevation: 825 m (2,707 ft)
- Coordinates: 53°47′07″S 71°01′25″W

Geography
- Location within Chile
- Location: 70 km south of Punta Arenas, Chile
- Parent range: Andes

Climbing
- First ascent: February 1827 by John Tarn

Mount Tarn is a small mountain located on the southernmost part of the Strait of Magellan, in Brunswick Peninsula, about 70 km south of Punta Arenas, Chile. It is in the southern extreme of continental Chile very close to Cape Froward, surrounded by historic places such as Fort Bulnes and Puerto del Hambre (Port Famine).

From the summit it is possible to see the Strait of Magellan, Dawson and Tierra del Fuego islands, and many other smaller ones; the Darwin Mountain Range, Mount Sarmiento, and most of the Brunswick Peninsula.

== Toponymy ==
According to historian Mateo Martinic Beros in his book Cartografía Magallánica 1523-1945, the mount was named after the British surgeon, John Tarn, who first ascended the mountain in February 1827 while traveling with Robert FitzRoy on HMS Adventure and later ascended it while traveling with Phillip Parker King in HMS Beagle), during their surveying voyage from 1826 to 1830.

Tarn participated in a hydrographic survey conducted in the area, through the collection and classification of flora and fauna species.

== Darwin's ascent ==
On 6 February 1834 a group from the second Beagle survey expedition, including Charles Darwin, ascended Mount Tarn by forcing their way up through dense woodland to the bare ridge which took them to the summit. He recounted the story in his Journal and Remarks. In his ascent the young naturalist found the first ammonites ever known in South America.

== See also ==
- Magallanes Province
- Magallanes Region
- Parrillar lagoon
- San Juan river
- San Isidro lighthouse
- Cape Froward.
