= Nevado del Plomo =

Mountain in Argentina

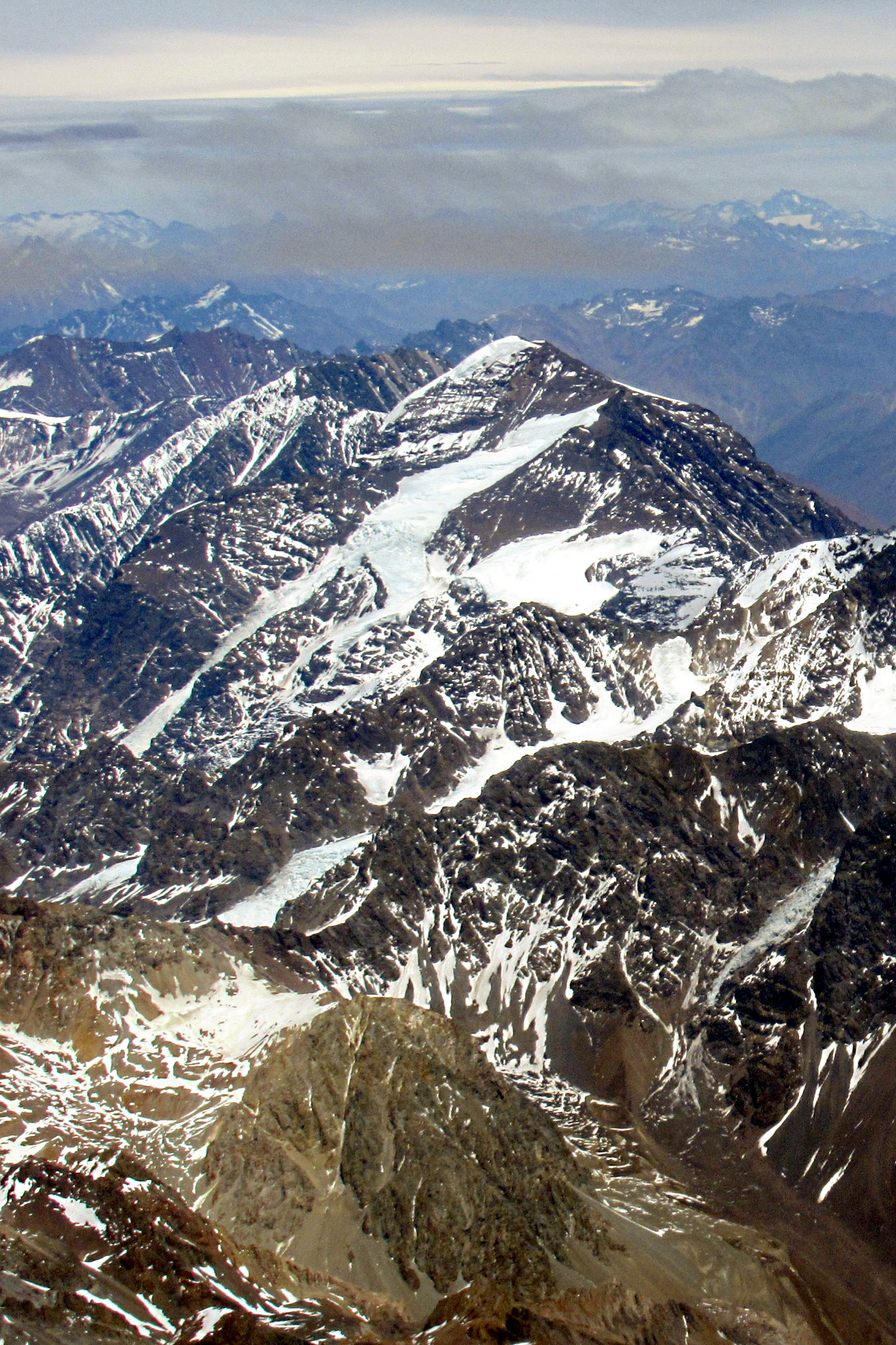
- Northeast side of Nevado del Plomo in Argentina with its glaciers Alfa and Beta.

Highest point
- Elevation: 6,070 m (19,910 ft)
- Prominence: 1,500 m (4,900 ft)
- Parent peak: Tupungato
- Listing: Ultra
- Coordinates: 33°06′12″S 70°03′57″W

Geography
- Location within Argentina
- Location: Chile / Argentina
- Parent range: Principal Cordillera, Andes

Climbing
- First ascent: 20/01/1910 by Frederick Reichert, Friedrich Bade, Robert Helbling (Germany)

Nevado del Plomo, also spelled as Nevado El Plomo, is a mountain on the border between Argentina and Chile. Juncal Sur Glacier, which feeds the Olivares River, descends the west side of the mountain. Nevado del Plomo is part of the Central Andes and has an elevation of 6,070 metres (19,915 ft) metres. The Argentine portion is within the protection area of Tupungato Volcano Provincial Park. It is on the border of two provinces: the Argentinean province of Mendoza and the Chilean province of Cordillera, and its slopes are within the administrative boundaries of two cities, the Argentinean city of Luján de Cuyo, and the Chilean commune of San José de Maipo.

== Elevation ==
It has an official height of 6070 meters. Other data from available digital elevation models: SRTM 6062 metres, ASTER 6037 metres, TanDEM-X 5303 metres. The height of the nearest key col is 4833 meters, leading to a topographic prominence of 1500 meters. Nevado del Plomo is considered a Mountain Subrange according to the Dominance System and its dominance is 20.38%. Its parent peak is Tupungato and the Topographic isolation is 39.5 kilometers.

== First ascent ==
Nevado del Plomo was first climbed by Friedrich Reichert, Friedrich Bade, and Robert Helbling (Germany) in 01/20/1910.
