= Principal Cordillera =

Section of the Andes on the Argentina–Chile border

Coordinates: 32°S 70°W

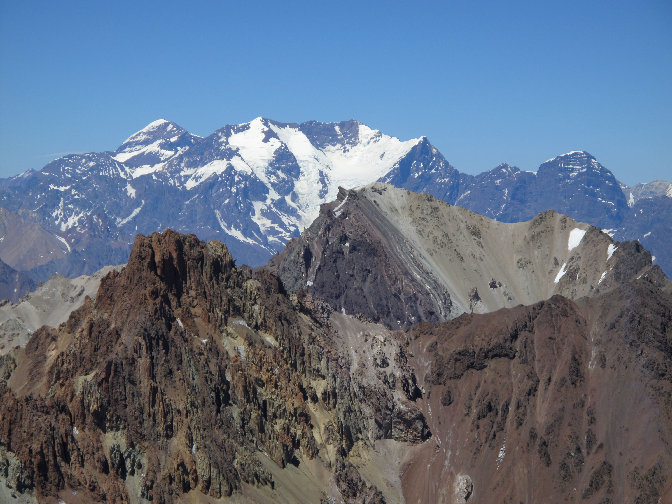
Nevado del Plomo (left) and Nevado Juncal (behind) are two mountains of the Principal Cordillera along the Argentina-Chile border and the Atlantic-Pacific watershed.

Principal Cordillera (Spanish: Cordillera Principal) is the Andean mountain range that makes up the boundary between Central Chile and neighbouring areas of Argentina. It is also a continental divide between the Atlantic and the Pacific watersheds. It extends in a north–south direction in the Argentine provinces of La Rioja, San Juan and Mendoza and the Chilean regions of Valparaíso, Santiago, O'Higgins and Maule. To the east of the Principal Cordillera lies the Frontal Cordillera which is fully in Argentina. Aconcagua, the tallest mountain outside Asia, lies in the Principal Cordillera.

== Geological history ==
What is today the Principal Cordillera was once a depression that accumulated sediments. Lava flows from ancient volcanoes also found their way to the depression. Today these sequences of sedimentary and volcanic rock can be observed high in the Andes, implying their basin was closed and uplifted by tectonic inversion. The said rocks are grouped in the Abanico and Farellones Formation. Tectonic inversion took place 21 to 16 million years (Ma) ago, yet the associated pulse of uplift continued until about 8 Ma ago. The Miocene continental divide was about 20 km to the west of the modern water divide that makes up the Argentina–Chile border. Subsequent river incision shifted the divide to the east leaving old flattish surfaces hanging. Compression and uplift in this part of the Andes has continued into the present. The Principal Cordillera had risen to heights that allowed for the development of valley glaciers about 1 Ma ago.
