= Maximo Kausch =

Argentine mountaineer

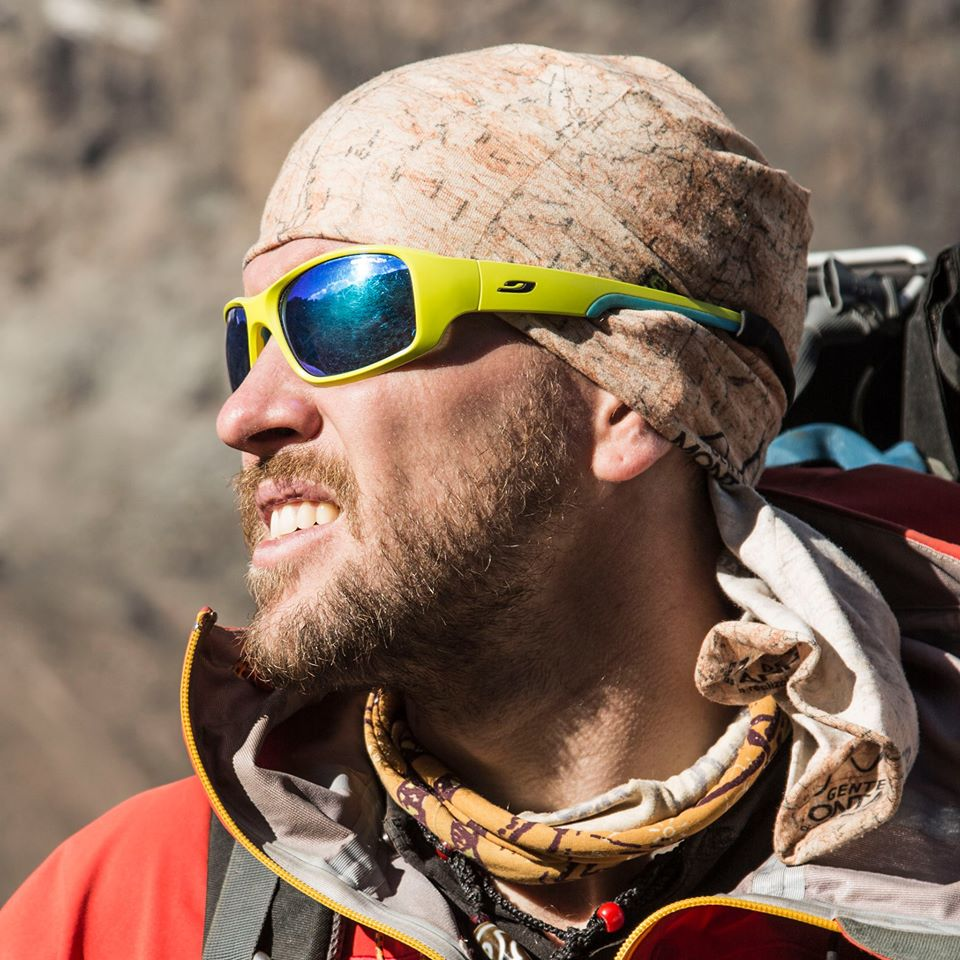
Maximo Kausch

Maximo Kausch (born March 1981 in Argentina) is a British mountain guide and expedition leader. He holds the current world record of the most 6,000-metre Andean peaks climbed.

His project, "Andes' All 6000m Peaks" aims to climb all 104 of the 6,000-metre peaks in the Andes. He maps all peaks using GPS units and publishes all his work for free in the hope that more climbers might attempt the project. The whole project has not been tried before by other mountaineers.

== Awards ==
He is the world-record holder with the most 6000 metre Andean peaks and so far (Jan 2017) reached the summit of 83 6000 mountains (not counting secondary peaks).

== Projects ==
- Andes 6000+: 83 peaks climbed by the date (Jan 2017) and 11 secondary 6000m peaks in the Andes alone. His total number of high altitude climbed mountains is unknown and is probably near to 180. The project started in 2012.
- 30 x 6000ers in 2 months: Maximo climbed 30 peaks in 60 days in late 2012. This great achievement was done alone and approaching the mountains on a 250cc motorbike. He covered 7000 km from the Atacama all the way to the Central Andes.
- Bolivia’s all 6000ers: Maximo has concluded (15 peaks) the project in August 2014
- Chile's all 6000ers: Concluded all 39 peaks in December 2017
- Argentina's all 6000ers: Concluded all 43 peaks in December 2017
- Andes unclimbed 5000ers: He has successfully climbed 5 unclimbed 5000m peaks in the Andes including the highest of them all, Mt Parofes 5845m
