= Suzanne Imber =

Planetary scientist

Suzie Imber
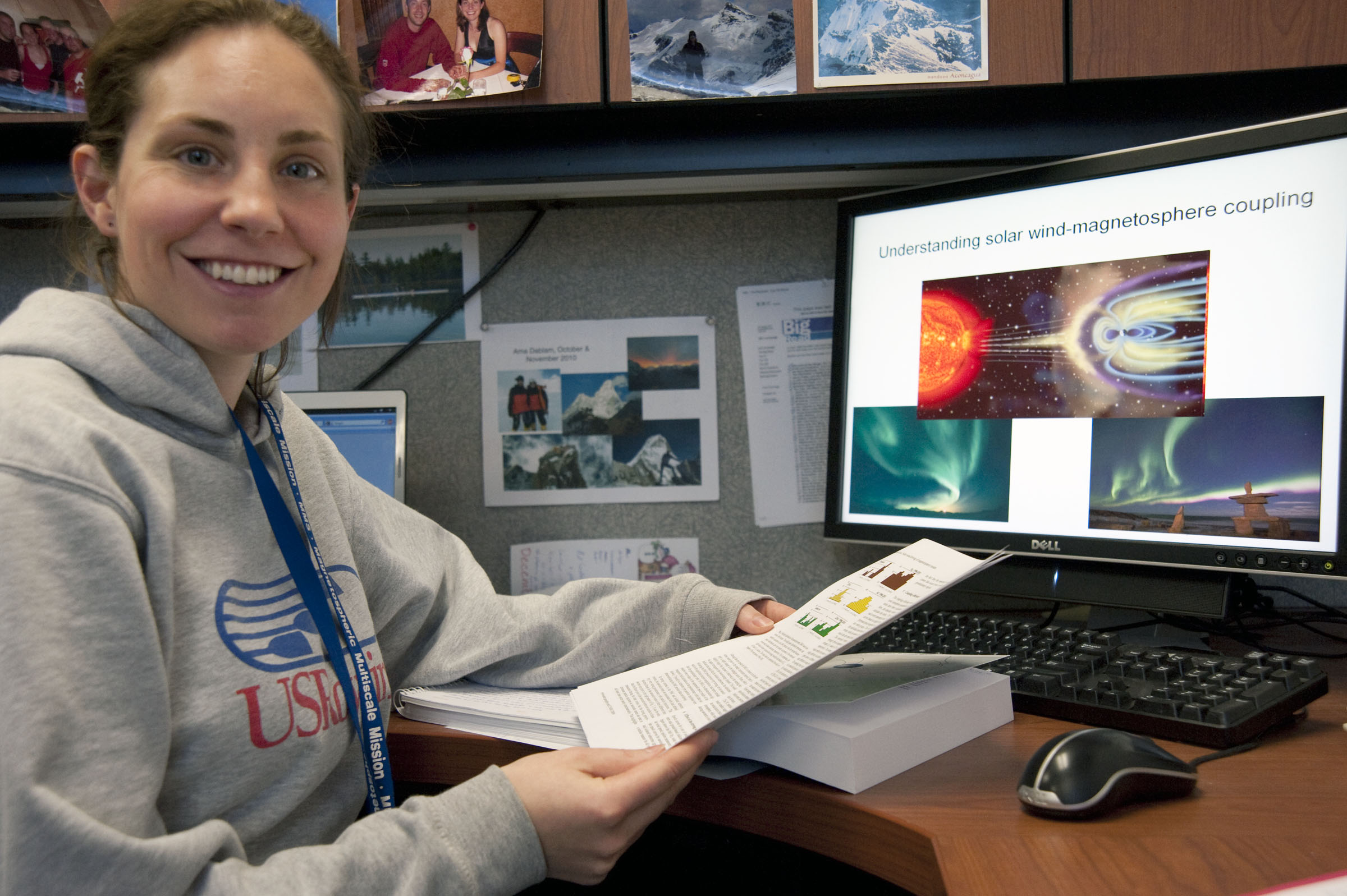
- Imber at her desk at Goddard Space Flight Center in 2011
- Born: Suzanne Mary Imber; May 1983 (age 43); Aylesbury, United Kingdom
- Education: Berkhamsted School
- Alma mater: Imperial College London (MSc); University of Leicester (PhD)
- Known for: Planetary science
- Awards: Rosalind Franklin Award (2021)
- Scientific career
- Fields: Physics
- Institutions: University of Leicester; Goddard Space Flight Center
- Thesis: Auroral and Ionospheric Flow Measurements of Magnetopause Reconnection During Intervals of Northward Interplanetary Magnetic Field (2008)
- Doctoral advisor: Steve Milan; Mark Lester
- Website: www.suzieimber.co.uk

Suzanne Mary Imber (born May 1983) is a British planetary scientist specialising in space weather at the University of Leicester's School of Physics and Astronomy. She was the winner of the 2017 BBC Two television programme Astronauts, Do You Have What It Takes?.

== Education ==
Imber was born in Aylesbury, Buckinghamshire and attended Berkhamsted School in Hertfordshire. One highlight of her school years was winning the Lacrosse National Championships in 2000. She studied a 4-year physics degree at Imperial College London, from where she graduated with a first class honours in 2005. She captained the University of London Lacrosse team and went on to play for the England under-21s. She undertook two internships at NASA during her time at Imperial, working in the Heliophysics Division at NASA Goddard Space Flight Center, which steered her in the direction of planetary science. She completed her PhD thesis in 2008 on the Auroral and Ionospheric Flow Measurements of Magnetopause Reconnection during Intervals of Northward Interplanetary Magnetic Field, at the University of Leicester.

== Research and public engagement ==
Imber joined the Goddard Space Flight Center in Maryland in 2008 as a NASA research scientist. Here she studied 'space weather', contributing to the understanding of how energy and momentum from the solar wind influence the environments of the Earth and Mercury, using data from NASA and ESA spacecraft combined with ground-based observations. Her supervisor and mentor was Professor Jim Slavin, who was involved with the MESSENGER mission to Mercury.

In 2011 she returned to the University of Leicester as a postdoctoral research associate. In 2014 she was awarded a Leverhulme Trust Fellowship, "Rough Winds do Shake the Magnetosphere of Mercury". Imber is a visiting professor at the University of Michigan, as well as the only UK member of NASA's MESSENGER Science Team, in recognition of her work studying Mercury's magnetosphere. She is a co-investigator on the Mercury Imaging X-ray Spectrometer (MIXS), an instrument designed and built at the University of Leicester, currently on board the European Space Agency's Mercury mission, BepiColombo, which launched on 19 October 2018. This instrument is designed to determine the composition of the surface of Mercury in unprecedented detail, aimed at resolving key questions about Mercury's formation and evolution, and will also measure Mercury's X-ray aurora, a phenomenon recently discovered by Imber's research team studying the magnetosphere of Mercury.

In 2017 Imber was selected for the BBC Two's Astronauts, Do You Have What It Takes?. She endured several challenges, including speaking Russian in a centrifuge after enduring 4.5g, taking part in emergency procedures in an undersea training facility and taking her own blood. She won the competition and received a recommendation from Chris Hadfield to join the European Space Agency. Since winning, Imber has launched a public engagement programme in her spare time, personally speaking with over 35,000 school children at hundreds of schools across the country, and giving over 60 public lectures in the course of 12 months. Her goal is to raise the aspirations of young people and share her journey and her enthusiasm for her career as a space scientist.

=== Awards and honours ===
In 2019, Imber gave the Claudia Parsons Memorial Lecture at Loughborough University. In the same year, she was elected to the new post of Pro Chancellor (Students) by Leicester Students' University.

She was awarded the Rosalind Franklin Award by the Royal Society in 2021 for her "achievements in the field of planetary science and her well-considered project proposal with a potential for a high impact".

She was the winner of the 2017 BBC Two television programme Astronauts, Do You Have What It Takes?.

== Personal life ==
Imber is a high-altitude mountaineer who has climbed peaks in Alaska, the Himalayas, and the Andes, working since 2014 with Argentinian explorer Maximo Kausch.
