= TanDEM-X =

German Earth observation satellite mission

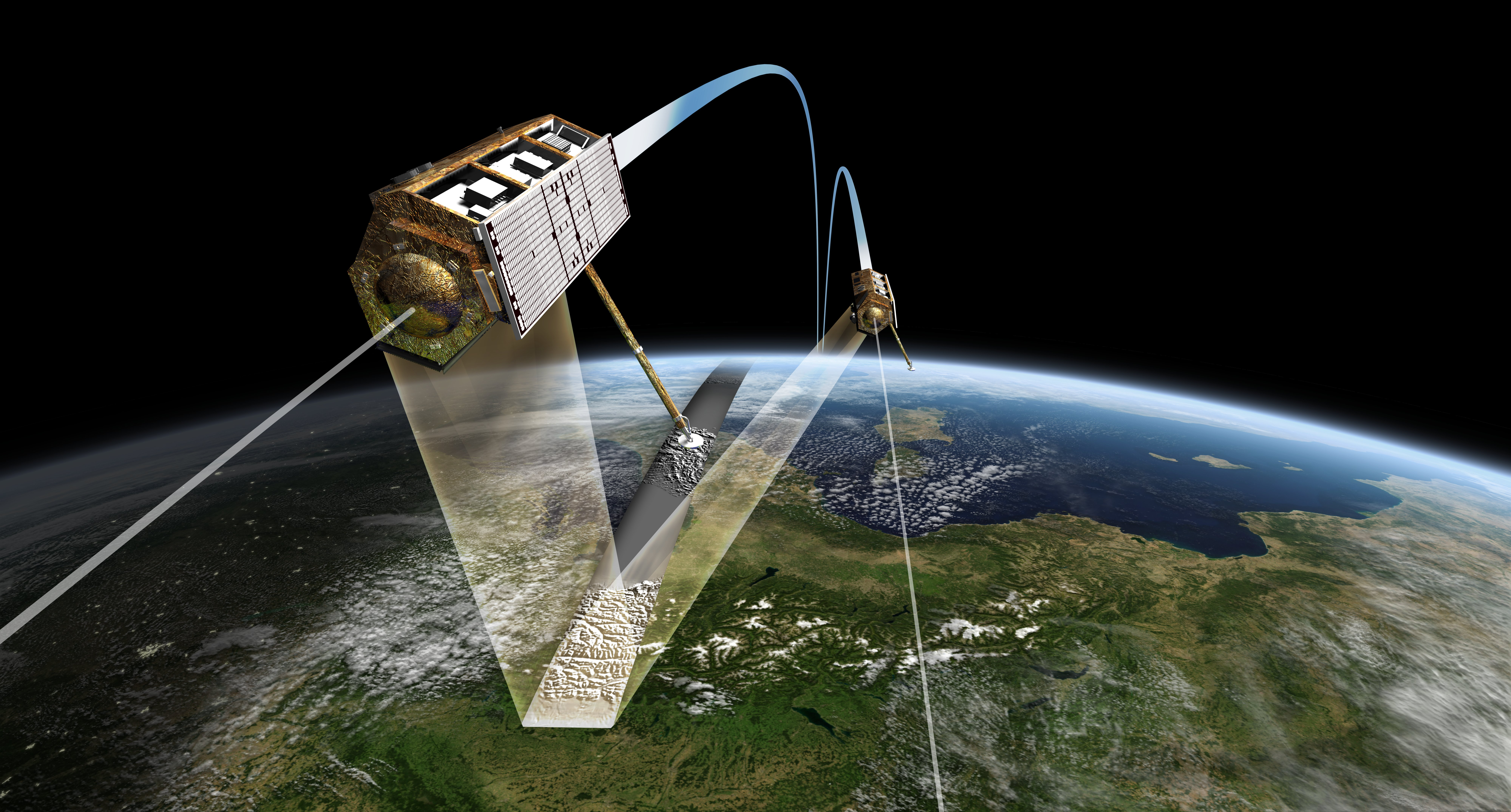
- TanDEM-X
- Mission type: Radar Imaging
- Operator: DLR
- COSPAR ID: 2010-030A
- SATCAT no.: 36605
- Website: Home
- Mission duration: Elapsed: 15 years, 6 months and 4 days

Spacecraft properties
- Manufacturer: EADS Astrium Satellites

Start of mission
- Launch date: 21 June 2010, 02:14:00 UTC
- Rocket: Dnepr
- Launch site: Baikonur 109/95

Orbital parameters
- Reference system: Geocentric
- Regime: Low Earth

TanDEM-X (TerraSAR-X add-on for Digital Elevation Measurement) is a German twin satellite mission using interferometric synthetic aperture radar (InSAR). It is developed in a public-private partnership between the German Aerospace centre (DLR) and EADS Astrium (now Airbus Defence and Space). It consists of the original TerraSAR-X satellite (TSX) and an identical spacecraft (TDX) in formation flying, with typical distances between 250 and 500 m. The two satellite constellation allowed the generation of the WorldDEM global digital elevation models starting in 2014.

== WorldDEM ==
The primary mission objective is the generation of WorldDEM, a consistent global Digital Elevation Model (DEM) with an unprecedented accuracy better than DTED Level 2 specifications. WorldDEM resolution will correspond to DTED Level 3 (post spacing of better than 12 meters) and a height accuracy of better than 2m (relative)- a standard not yet defined. Digital Elevation Models of posting better than DTED Level 2 are often called HRTI (High Resolution Terrain Information) DEM.

WorldDEM is a highly accurate, detailed and consistent DEM of the Earth's entire land surface, acquired and generated within three years after launch. Available from 2014, WorldDEM is to feature a vertical accuracy of 2m (relative) and 4m (absolute), within a horizontal raster of approximately 12x12 square meters, slightly varying depending on the geographic latitude. Infoterra GmbH, a 100% subsidiary of Astrium, holds the exclusive commercial marketing rights for the WorldDEM and is responsible for the adaptation of the elevation model to the needs of commercial users worldwide. When the system launched, accuracy over forested areas was unknown.

Researchers at the German Aerospace Center facility in Oberpfaffenhofen published the first 3D images generated from the TanDEM-X satellite mission. A group of Russian islands of the Severnaya Zemlya group in the Arctic Ocean was selected for the first test.

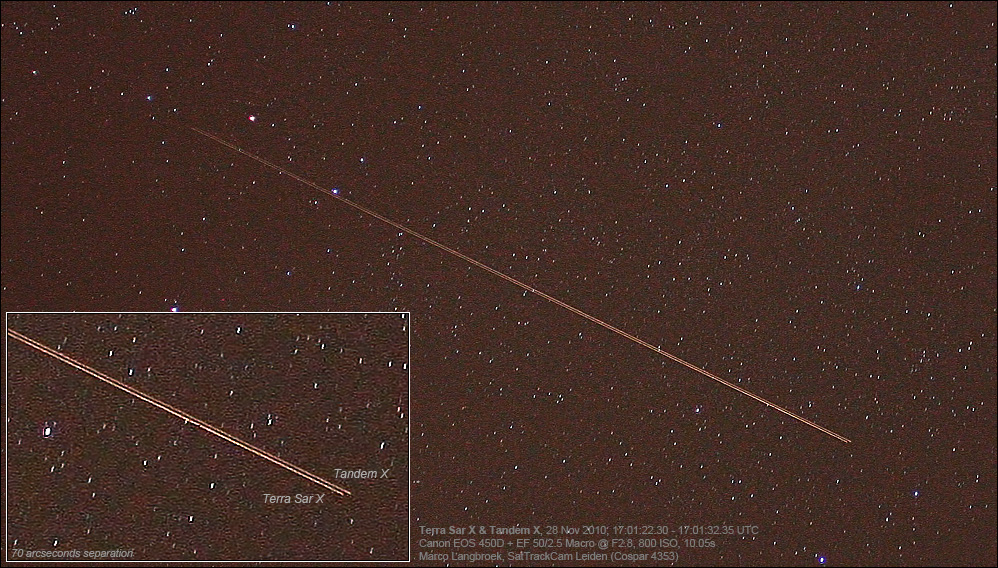
The radar remote sensing satellites TanDEM X and Terra SAR X photographed while flying in close formation (photo by Marco Langbroek, Leiden, the Netherlands). Movement is from lower right to upper left in this 10 second exposure.

=== Derived products ===
HydroSHEDS v2 is a hydrologically pre-conditioned version of WorldDEM at 1-arcsecond (30 m) resolution. It was supposed to be released in 2024 but was repeatedly delayed. It was still being worked on as of December 2025.
