= Advanced Spaceborne Thermal Emission and Reflection Radiometer =

Japanese imaging device aboard NASA's Terra satellite

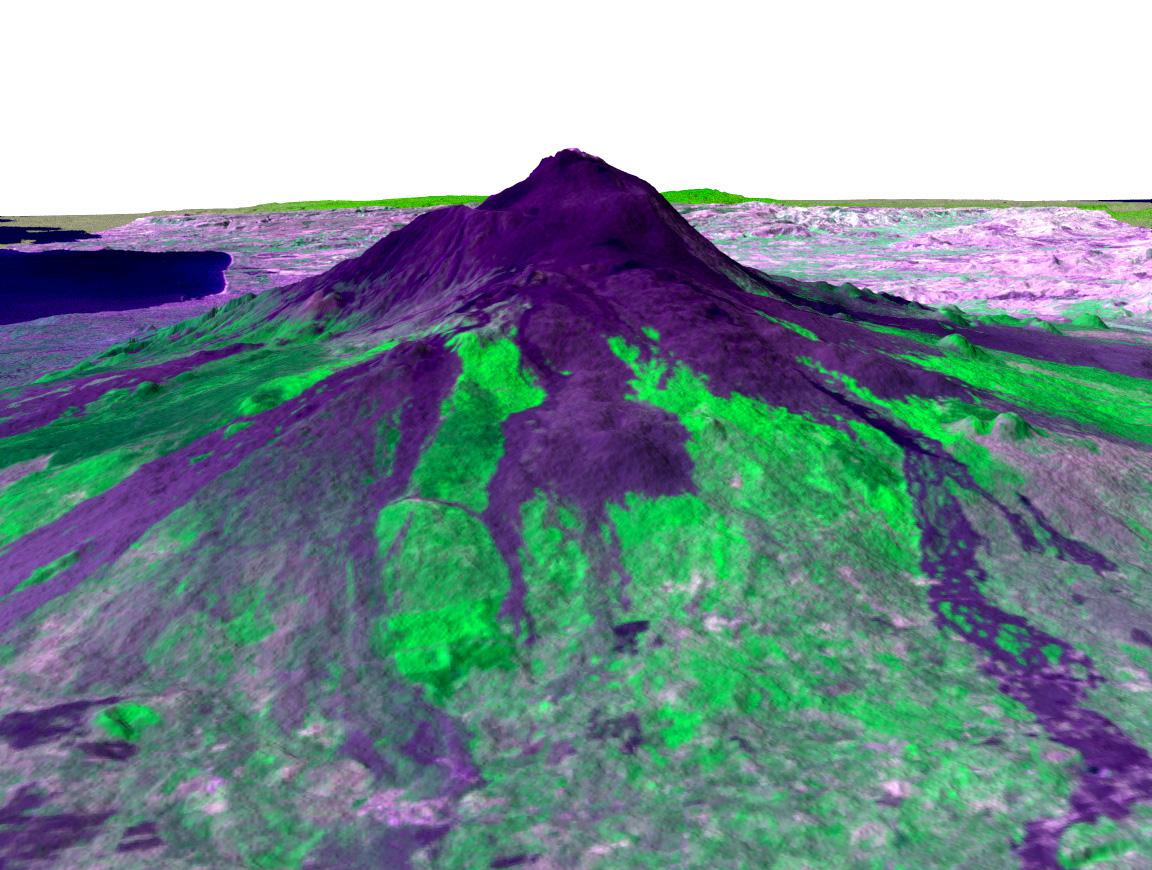
ASTER image draped over terrain model of Mount Etna

The Advanced Spaceborne Thermal Emission and Reflection Radiometer (ASTER) is a Japanese remote sensing instrument onboard the Terra satellite launched by NASA in 1999. It has been collecting data since February 2000.

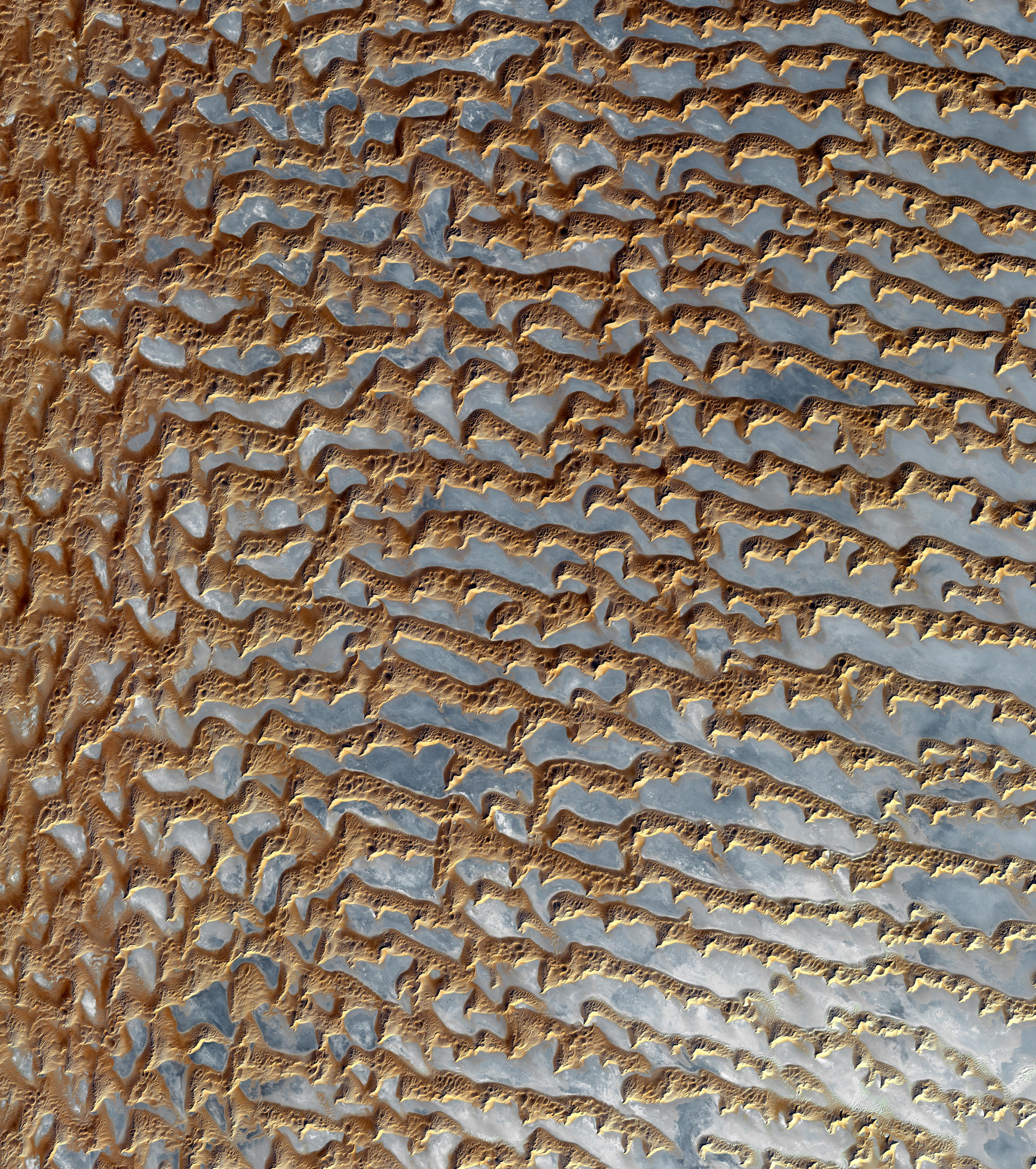
ASTER image of Rub' al Khali (Arabia's Empty Quarter)

ASTER provides high-resolution images of Earth in 14 different bands of the electromagnetic spectrum, ranging from visible to thermal infrared light. The resolution of images ranges between 15 and 90 meters. ASTER data is used to create detailed maps of surface temperature of land, emissivity, reflectance, and elevation.

In April 2008, the SWIR detectors of ASTER began malfunctioning and were publicly declared non-operational by NASA in January 2009. All SWIR data collected after 1 April 2008 has been marked as unusable.

The ASTER Global Digital Elevation Model (GDEM) is available at no charge to users worldwide via electronic download.

As of 2 April 2016, the entire catalogue of ASTER image data became publicly available online at no cost. It can be downloaded with a free registered account from either NASA's Earth Data Search delivery system or from the USGS Earth Explorer delivery system.

== ASTER bands ==
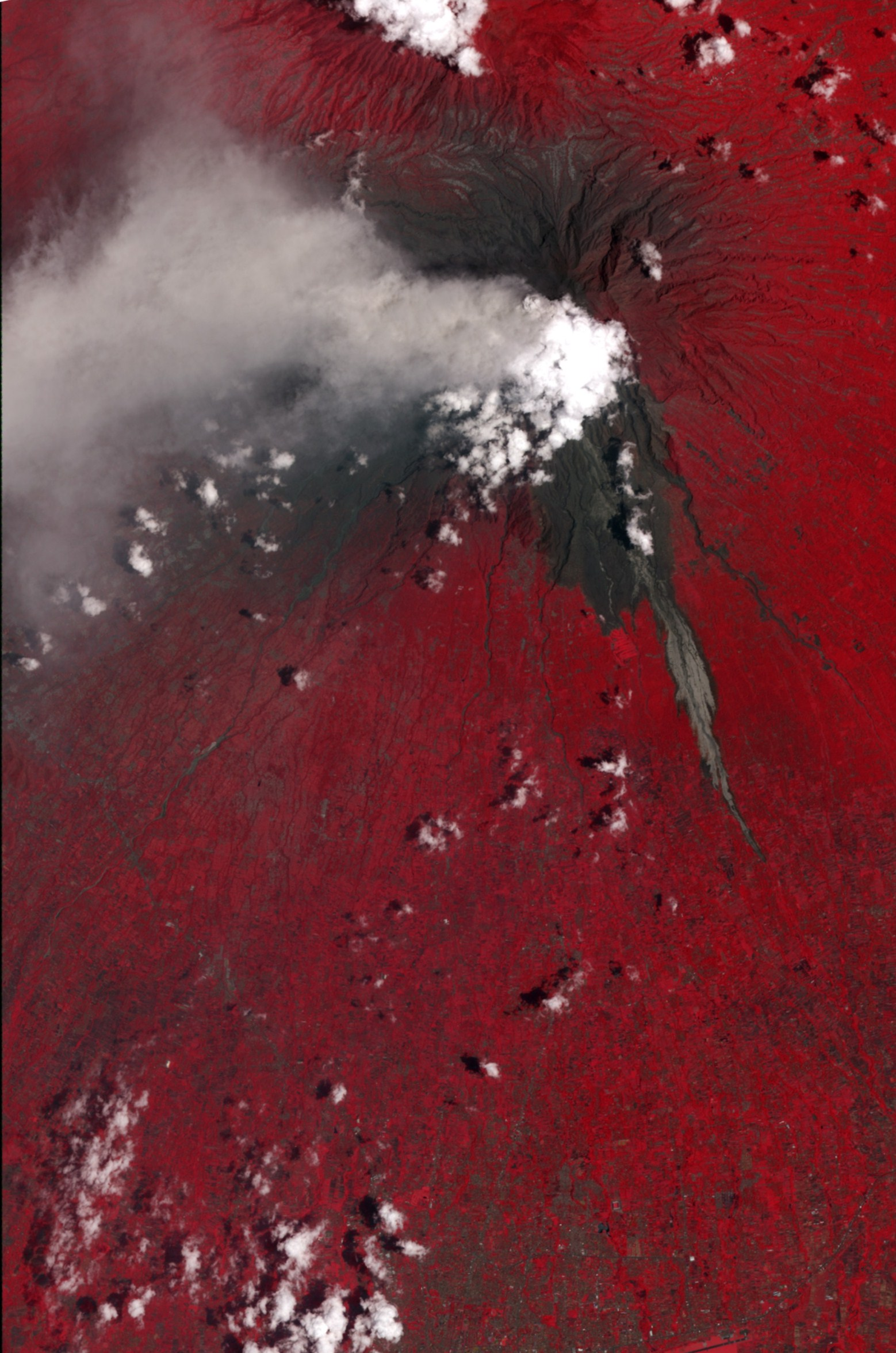
ASTER false-colour satellite image of 2010 eruption of Mount Merapi, showing evidence of a large pyroclastic flow along the Gendol River south of Mount Merapi

Band	Label	Wavelength (μm)	Resolution (m)	Nadir or backward	Description
B1	VNIR_Band1	0.520 - 0.60	15	Nadir	Visible green/yellow
B2	VNIR_Band2	0.630 - 0.690	15	Nadir	Visible red
B3N	VNIR_Band3N	0.760–0.860	15	Nadir	Near infrared
B3B	VNIR_Band3B	0.760–0.860	15	Backward	Near infrared
B4	SWIR_Band4	1.600–1.700	30	Nadir	Short-wave infrared
B5	SWIR_Band5	2.145–2.185	30	Nadir	Short-wave infrared
B6	SWIR_Band6	2.185–2.225	30	Nadir	Short-wave infrared
B7	SWIR_Band7	2.235–2.285	30	Nadir	Short-wave infrared
B8	SWIR_Band8	2.295–2.365	30	Nadir	Short-wave infrared
B9	SWIR_Band9	2.360–2.430	30	Nadir	Short-wave infrared
B10	TIR_Band10	8.125–8.475	90	Nadir	Long-wave infrared or thermal IR
B11	TIR_Band11	8.475–8.825	90	Nadir	Long-wave infrared or thermal IR
B12	TIR_Band12	8.925–9.275	90	Nadir	Long-wave infrared or thermal IR
B13	TIR_Band13	10.250–10.950	90	Nadir	Long-wave infrared or thermal IR
B14	TIR_Band14	10.950–11.650	90	Nadir	Long-wave infrared or thermal IR

== ASTER Global Digital Elevation Model ==
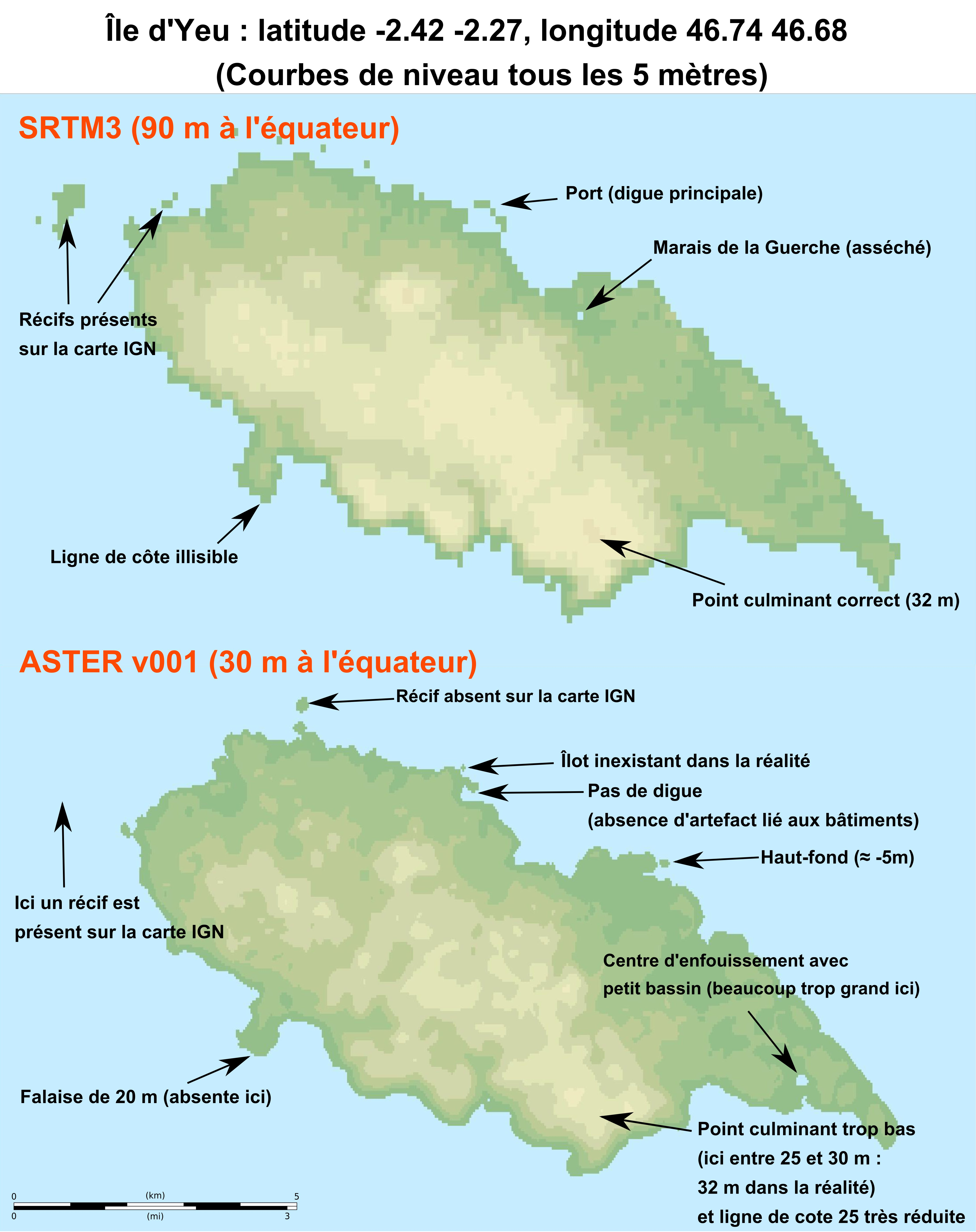
SRTM3 vs. ASTER1 comparison (Île d'Yeu), inaccuracies and errors of the latter are indicated by arrows

=== Version 1 ===
On 29 June 2009, the Global Digital Elevation Model (GDEM) was released to the public. A joint operation between NASA and Japan's Ministry of Economy, Trade and Industry (METI), the Global Digital Elevation Model is the most complete mapping of the earth ever made, covering 99% of its surface. The previous most comprehensive map, NASA's Shuttle Radar Topography Mission, covered approximately 80% of the Earth's surface, with a global resolution of 90 meters, and a resolution of 30 meters over the US. The GDEM covers the planet from 83 degrees North to 83 degrees South (surpassing SRTM's coverage of 56 °S to 60 °N), becoming the first earth mapping system that provides comprehensive coverage of the polar regions. It was created by compiling 1.3 million VNIR images taken by ASTER using single-pass stereoscopic correlation techniques, with terrain elevation measurements taken globally at 30-meter (98 ft) intervals.

Despite the high nominal resolution, however, some reviewers have commented that the true resolution is considerably lower, and not as good as that of SRTM data, and serious artifacts are present.

Some of these limitations have been confirmed by METI and NASA, who point out that the version 1 of the GDEM product is "research grade".

=== Version 2 ===
STL 3D model of Penang Island terrain based on ASTER Global DEMv2 data

During October 2011, version 2 of Global Digital Elevation Model was publicly released. This is considered an improvement upon version 1. These improvements include increased horizontal and vertical accuracy, better horizontal resolution, reduced presence of artifacts, and more realistic values over water bodies. However, one reviewer still regards the Aster version 2 dataset, although showing 'a considerable improvement in the effective level of detail', to still be regarded as 'experimental or research grade' due to presence of artefacts. A 2014 study showed that over rugged mountainous terrain the ASTER version 2 data set can be a more accurate representation of the ground than the SRTM elevation model. The model was decommissioned as of August 5 2025.

=== Version 3 ===
ASTER v3 was released on 5 August 2019.

The improved GDEM V3 adds additional stereo-pairs, improving coverage and reducing the occurrence of artifacts. The refined production algorithm provides improved spatial resolution, increased horizontal and vertical accuracy. The ASTER GDEM V3 maintains the GeoTIFF format and the same gridding and tile structure as V1 and V2, with 30-meter postings and 1 x 1 degree tiles. Version 3 is claimed to have significant improvements over the previous release. Automated processing of 2.3 million scenes from the ASTER archive was used to create the ASTER GDEM, which included stereo-correlation to create individual scene-based ASTER DEMs, masking to remove cloudy pixels, stacking all cloud-screened DEMs, removing residual bad values and outliers, averaging selected data to create final pixel values.

- Ground sample distance
- Shuttle Radar Topography Mission (SRTM)
