= Chirano Gold Mine =

Gold mine in Western, Ghana

Chirano
- Location of Chirano

Location
- Location: Bibiani/Anhwiaso/Bekwai District, Western Region, Ghana; 6°18′37″N 2°22′59″W

Production
- Production: 263,911 oz gold equiv.
- Financial year: 2012

History
- Opened: 2005

Owner
- Company: Asante Gold Chirano Limited 90%, Government of Ghana 10% carried
- Acquired: 2010

Chirano Gold Mine (currently Asante Gold Chirano Ltd) is an underground and open pit gold mine in the Western North Region of Ghana, within the Bibiani gold belt. It is 90% owned by Vancouver based Asante Gold Corporation. The Government of Ghana has a 10% carried interest.

== Description ==
The Chirano Gold Mine is located in southwestern Ghana, approximately 100 kilometres southwest of Kumasi, Ghana's second-largest city.

Chirano was explored and developed from 1996 by Red Back Mining NL, an Australian company that moved to a Canadian listing in April 2004. Chirano began production in October 2005. Kinross Gold acquired the mine on 17 September 2010 through a US$7.1 billion takeover of Red Back Mining, through which it also acquired the Tasiast Gold Mine in Mauritania.

Asante Gold Corporation acquired the company in a US$250 million takeover in 2022 from Kinross Gold Corporation.

The mine has five underground operations: Akwaaba, Suraw, Paboase, Tano, and Obra, and two surface operations; Mamnao and Akoti South

Open pit and underground ore are processed at the Chirano plant. The capacity of the mill is approximately 3.5 million tonnes per annum. Processing involves crushing, ball mill grinding, cyanide leaching and carbon-in-leach (CIL) extraction.

At 31 December 2012, Chirano's Proven and Probable Reserves were 20.271 million tonnes at 2.65 g/t gold for 1.722 million ounces, with an additional 0.44 million ounces of Measured and Indicated Resource.

2012 gold equivalent production was 263,911 ounces at a cost of sale of US$721/oz. 2012 recoveries averaged 93%.

== See also ==
- Geology of Ghana
- Birimian
