= Jotabeche =

Miocene-Pliocene caldera in the Atacama Region of Chile

Jotabeche is a Miocene-Pliocene caldera in the Atacama Region of Chile. It is part of the volcanic Andes, more specifically of the extreme southern end of the Central Volcanic Zone (CVZ). This sector of the Andean Volcanic Belt contains about 44 volcanic centres and numerous more minor volcanic systems, as well as some caldera and ignimbrite systems. Jotabeche is located in a now inactive segment of the CVZ, the Maricunga Belt.

Jotabeche formed from the subduction of the Nazca Plate beneath the South American Plate, like the other volcanoes in the CVZ and the Andean Volcanic Belt. In the region of Jotabeche, during the late Miocene and Pliocene a change in the subduction geometry has caused volcanism to end, with volcanism shifting eastwards to the Incapillo volcanic centre. The crust beneath Jotabeche is 70 kilometres (43 mi) thick, which has had effects on the rock composition of the volcano.

Jotabeche has erupted two major ignimbrites between 8,500,000 and 5,900,000 years ago. The first ignimbrite was the larger one and is named Negro Francisco and the second is called Jotabeche proper. A caldera and some lava domes are also part of the complex. Volcanism ceased 5 million years ago.

== Geography and structure ==
Jotabeche is located at the extreme southern end of the Central Volcanic Zone (CVZ) of the Andes. The Central Volcanic Zone is one of the four volcanic zones of the Andean Volcanic Belt. In this belt, ongoing subduction of the Antarctic Plate, Nazca Plate and its precursor the Farallon Plate are responsible for ongoing volcanic activity, including such volcanoes as Villarrica and Nevado del Ruiz. The Central Volcanic Zone sub-belt itself contains about 44 volcanic centres and over five major Quaternary caldera and ignimbrite complexes. The so-called Abancay deflection separates the CVZ in the north from the Peruvian flat subduction segment where no volcanic activity occurs, while the southern limit is marked by a seismic discontinuity around 27° S.

Jotabeche is a 5,862 metres (19,232 ft) high volcano with a caldera. A rhyolitic dome formed inside of the caldera. The Jotabeche complex reaches a thickness of 500 metres (1,600 ft) when including ignimbrite, lava domes and lavas. The 5,432 metres (17,822 ft) high and 4 kilometres (2.5 mi) wide Jotabeche Norte stratovolcano is found northeast of Jotabeche and is surrounded by pyroclastic flows. The Santa Cecilia lava domes (27°41′S 69°19.5′W) have diameters of 1.5 kilometres (0.93 mi) and sit along a 4 kilometres (2.5 mi) long fault. The Miocene volcanic complex branches out in four chains stretching in east–west direction, the Cadillal, Aguas Blancas, Jotabeche Norte and Cordon de Yeguas Heladas. N-S to NE-SW trending faults border the volcanic complex and have allowed the intrusion of diorite porphyries. The resulting hydrothermally altered rocks are the sites of mineral deposits and prospects. These faults include the Yeguas Heladas, Rio La Gallina and Rio Astaburuaga and form a hexagonal structure which partly forms the margin of the caldera. Otherwise, only little erosion has taken place at Jotabeche; stronger erosion though has exposed a >1 kilometre (0.62 mi) thick hydrothermally altered complex at Aldebaran-Cerro Casale. Other hydrothermally altered areas are found within depressions. The crust beneath Jotabeche reaches a thickness of 60 kilometres (37 mi).

== Geology ==
Jotabeche is a volcanic centre in the 26-6 mya old and 200 kilometres (120 mi) long Maricunga belt. Some stratovolcanoes in the belt include Copiapó-Azufre, Cerros Bravos, Doña Inés, La Laguna, Lagunillas, Ojos del Maricunga, Santa Rosa and Cadillal-Yeguas Heladas. Volcanic activity in this belt has also generated porphyry deposits containing silver, gold and copper. This belt is bordered by graben and horst tectonic structures that have generated the Salar de Maricunga and the Laguna del Negro Francisco.

Jotabeche is located at the southern end of the Maricunga belt, which was active starting from the Oligocene until the Pliocene. The formation of this volcanic belt was influenced by the changes in the subduction of the Nazca Plate, which included the shallowing of the subducting plate and the formation of the Puna plateau. Jotabeche, belonging to the fourth stage of Maricunga belt activity after the third stage of Copiapo, is the youngest eruption of the Maricunga belt, whose activity ended with the Jotabeche caldera forming eruption. Volcanism afterwards shifted eastwards. Jotabeche is one of the largest volcanoes in the Maricunga belt. Volcanic activity at Jotabeche is coeval with the last mineralization phase of the Vallecito system in the El Indio belt.

=== Local ===
Jotabeche is part of the so-called Cordillera de Darwin segment of the Andes. The basement in the area consists of various sedimentary-volcanic formations dating back to the Paleozoic Chinches formation but also including the Jurassic Lautaro formation and the Cretaceous Quebrada de Monardes formation. Of the volcanic formations, the Pantanoso rhyolitic formation of the Paleozoic and the thick andesitic-dacitic lava flows of the mesozoic Rio Aguas Blancas formation are the most important. During the Cretaceous, local extension formed a number of small faults in the area. The oldest of these sequences crops out east of Jotabeche at the Chilean-Argentine frontier.

=== Composition ===
Jotabeche has generated rhyodacite rocks. The Negro Francisco ignimbrite is rhyolitic while the Jotabeche ignimbrite itself is of rhyodacitic composition. Specific SiO_{2} concentrations are 65–70% for Negro Francisco while the caldera complex has 68–72%. The Jotabeche Norte stratovolcano has a concentration of 60% and is considered to be hornblende andesite in terms of composition. Overall, all rocks fit the potassium-rich calc alkaline pattern. Gold-rich porphyry deposits are found on Jotabeche's flanks. Diorites are also found but the only weak erosion and thick late Miocene rock cover bury them. Other mineralizations are found between Jotabeche and the Salar de Maricunga.

The chemistry of Jotabeche ignimbrites is distinct from other Tertiary volcanic rocks in the Andes. The rocks of Jotabeche have lanthanum, strontium and yttrium concentrations which fit an eclogitic trend, similar to other Andean volcanoes Pircas Negras, Tortolas and Vallecito. More generally, the geochemistry is indicative of the volcanic activity being influenced both by a thick crust and other factors of crustal contamination. Other composition data are indicative of a drop in mantle water content above the shallowing slab. The crust above the Jotabeche ignimbrite source region was thick enough to permit the stability of garnet in said source region.

== Glaciation ==
Jotabeche does not currently display any perennial snow, only during summer is snow observed in the area. Likewise, rock glaciers are only found as fossil remnants. However, moraines are found at Jotabeche, and glaciers advanced north from a cirque on its northern flank into the Laguna de Negro Francisco, where a peninsula marks the position of the most extensive moraine.

== Eruptive history ==
Jotabeche was active between 7 and 5 mya ago, spanning the late Miocene and Pliocene. The end of volcanic activity at Jotabeche occurred at the same time as the northeastern arm of the Juan Fernandez ridge passed beneath the volcano. After end of activity at Jotabeche volcanism occurred farther east at Incapillo. 15.3 ± 0.8 and 17.2 ± 0.7 mya the Las Gallinas ignimbrite formed east of Jotabeche, but its origin is unknown.

The Santa Cecilia domes of Jotabeche were active 24.3 ± 0.7 mya and 24.1 ± 0.8 mya based on potassium-argon dating of an eroded tuff ring. Between 18 and 16 mya the Jotabeche Norte stratovolcano was active in the region. Some rhyolitic lava domes intruded into the caldera are 10 mya old. The Negro Francisco ignimbrite was erupted 8.5 mya ago and covers a surface area of 39.05 square kilometres (15.08 sq mi) around the Laguna del Negro Francisco; it is the initial activity of Jotabeche. 5.9–6.2 mya the Jotabeche ignimbrite covered a surface area of 3.18 square kilometres (1.23 sq mi). The Negro Francisco ignimbrite was erupted from a NW-trending fault and flowed between the Jotabeche Norte and La Laguna stratovolcanoes to the Laguna del Negro Francisco depression and across it. The so-called Pircas Negras andesitic lava flows occur at the same time as the younger Jotabeche activity. Andesitic-dacitic lava domes along the La Gallina fault are of the same age.

At Copiapo and Jotabeche, the volcanic activity has been subdivided in three phases, the first being the "normal" volcanic phase, a second phase with a drop in magma supply and the formation of more differentiated magmas in crustal magma chambers such as rhyolites and at the end the eruption of andesites along fractures. Other volcanoes in the Maricunga belt display different evolutionary processes, probably because of a lesser tectonic influence.

== Archeology ==
Research performed on Jotabeche in the 1980s demonstrated the existence of an Inka shrine on Jotabeche, including a walled platform. People probably climbed the mountain to use it during the southern summer months. Archeological sites in the region are not unknown: Copiapo, Incahuasi, Pastillitos and Los Patos also have archeological sites.

== See also ==
- Ojos de Maricunga
