= Baboso =

Mountain peak in Argentina

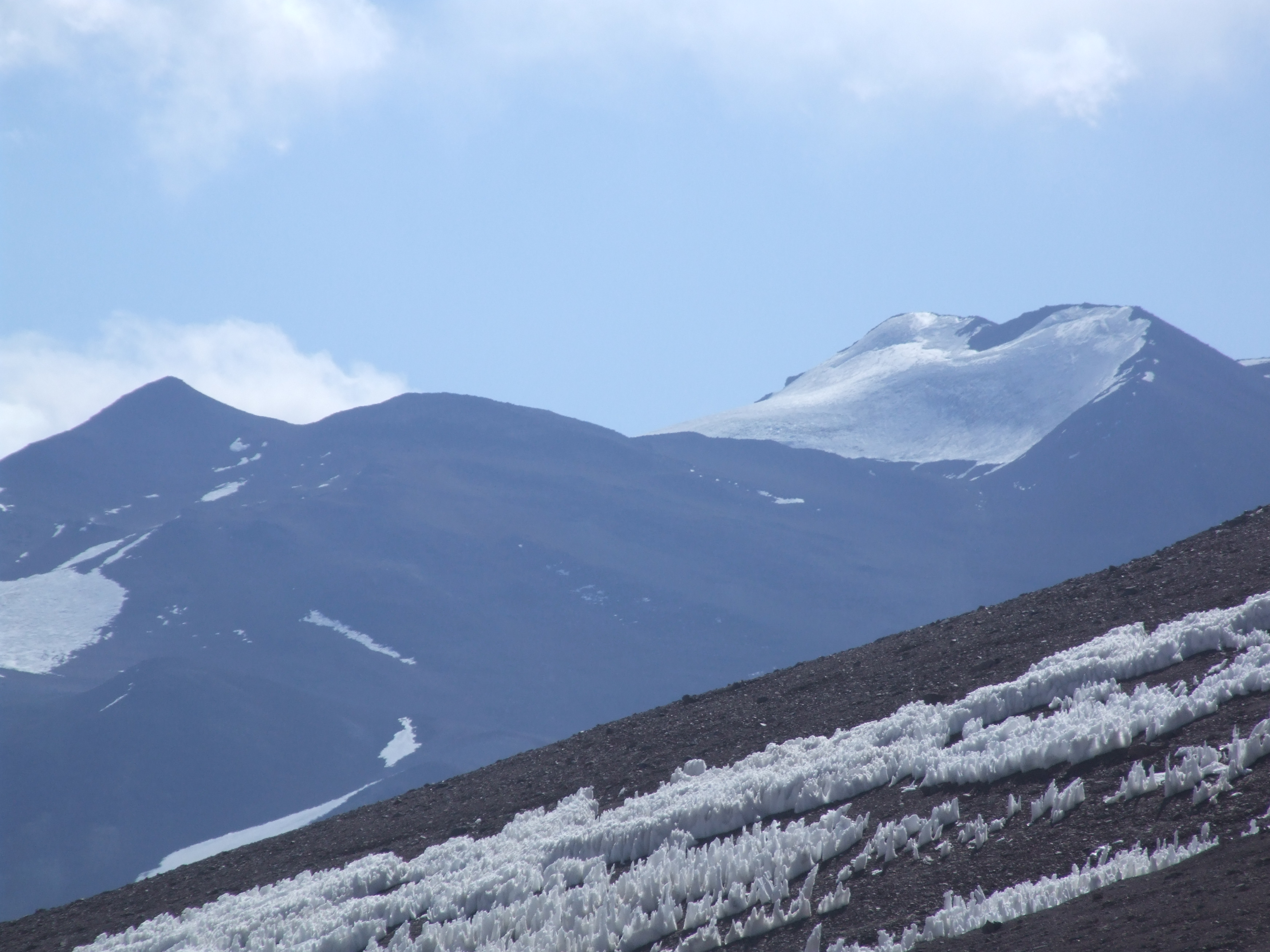
- Baboso seen from the Cordon de los Pioneros.

Highest point
- Elevation: 6,070 m (19,910 ft)
- Prominence: 608 m (1,995 ft)
- Parent peak: Bonete
- Coordinates: 28°01′S 68°54′W

Geography
- Location: Argentina
- Parent range: Andes

Climbing
- First ascent: 11/06/2000 – John Biggar, Gordon Biggar, Peter Clarke, Peter Gilbert, Brian Powling, (UK) and Damian Aurelio Vargas (Peru)
- Easiest route: Southwest ridge

Baboso is a remote peak near Veladero in the province of La Rioja (municipality of Vinchina) in the Argentine Puna de Atacama, with an elevation of 6,070 metres (19,915 ft) metres. The peak is also sometimes known as Veladero Northeast. The peak has one of the largest glaciers in the Puna de Atacama on its southern flank, and one of the few glaciers other than the ones on Monte Pissis to have open crevasses.

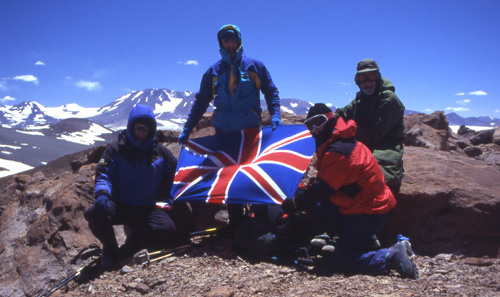
The first ascent team on Baboso summit

== First ascent ==
It was one of the last 6,000m+ peaks in the Andes to be climbed. Baboso was first climbed by John Biggar, Gordon Biggar, Peter Clarke, Peter Gilbert, Brian Powling, (UK) and Damian Aurelio Vargas (Peru) June 11, 2000. AAJ 1997 page 243 shows a previous ascent on 20/11/1996 when German del Rio and Jorge Llanos approached the peak on motorbikes. However, in an interview with John Biggar, he proved they did not reach the summit.

== Elevation ==
Other data from available digital elevation models: SRTM yields 6,055 metres, ASTER 6,069 metres and TanDEM-X 6,097 metres. The height of the nearest key col is 5,462 meters, leading to a topographic prominence of 608 meters. Baboso is considered a Mountain according to the Dominance System and its dominance is 10.02%. Its parent peak is Bonete Chico and the Topographic isolation is 15.2 kilometers.
