= Incapillo =

Pleistocene caldera in Argentina

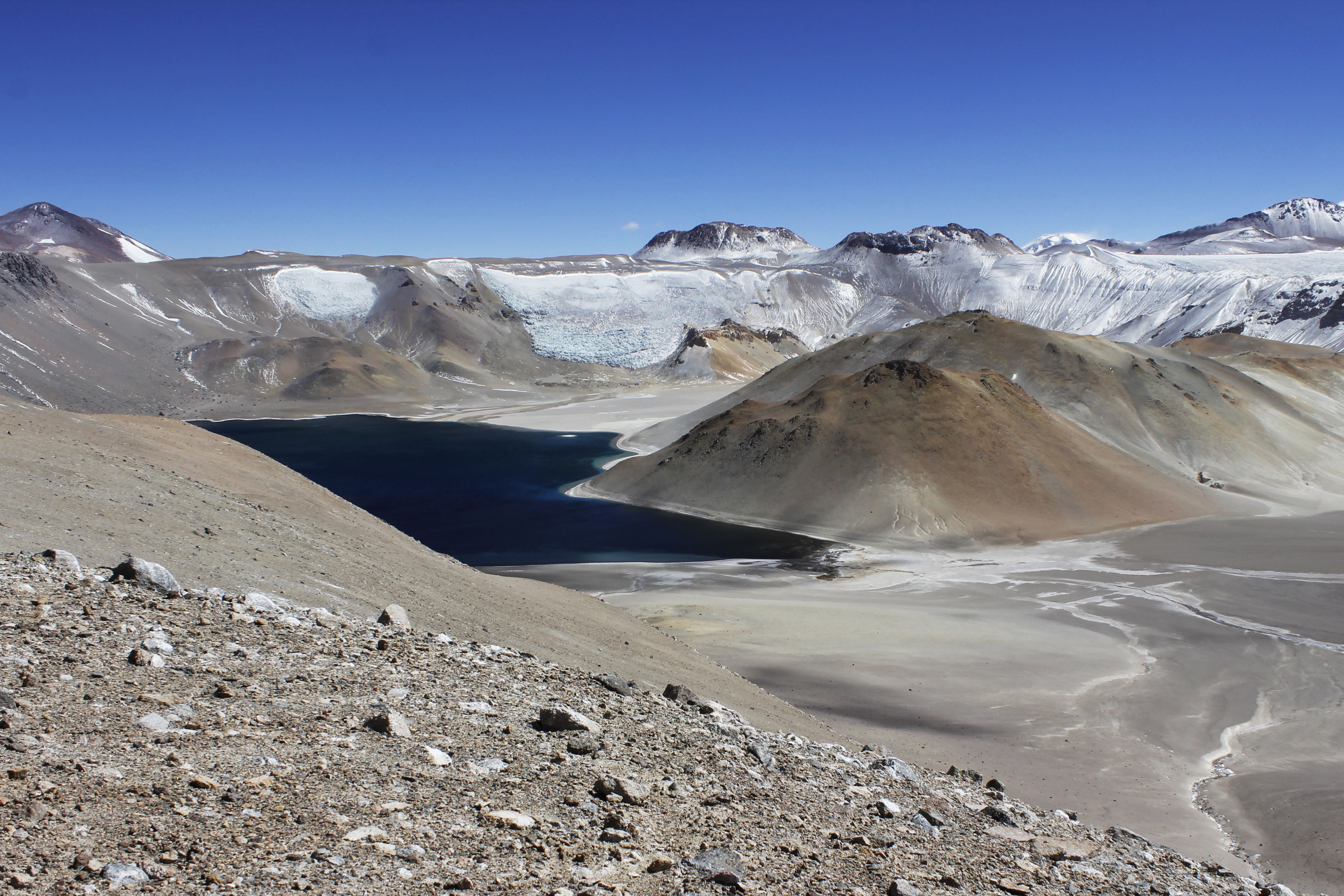
- View inside the caldera

Highest point
- Elevation: 5,750 or 5,386 m (18,865 or 17,671 ft)
- Coordinates: 27°53′24″S 68°49′12″W

Geography
- Location within Argentina
- Location: Central Argentina
- Parent range: Andes

Geology
- Rock age: Pleistocene
- Mountain type: Caldera
- Volcanic belt: Andean Volcanic Belt
- Last eruption: <0.52 ± 0.03–0.51 ± 0.04 mya

Incapillo is a Pleistocene-age caldera (a depression formed by the collapse of a volcano) in the La Rioja Province of Argentina. It is the southernmost volcanic centre in the Andean Central Volcanic Zone (CVZ) that erupted during the Pleistocene. Incapillo is one of several ignimbrite (Note: Ignimbrites are volcanic rocks formed when hot gas and rocks emitted during an eruption consolidate to form a rock.) or caldera systems that, along with 44 active stratovolcanoes, comprise the CVZ.

Subduction of the Nazca Plate beneath the South American Plate is responsible for most of the volcanism in the CVZ. After activity in the volcanic arc of the western Maricunga Belt ceased six million years ago, volcanism commenced in the Incapillo region, forming the high volcanic edifices Monte Pissis, Cerro Bonete Chico and Sierra de Veladero. Later, a number of lava domes were emplaced between these volcanoes.

Incapillo is the source of the Incapillo ignimbrite, a medium-sized deposit comparable to the Katmai ignimbrite. The Incapillo ignimbrite was erupted 0.52 ± 0.03 and 0.51 ± 0.04 million years ago and has a volume of about 20.4 cubic kilometres (4.9 cu mi). A caldera with dimensions of 5 by 6 kilometres (3.1 mi × 3.7 mi) formed during the eruption. Later volcanism generated more lava domes within the caldera and a debris flow in the Sierra de Veladero. The lake within the caldera may overlie an area of ongoing hydrothermal activity.

== Geography and structure ==
Incapillo, located in Argentina's La Rioja province, is the highest caldera stemming from explosive volcanism in the world. The name Incapillo means 'Crown of the Inca' in Quechua; it is also known as Bonete caldera, Corona del Inca or Inca Pillo. The surrounding mountain peaks were visited by pre-Hispanic people. The crater is marketed as a tourist destination, with visits possible between December and April.

Incapillo is part of the Andean Central Volcanic Zone (CVZ), which extends through the countries of Chile, Bolivia, and Argentina and includes six or more Quaternary caldera or ignimbrite systems, about 44 stratovolcanoes, and over 18 smaller centres. One of these stratovolcanoes, Ojos del Salado, is the world's highest volcano. This zone also includes the Altiplano–Puna volcanic complex and the Galán caldera south of it. Incapillo is the southernmost volcano of the CVZ that erupted during the Pleistocene; the next volcano to the south to have erupted during the Pleistocene epoch is Tupungato in the Southern Volcanic Zone at 33° southern latitude.

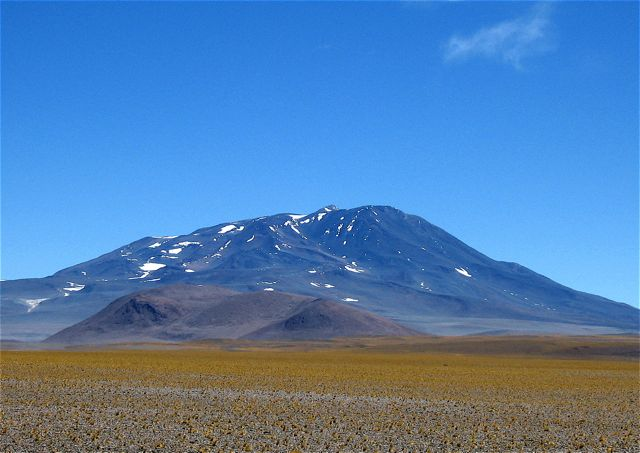
Cerro Bonete Chico

Incapillo is a caldera with a diameter of 5 by 6 kilometres (3.1 mi × 3.7 mi) and lies at an elevation of 5,750 metres (18,860 ft) or 5,386 metres (17,671 ft). The three adjacent volcanic centres of Monte Pissis (6,882 metres (22,579 ft)), Cerro Bonete Grande (6,436 metres (21,115 ft)), and Cerro Bonete Chico (6,759 metres (22,175 ft)) are also considered part of the Incapillo volcanic complex and are among the highest on Earth. These centres surround the ignimbrite and lava domes. The caldera is about 400 metres (1,300 ft) deep and its walls reach heights of 250 metres (820 ft). The pumice-containing Incapillo ignimbrite forms the bulk of the caldera walls.

Forty lava domes surround the caldera, distributed in a northwest–southeast pattern. There is an eastern group of lava domes between Monte Pissis and Cerro Bonete Chico, and a western one on the Sierra de Veladero. The domes have heights of 100–600 metres (300–2,000 ft), and eroded dome material forms an apron about 1 kilometre (0.6 mi) in width around many of them. The aprons consist of erosional material. Some domes have water-filled craters with widths of 20 metres (66 ft) at their top. Domes on the caldera's northern side are dacitic and show signs of hydrothermal alteration. Some domes are probably part of the pre-caldera volcanic complex, and several rhyodacitic domes were eroded after caldera formation; these were formerly considered erosional remnants. Older domes have reddish oxidised colours in satellite images. The total combined volume of the domes is about 16 cubic kilometres (3.8 cu mi).

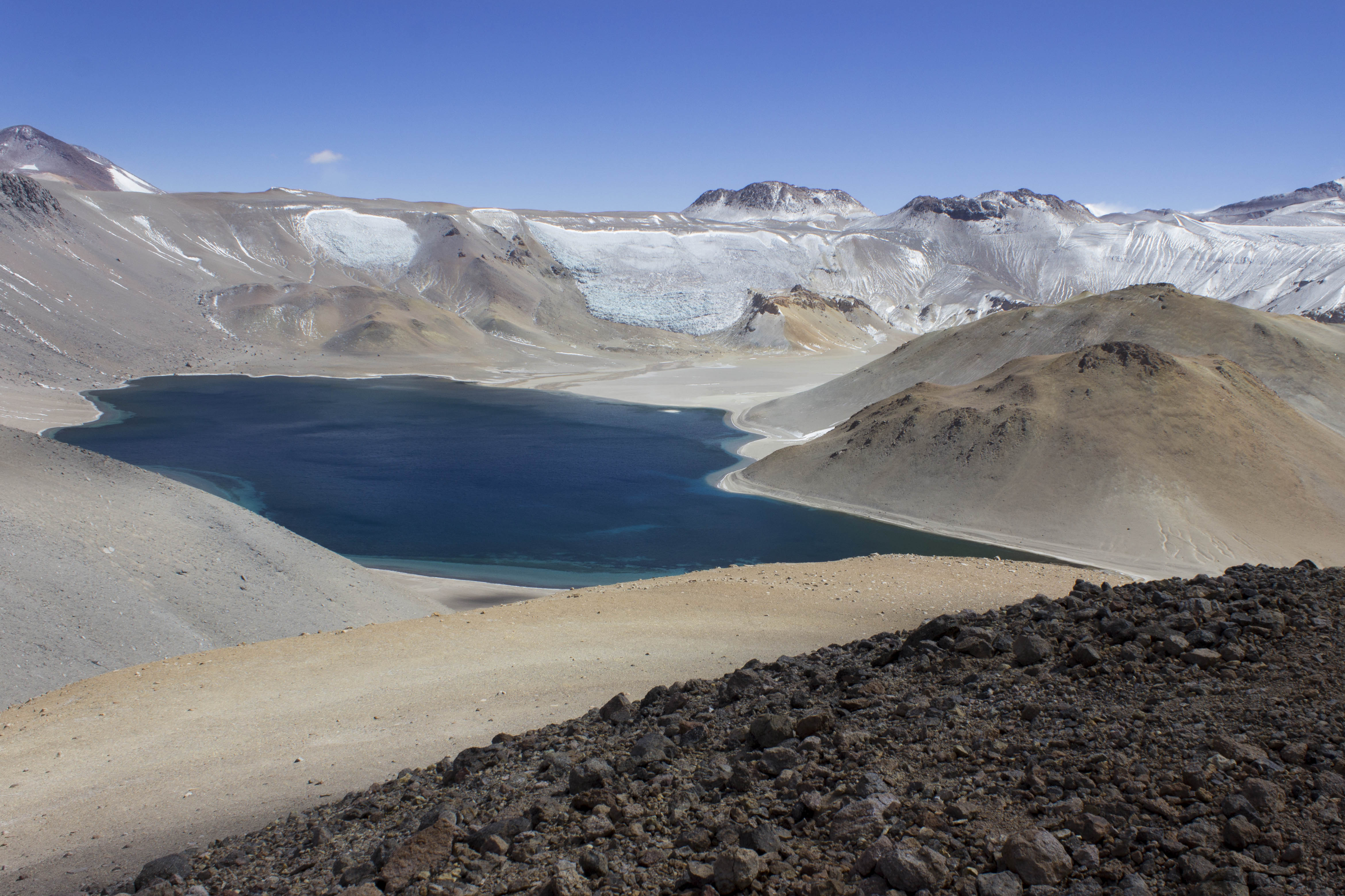
Laguna Corona del Inca, with a lava dome to the right

The Laguna Corona del Inca, considered to be the highest navigable lake in the world, lies next to a heavily altered lava dome in the centre of the caldera. Various dimensions have been reported: The lake may be either 350-metre (1,150 ft) or 13-metre (43 ft) deep, it might lie at 5,300 metres (17,400 ft) or 5,495 metres (18,028 ft) altitude, and its surface area has been variously given as 2 by 1 kilometre (1.24 mi × 0.62 mi), 3.34 square kilometres (334 ha) between 1986 and 2017 or 1.8 square kilometres (0.69 sq mi). The lake has probably generated the evaporite and lacustrine deposits that lie on the caldera floor. Water temperatures of 13 °C (55 °F) obtained by satellite measurements suggest that hydrothermal activity persists in the lake. The lake is fed by meltwater; its surface area declined between 1986 and 2017. Other lakes occur in topographic depressions.

== Geology ==
The Nazca plate is subducting beneath the South American plate in the area of the CVZ at a speed of 7–9 centimetres (2.8–3.5 in) per year. The subduction results in volcanism along the Occidental Cordillera 240–300 kilometres (150–190 mi) east of the trench formed by the subduction.

Incapillo is one of at least six different ignimbrite or caldera volcanoes that are part of the CVZ in Chile, Bolivia and Argentina. The CVZ is one of four different volcanic arcs in the Andes. The Maricunga Belt, about 50 kilometres (31 mi) west of Incapillo, is where volcanism started 27 million years ago. Phases of ignimbritic and stratovolcanic activity occurred, including Copiapo volcano, until activity ceased with the last eruption of Nevado de Jotabeche 6 million years ago. South of Incapillo, the Pampean flat slab region is associated with tectonic deformation and lack of volcanic activity until Tupungatito volcano farther south.

S. L. de Silva and P. Francis suggested in their 1991 book Volcanoes of the Central Andes that the CVZ should be subdivided into two systems of volcanoes: one in Peru and another in Chile, on the basis of the orientation (northwest–southeast versus north–south). Charles R. Stern notes that C.A. Wood, G. McLaughlin and P. Francis in a 1987 paper at the American Geophysical Union instead suggested a subdivision into nine different groups.

=== Local ===
Incapillo is on crust that is 70-kilometre (43 mi) thick – among the thickest in volcanic regions of Earth. Several studies indicate that trends in the isotope ratios of Incapillo's volcanic rocks are because of a thickening crust and increased contribution thereof to the magmas. At the latitude of Incapillo, the northern Antofalla terrane borders the Cuyania terrane. The terranes have distinct origins and were attached to South America during the Ordovician (Note: Between 485.4±1.9 and 443.8±1.5 million years ago.).

At the latitude of Incapillo, subduction of the Nazca Plate beneath the South American Plate abruptly shallows towards the south. This shallowing forms the limit between the volcanically active CVZ and the magmatically inactive Pampean flat slab region farther south. This magmatic inactivity occurs because the flat slab removes the asthenospheric wedge. A magma-containing structure called the Incapillo-Bonete Magma Body has been identified at 0–50 kilometres (0–31 mi) depth under Incapillo.

Incapillo is part of a volcanic system active between 3.5 and 2 million years ago that includes Ojos del Salado and Nevado Tres Cruces. It was the last volcanic centre formed in the region; one view is that subsequently, the shallowing of the subducting slab prevented volcanism east and south of it. Another view considers Incapillo as part of a northeast–southwest trend with Cerro Galan and Cerro Blanco. This trend may be related to delamination of the lower crust. Also, these centres are located between two domains of different rigidity, an Ordovician sedimentary domain of low rigidity and a higher rigidity basement.

The formation of the older lava domes may have been influenced by buried faults or the supply systems of the older Pissis and Bonete Chico volcanoes. Isotope and composition data suggest that the magma of Incapillo formed at relatively constrained depths of approximately 65–70 kilometres (40–43 mi) above the shallow slab. A focus of seismic activity is found at Incapillo and a weak seismic velocity anomaly beneath the principal mountain range may be linked to its waning activity.

=== Composition ===
The Incapillo ignimbrite is formed by potassium-rich and magnesium-poor rhyodacite, forming glassy and porous pumice with individual clasts of 5–20 centimetres (2–8 in) in diameter. Typical pumice contains crystals of biotite, hornblende, plagioclase, quartz, and sanidine, with minor amounts of apatite, iron oxides, and titanite. The lava domes have uniform crystalline compositions that are richer in magnesium than the ignimbrite. The lava dome rocks contain phenocrysts of amphibole, biotite, plagioclase, quartz, and titanite. Some domes contain in addition alkali feldspar. Older domes have higher amphibole and lower quartz content than younger domes. Post-caldera domes are strongly hydrothermally altered.

Rocks from Incapillo are rich in sodium and have high ratios of lanthanum and samarium to ytterbium and high ratios of barium to lanthanum, as well as high lead-206 to lead-204 and strontium-87/strontium-86 ratios. These rare-earth element patterns are similar to the Late Miocene Maricunga Belt rocks and contrast to early Miocene rocks. The changes in rare-earth element patterns occurred at the same time as the arc migrated eastward, terminating activity in the Maricunga Belt. The element ratios are pronouncedly arc-like with some adakitic signatures. The rocks contain considerably more sodium and alumina than almost all Central Andes siliceous volcanic rocks.

The composition of the lava domes suggests that they were formed by degassed magma left behind by the caldera-forming eruption. The pre-caldera lava domes were generated either directly from a common magma chamber or indirectly through secondary chambers. The lead isotope ratios indicate that the volcano formed at the edge of an area of granite and rhyolite of Paleozoic age. Incapillo magmas probably formed as adakitic high-pressure mafic magmas derived from the crust, either directly by anatexis or indirectly from dragged-down crustal fragments. The magmas were then modified by crustal contamination and fractional crystallisation. As the subducting slab shallowed, crustal garnet-containing lherzolite and granulite-eclogite—contributed both from the crustal basis and forearc rocks that were dragged down by the subducting slab—became an increasingly important component of erupted magmas. Eventually, the Incapillo magma chamber was disconnected from the mantle and lower crust.

The Incapillo ignimbrite contains xenoliths with sizes of 0.5–4 centimetres (0.2–1.6 in) formed by amphibolite. Amphibole is the dominant component. Amphibole crystals are enclosed in intersitital plagioclase crystals and sometimes contain secondary biotite crystals. Raw sulfur deposits occur on the volcano.

== Climate, hydrology and vegetation ==
Incapillo as a high-altitude location has an alpine climate, with low temperatures and low oxygen, high winds and predominantly summer precipitation. Incapillo itself has no weather stations and thus exact climate data are not available; however, Laguna Brava farther south has an average precipitation of 300 millimetres (12 in) and an average temperature of 0–5 °C (32–41 °F). The Desaguadero River (Río Desaguadero) originates on Bonete.

Vegetation varies depending on water supply and altitude, reaching up to elevations of 4,300–5,000 metres (14,100–16,400 ft); below that, the vegetation takes the form of a scrub steppe. Grasses at 5,000 metres (16,000 ft) include Festuca, Stipa and in wetter areas also genera like Calamagrostis. Scrub like Adesmia and Nototriche copon occasionally form dense patches.

== Geologic history ==
Activity at Incapillo commenced shortly after the end of the Maricunga Belt volcanism and occurred first at Monte Pissis between 6.5 and 3.5 million years ago (mya). Further volcanism occurred south of Incapillo 4.7±0.5 mya, at Sierra de Veladero 5.6±1 – 3.6±0.5 mya, and in the region of Cerro Bonete Chico 5.2±0.6 – 3.5±0.1 mya. Some of the 3–2 mya Pircas Negras mafic andesites appear to be associated with the Incapillo volcanic complex. These rocks form the last pulse of the Pircas Negras volcanism. Specific ages of the Pircas Negras flows in the Incapillo region include 4.7±0.5 mya, 3.2±0.3 mya and 1.9±0.2 mya. Andesitic-rhyolitic volcanism formed ignimbrites and lava domes 2.9±0.4 – 1.1±0.4 mya, with the youngest pre-caldera dome being 0.873±0.077 mya old. The lava domes formed through non-explosive extrusion.

The Incapillo ignimbrite is unwelded and covers a surface area of 80.47 square kilometres (31.07 sq mi), extending to a distance of 15 kilometres (9.3 mi) from the caldera. The ignimbrite appears in an eastward-heading ephemeral river valley and the southern Quebrada del Veladero, and possibly also next to the Rio Salado headwaters. Thicknesses range from 10 to 250 metres (33 to 820 ft); the ignimbrite is underlain by a lithic-and-ash rich surge deposit with a thickness of 5 centimetres (2 in). The ignimbrite displays banding features away from the caldera and in Quebrada de Veladero football-sized clasts are mixed within fine ash. Rocks from the ignimbrites farther away from their source indicate the ignimbrite probably formed from the mixing of less viscous dacitic magma with rhyolite. The total volume of the ignimbrite is about 20.4 cubic kilometres (4.9 cu mi). Ages of 0.52 ± 0.03 and 0.51 ± 0.04 mya ago have been found. It is a rhyodacitic to rhyolitic ignimbrite with high crystal and pumice and low lithic content. The dense rock equivalent volume is about 14 cubic kilometres (3.4 cu mi). The volume of the Incapillo ignimbrite is comparable to that of the Katmai ignimbrite. The Incapillo ignimbrite was probably formed from a low-height fountaining eruption without a high eruption column, forming a base surge first and pyroclastic flows later. The change from lava dome to ignimbrite-forming eruptions may have been triggered by the injection of hotter magmas into the magma chamber. A less likely theory is that the shift was caused by changes in the tectonic context. During the eruption, a piston-like collapse formed the caldera.

Later, a debris flow named Veladero (also known as Quebrada de Veladero Ignimbrite) occurred in a glacier valley south of the caldera. It is rich in lithics and pumice. These lithics are derived from Sierra de Veladero, Cerro Bonete Chico, and Pircas Negras lavas. The debris flow ranges from 15 to 25 metres (49 to 82 ft) in thickness 5 kilometres (3.1 mi) south of the caldera to 10 to 15 metres (33 to 49 ft) farther south, the total volume being 0.7–0.5 cubic kilometres (0.17–0.12 cu mi). The debris flow does have a different composition from the main Incapillo ignimbrite as it contains red-brown dacite and clasts. It has a massive ungraded composition and is likely a lahar or debris flow deposit, probably influenced by glacial or crater lake water. Wind-driven effects have generated hummocky ridges.

There are no dates available for post-caldera lava domes, which probably arose from magma ascending through the caldera-forming conduits, as these domes are found only inside the caldera. The elevated temperatures of the caldera lake suggest that hydrothermal activity still occurs beneath Incapillo. Seismic tomography has identified the presence of an at least partially molten structure beneath the volcano.
