= Maricunga =

Maricunga may refer to:

- Maricunga Gold Belt, a mineral-rich region in northern Chile
- Maricunga mine, a gold mine in northern Chile
- Salar de Maricunga, a salt flat in the Andes of northern Chile
