= Jan Szczepański =

Jan Szczepański can refer to:

- Jan Szczepański (boxer) (1939–2017) Polish boxer
- Jan Szczepański (sociologist) (1913–2004)
- Jan Alfred Szczepański (1902–1991), film and theatre critic
- Jan Józef Szczepański (1919–2003), writer
