= Doña Ines =

Volcano in Chile

- Location within Chile

Highest point
- Elevation: 5,075 m (16,650 ft)
- Coordinates: 26°04′40″S 69°11′06″W

Geology
- Rock age: Miocene
- Mountain type: Stratovolcano
- Volcanic arc: Maricunga Belt

Doña Ines is a volcano in Chile. It is a Miocene age stratovolcano which is formed from lava domes that form its summit area and nuee ardente deposits which form the flanks of the volcano.

Located north of the Salar de Pedernales, Doña Ines is a 5,075 metres (16,650 ft) high cone with a diameter of 15 kilometres (9.3 mi). Lava domes form the top of the volcano and pyroclastic flow deposits are found on its flanks, generating a noticeable slope contrast between the steeper upper parts of the edifice and the more gentle lower slopes. The nuee ardente deposits contain blocks with sizes of up to 2 metres (6 ft 7 in). Overall the volcano covers a surface area of about 200 square kilometres (77 sq mi). Additional lava domes can be found on the eastern slopes of the volcano. A subsidiary vent, active at the same time as the main volcano, has formed the Loma Dona Ines rocks south of the main volcano. The Gemelas-Fortuna volcanic centres lie nearby. The basement beneath the volcano on its northern side is formed by Triassic sedimentary and volcanic rocks.

Doña Ines is part of the Maricunga Belt, a volcanic arc at the western edge of the Puna plateau. Doña Ines together with Cerros Bravos, La Coipa and the Maricunga volcanoes lies in the northern part of the belt, 50–60 kilometres (31–37 mi) west of the Central Volcanic Zone. Volcanic activity within this belt has generated a number of mineral deposits. Doña Ines lies in the northern part of the belt. It is considered part of a volcanic chain with the Pastillito and Volcan de la Sal cones, probably dependent on tectonic fractures, which lies in a 250 kilometres (160 mi) long north-south valley. The volcano is the source of the Inez Chica ignimbrite, a rhyolitic ignimbrite erupted 16.2 million years ago which covers a surface area of 5.32 square kilometres (2.05 sq mi).

The volcano has erupted andesite and dacite, both containing hornblende. The rocks of the summit lava domes contain hornblende, plagioclase and smaller amounts of orthopyroxene. The rocks of Doña Ines have a SiO_{2} content between 56 and 64%. Based on the composition of amphibole, the amphibole crystals formed in magmas with temperatures spanning 901–1,016 °C (1,654–1,861 °F), with the central vent magmas having higher temperatures at amphibole crystallization and also showing evidence of a more complex magma system.

The stratovolcano was active approximately 15 million years ago, during the Miocene. A date of 15.0 ± 0.3 million years ago has been obtained on one lava flow.

== See also ==
- Ojos de Maricunga

== Sources ==
- Kay, Suzanne Mahlburg; Mpodozis, Constantino; Tittler, Andrew; Cornejo, Paula (December 1994). "Tertiary Magmatic Evolution of the Maricunga Mineral Belt in Chile". International Geology Review. 36 (12): 1079–1112. Bibcode:1994IGRv...36.1079K. doi:10.1080/00206819409465506.
