= Ojos de Maricunga =

Volcano in Chile

Coordinates: 27°00′S 69°13′W

Ojos de Maricunga is a volcano in the Maricunga Belt of Chile (Mpodozis et al. 1995, p. 278), in the Cordillera Domeyko.(Muñoz 1894, p. 51)

Ojos de Maricunga is part of the Maricunga Belt, a volcanic area of Oligocene to Pliocene age consisting of lava domes and stratovolcanoes(Lohmeier et al. 2019, p. 375) that developed just south of the present-day Central Volcanic Zone of the Andes and is associated with metal ore deposits(Lohmeier et al. 2019, p. 374). The volcano was active during a time in the Miocene where volcanism in the Maricunga belt had increased. Other volcanoes active at that time were Cadillal, Dona Ines, north Jotabeche, La Laguna, Pastillitos, Santa Rosa and Villalobos.(Mpodozis et al. 1995, p. 278)

Ojos de Maricunga is 4,985 metres (16,355 ft) high and has a circumference of 15 kilometres (9.3 mi). It is the largest stratovolcano of the middle Miocene in the Maricunga Belt (Kay et al. 1994, p. 1087). Its exposed surface consists mostly of andesitic lava flows(Mpodozis et al. 1995, pp. 279–280) although the volcano itself is formed mostly by pyroclastic flows(Lohmeier et al. 2019, p. 378). A northwest-southeast elongated, roughly 4 kilometres (2.5 mi) long crater or caldera caps off the edifice (Mpodozis et al. 1995, pp. 279–280). It contains a lava dome formed by biotite and hornblende containing dacite (Kay et al. 1994, p. 1087). Ignimbrites occur on the foot of the volcano, mostly on the eastern and southwestern side (Mpodozis et al. 1995, pp. 279–280). There appear to be at least two ignimbrites whose composition and age resembles that of Ojos de Maricunga and neighbouring volcanoes (Kay et al. 1994, p. 1087). In fact, Ojos de Maricunga may be the source of ash flows (Gonzalez-Ferran, Baker & Rex 1985, p. 427).

Volcanic rocks include andesite and dacite, with potassium contents in the middle to high range and elemental compositions reflecting volcanic arc petrologies (Kay et al. 1994, p. 1099). Exposures in the caldera have a porphyritic texture (Gonzalez-Ferran, Baker & Rex 1985, p. 427). Overall SiO_{2} content of Ojos de Maricunga rocks is 61-64% (Kay et al. 1994, p. 1081) and dominant phenocryst phases are plagioclase and additional clinopyroxene, magnetite, orthopyroxene and quartz(Lohmeier et al. 2019, p. 378).

The volcano was active 16-15 million years ago (Kay et al. 1994, p. 1081). Potassium-argon dating has been performed both on the central lava dome and the andesite lava flows. The former show ages of 15.8 ± 0.9 million years ago and the latter 15.1 ± 0.7 million years ago (Mpodozis et al. 1995, pp. 279–280). Other ages are 16.2 ± 0.6 and 16.1 ± 0.8 million years ago for the slope deposits (Kay et al. 1994, p. 1087). One ignimbrite was erupted 15.8 million years ago.(Coira et al. 2014, pp. 147–160) The Ojos de Maricunga ignimbrites were once considered to be Quaternary and that the "San Andes" flows dated at 9.15 ± 0.15 million years ago originated from Ojos de Maricunga (Gonzalez-Ferran, Baker & Rex 1985, p. 427). Presently, the volcano is partially eroded (Lohmeier et al. 2019, p. 375).

Santa Rosa volcano has a similar architecture and lies southwest of Ojos de Maricunga. The Salar de Maricunga lies northeast of Ojos de Maricunga. The Laguna Santa Rosa lies southeast of Ojos de Maricunga and the west flowing Quebrada Paipate originates on the volcano's southern slope (Mpodozis et al. 1995, pp. 279–280). The watershed of the Copiapo River borders Ojos de Maricunga to the west (Muñoz 1894, p. 20). The Cerro Maricunga gold mining project is located on Ojos de Maricunga (Lohmeier et al. 2019, p. 375).
