= Nacimientos del Jague =

Mountain in the Andes of Argentina

- Location within Argentina

Highest point
- Elevation: 5,826 m (19,114 ft)
- Prominence: 584 metres (1,916 ft)
- Parent peak: Pissis
- Coordinates: 27°47′41.27″S 068°37′23.51″W

Geography
- Parent range: Argentine Andes, Andes

Climbing
- First ascent: 12/11/1996 - John Biggar and Gordon Biggar (Scotland)

Nacimientos del Jague is a mountain in Argentina with an elevation of 5,826 metres (19,114 ft) metres.

== Location ==
Nacimientos del Jague is within the following mountain ranges: Argentine Andes, Puna de Atacama. Its territory is within the Argentinean protection area of Catamarca High Andean and Puna Lakes Ramsar Site. It is on the border of two provinces: Argentinean provinces of La Rioja and Catamarca. Its slopes are within 2 cities: Argentinean cities of Vinchina and Fiambalá.

== First Ascent ==
Nacimientos del Jague was first climbed by John Biggar and Gordon Biggar (Scotland) on November 12, 1996.

== Elevation ==
Based on the elevation provided by the available Digital elevation models, SRTM filled with ASTER (5826 metres), TanDEM-X (5861 metrss), Nacimientos del Jague is about 5826 meters above sea level.

The height of the nearest key col is 5242 meters, therefore its prominence is 584 meters. Nacimientos del Jague is listed as mountain, based on the Dominance system and its dominance is 10.02%. Its parent peak is Pissis and the Topographic isolation is 17.8 kilometers.
