= Laguna del Negro Francisco =

Lake in Atacama Region, Chile

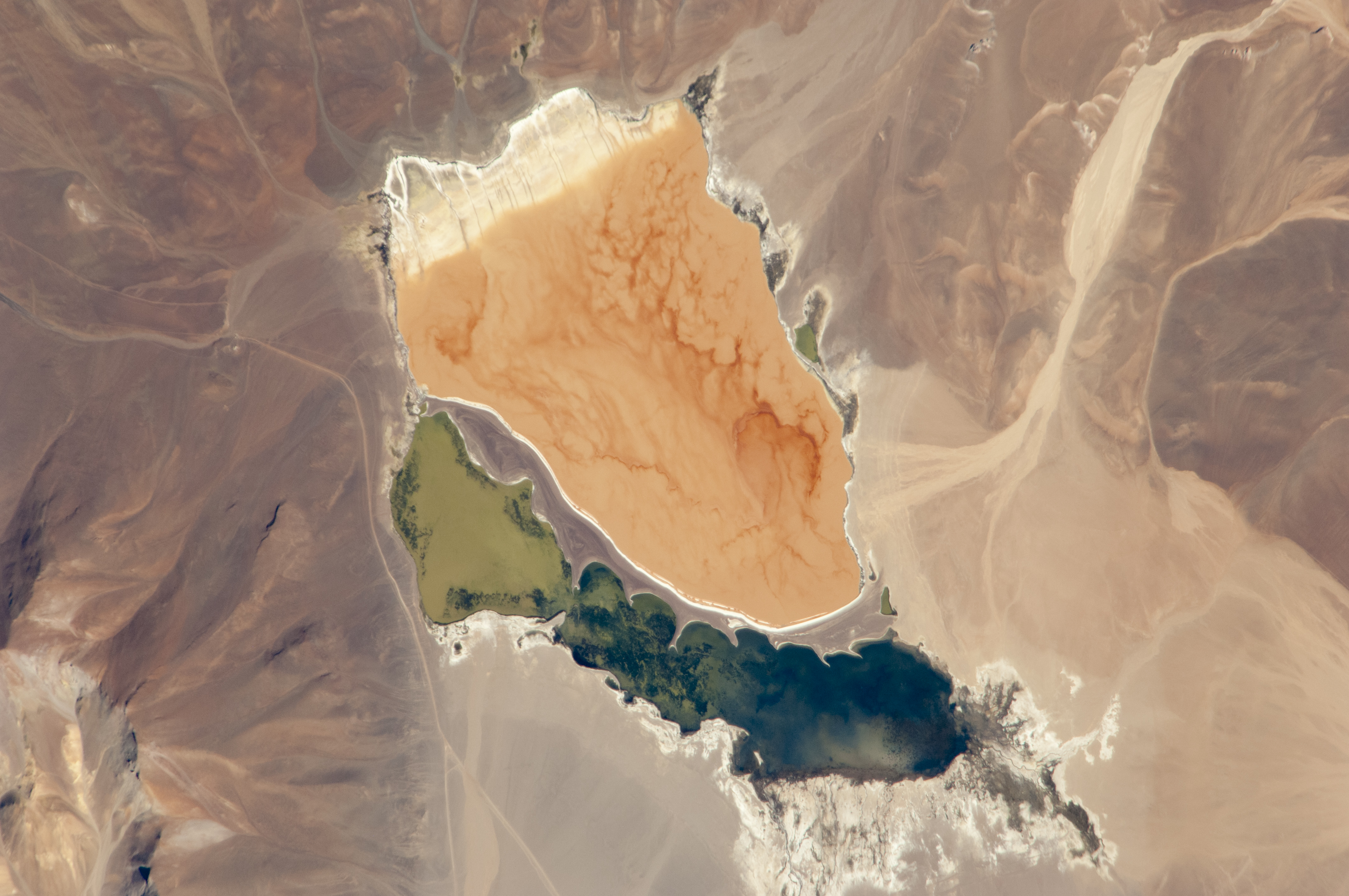

- Location within Chile
- Location: Atacama Region
- Coordinates: 27°28′S 69°14′W
- Catchment area: 930 square kilometres (360 sq mi)
- Basin countries: Chile
- Surface area: 20.7 square kilometres (8.0 sq mi)
- Average depth: 1 metre (3 ft 3 in)
- Surface elevation: 4,125 metres (13,533 ft)

Laguna del Negro Francisco is a lake in the Atacama Region of Chile and the southernmost closed lake in the country. It is situated 200 kilometres (120 mi) northeast of the city of Copiapó. The lake is about 10 kilometres (6.2 mi) long and 4 kilometres (2.5 mi) wide with a surface area of about 20.7 square kilometres (8.0 sq mi) and a depth of about 1 metre (3 ft 3 in). A peninsula, probably formed by a moraine and subsequently modified by wind-driven accumulation of sand, separates the lake into a north-northwesterly and a south-southeasterly half with different colour and water composition.

The lake is of tectonic origin and lies within a basin bordered by mountain ranges to the east and the west and two volcanoes north and south. It formed when the Astaburuaga River was redirected into the lake basin from the east, and this river is also its main source of water. Water levels have fluctuated over the last 6,000 years and the lake is currently in a period of low water level. In 1996 the lake was classified as a Ramsar site and it currently lies within the Nevado Tres Cruces National Park. In the past there were plans to redirect water flowing into the lake to the Copiapó River; presently a mining company holds water rights to the Astaburuaga River.

== Geography and geomorphology ==
Laguna del Negro Francisco lies 200 kilometres (120 mi) northeast of the city of Copiapó in the Atacama Region of Chile, and can be reached by south-bound roads that diverge from the Copiapó-Tinogasta road close to the Salar de Maricunga. A National Forest Corporation building is close to the southwestern shore of the lake. The area has been called a "scenic beauty".

The lake lies at an elevation of 4,125 metres (13,533 ft), is 10 by 4 kilometres (6.2 mi × 2.5 mi) wide and has a surface area of 20.7 square kilometres (8.0 sq mi), but a depth of only about 1 metre (3 ft 3 in); the Ministry of Public Works estimated a mean depth of 7 metres (23 ft) in 1941. The water surface can fluctuate between 17–31 square kilometres (6.6–12.0 sq mi) from year to year.

The lake is subdivided into a northern or northwestern and a southern or southeastern part by a 20 metres (66 ft) high peninsula, on which wave action has led to the formation of sand spits. The peninsula was formed either by wind-driven accumulation of sand as a sandbank or as a moraine left by a former glaciation. Under present-day water levels, the sandbank separates the lake into two parts with different water composition: The southern part has fresher water and thus has a different colour than the saline northern part, as wetlands formed in the southern part.

Regional rivers; Laguna de Negro Francisco and Rio Astaburuaga are upper-right of centre

The land around the lake is formed by alluvial fans and in the eastern sector by alluvial deposits such as gravels, sands and silts. A number of mountains surround the lake, such as the 6,080 metres (19,950 ft) high Copiapó and the 5,880 metres (19,290 ft) Jotabeche.

The Astaburuaga River enters the lake on its eastern shore; it originates on the mountains east of Laguna del Negro Francisco where it is nourished by snowmelt. Other tributaries are the Quebrada Azufre in the northwest, Rio de la Sal in the northeast and Rio La Gallina in the southwest; the tributaries of Laguna del Negro Francisco feature wetlands and marsh vegetation has developed at the mouth of the Astaburuaga.

=== Hydrology and biology ===
The lake is polymictic, meaning that the water in the lake is usually layered but mixes over several times in the year. Aragonite, calcite, dolomite, gypsum and halite precipitate out of the water. In sediments remnants of characeae, diatoms, ostracods and Ruppia have been found; today only one ostracod species persists in the lake. Flamingos exist in the area and the lake is an important site for birds.

The watershed of Laguna del Negro Francisco covers a surface area of 930 square kilometres (360 sq mi). The Astaburuaga River is the principal inflow; other creeks that enter the lake and groundwater play only a minor role. The mean discharge of the Astaburuaga is about 0.888 cubic metres per second (31.4 cu ft/s), but it varies strongly over time, including at different hours of the day as the water of the river freezes and remelts. In addition, some water from the Astaburuaga River flows into the Cíenaga Redonda basin rather than Laguna del Negro Francisco; presently, an alluvial cone separates the Astaburuaga River in the Valle Ancho gorge from the Salar de Maricunga/ Cíenaga Redonda watershed.

The lake has no outlet and is the southernmost closed basin in Chile; however during former lake level highstands the lake overflowed at 4,236 metres (13,898 ft) into the Salar de Maricunga. The lake was once thought to be the source of the Copiapó River.

== Geology ==
Geologically, the lake is located in a 200 square kilometres (77 sq mi) north-south trending depression between the Andes in the east and the Cordillera Domeyko in the west; subduction of the Nazca Plate beneath South America is responsible for the formation of these mountain ranges. On these sides normal faults border the depression which is closed to the north and the south by the Quaternary volcanoes Copiapó and Jotabeche, respectively. Oligocene to Pliocene andesites of the Negro Francisco Formation and Quaternary sediments cover the depression, the latter especially in the east. The depression extends past these volcanoes to the Salar de Pedernales and the Salar de Maricunga;

== Climate and life ==
There is little information on the climate of the lake, but average temperatures are 1–2 °C (34–36 °F) and precipitation mostly falls during winter from cold fronts and cutoff lows, with a probably smaller amount of summer precipitation; the total amount of precipitation is about 250 millimetres per year (9.8 in/year). (Note: Between 1943 and 1945, an annual precipitation of 118 millimetres per year (4.6 in/year) was measured.) Evaporation is about six times larger than precipitation. The region is windy and is considered to be a cold desert.

Vegetation is scarce at these altitudes and is classified as steppe vegetation. Animals found in the region include guanacos, pumas, vicuñas and vizcachas, while birds include the Andean goose, three flamingo species Andean gull, Baird's sandpiper, crested duck and horned coot; in total there are about 17 bird species. The area is a protected area as part of the Nevado Tres Cruces National Park and was declared a Ramsar site in 1996, a site of international importance to waterbirds.

== Lacustrine history ==
In the past, the Astaburuaga River did flow to the Salar de Maricunga; tectonic subsidence of the Negro Francisco Basin eventually led to a river capture involving a former tributary of the Astaburuaga reversing into the Negro Francisco basin and finally capturing the Astaburuaga itself. This event is responsible for the formation of Laguna del Negro Francisco within the basin, as without the Astaburuaga's input there would not be enough water to sustain a permanent lake.

Older shorelines testify to higher water levels in the past exceeding the present-day water level by 100 metres (330 ft) (at spillover point); other shorelines are found at 1 metre (3 ft 3 in), 5 metres (16 ft) and 25 metres (82 ft) above sea level. The maximum surface area of the lake reached 78 square kilometres (30 mi^{2}). A wet period occurred in northern Chile, northwestern Argentina and the Bolivian Altiplano during the so-called "Lake Tauca phase", and in the climatically Mediterranean parts of Chile it ended together with the Pleistocene for not yet clear reasons. Underwater shorelines also exist, indicating that at times the lake level was lower than today.

During the Holocene, the lake at times turned into a salt pan which only occasionally filled with water, such as between 6,000 and 3,800 years before present. Starting 3,600 years ago, a large wet period in the region made the lake grow in size and become less saline, with brackish conditions established between 3,000 and 1,800 years ago. During this wet period, glaciers in the region expanded due to the increased availability of moisture and peat bogs formed in valleys.

After 1,800 years before present, the lake became saltier again, either because of salt accumulation or because the lake shrank; the latter possibility is more likely. More recent fluctuations have occurred as well; a dry period may be associated with the little ice age. Between 1985 and 2016, glacier coverage declined by about 32%. In 2012-2015 environmental degradation in the area has become apparent, accompanied by a shrinkage of water surfaces and dropping groundwater levels.

=== Human use ===
In prehistory, first pre-ceramic hunter-gatherers and later ceramics-using people who also engaged in horticulture were active in the area of the Astaburuaga River and the Laguna del Negro Francisco. The Inca were active in the valleys south and southwest from Laguna del Negro Francisco and also on the Copiapó and Jotabeche.

A 1921 publication mentioned a project to divert waters of the Astaburuaga River for irrigation purposes. Later, projects were devised which envisaged capturing the discharge into the lake in a canal and transfer the water through a tunnel into the Figueroa River, (one of the headwaters of the Copiapó River;) or to divert the Astaburuaga River into the Salar de Maricunga and from there into the Copiapó River catchment. In 2009, a mining company held rights to divert about 0.34 cubic metres per second (12 cu ft/s) from the Astaburuaga River. The waters of the lake itself are not suited for either drinking or irrigation purposes.
