= Pissis =

Pissis is a French surname. Notable people with the surname include:

- Albert Pissis (1852–1914), American architect
- Pedro José Amadeo Pissis (1812–1889), French geologist

== See also ==
- Monte Pissis, mountain in Argentina
- Fjortis or Pissis, Finnish slang term
