= Dvoinoye Gold Mine =

Dvoinoye mine
- Location in Chukotka
- Location: Anadyr Highlands, Chukotka Autonomous Okrug, Russia; 67°38′01″N 169°13′34″E
- Products: Gold
- Opened: 2013
- Company: Kinross Gold
- Website: www.kinross.com

The Dvoinoye Gold Mine is an underground gold mine in the Bilibinsky District of the Chukotka Autonomous Okrug of Russia. The mine is owned by Canadian mining company Kinross Gold and is approximately 100 kilometres (60 mi) from their Kupol Gold Mine. Originally the site of a surface mine, Kinross acquired the property in 2010, and built the underground mine at a cost of US$360-million. The mine began production in 2013.

== History ==
In 2010 Kinross acquired the rights to the Dvoinoye property, which is located approximately 100 kilometres (60 mi) from another Kinross mine, Kupol. The property was purchased from Northern Gold; an open pit mine previously operated on the site, producing 250 tonnes per day, six months per year. After acquisition, Kinross completed diamond drilling on the property, and a feasibility study. Production began at the mine in October 2013, and the mine was built "on time and on budget" at a cost of US$360-million.

== Operation ==
The Dvoinoye mine is expected to operate at the rate of 1000 tonnes of ore per day, which will be processed at Kupol, producing a gold and silver doré. The mine is expected to produce up to 300,000 troy ounces (9,300,000 g) of gold-equivalent per year during the first three years of production. To handle the additional ore from Dvoinoye, capacity at the mineral processing facility at Kupol was increased by an additional 1000 tonnes per day, yielding a total capacity of 4,500 tonnes per day.

== Reserves and resources ==
The Dvoinoye Gold Mine has a NI 43-101 proven and probable reserves of more than two million tonnes of gold ore, at a grade of approximately 19 grams per tonne gold and 28.5 grams per tonne silver. There is an additional 280,000 tonnes in the measured, indicated, and inferred categories, although at a lower grade.
