= Paracatu mine =

Gold mine in Minas Gerais, Brazil

Coordinates: 17.193°S 46.8804°W

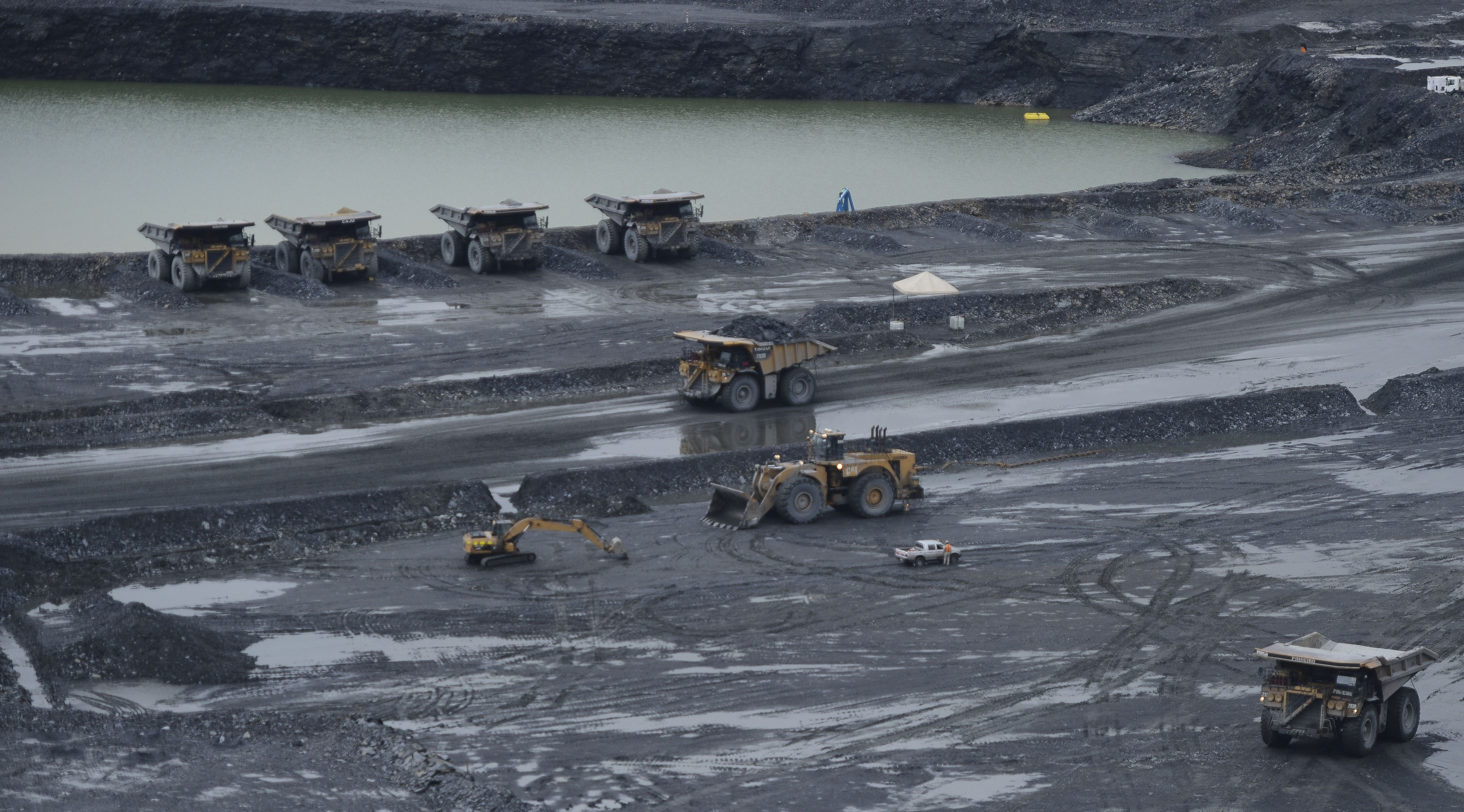

- Location within Minas Gerais Location within Brazil
- Location: Minas Gerais, Brazil
- Products: Gold
- Company: Kinross Gold

The Paracatu mine is one of the largest gold surface mines in Brazil, and also in the world.

The mine is located in Minas Gerais state, in the southcentral region of Brazil. It is owned and operated by the Canadian Kinross Gold mining company.

The mine has estimated reserves of 17.5 million oz of gold.
