= Veladero =

Coordinates: 8.2333°N 81.6500°W

- Corregimiento
- Location within Panama
- Country: Panama
- Province: Chiriquí
- District: Tolé
- Established: March 7, 1997

Area
  - Land: 51.1 km^{2} (19.7 sq mi)

Population (2010)
  - Total: 1,727
  - Density: 33.8/km^{2} (88/sq mi)
- Population density calculated based on land area.
- Time zone: UTC−5 (EST)
- Climate: Am

Veladero is a corregimiento in Tolé District, Chiriquí Province, Panama. It has a land area of 51.1 square kilometres (19.7 sq mi) and had a population of 1,727 as of 2010, giving it a population density of 33.8 inhabitants per square kilometre (88/sq mi). It was created by Law 10 of March 7, 1997; this measure was complemented by Law 5 of January 19, 1998 and Law 69 of October 28, 1998. Its population as of 2000 was 1,575.

The mountain peak Baboso is nearby.
