= Maricunga mine =

Gold mine in Atacama, Chile

Maricunga
- Location of Maricunga Maricunga mine (Chile)
- Location: Maricunga mining district, Atacama, Chile; 27°32′0″S 69°18′0″W
- Production: 156,590
- Financial year: 2010
- Opened: 2005
- Active: 2005-present
- Company: Kinross Gold
- Website: kinross.com
- Acquired: 1998 (50%); 2007 (100%)

Maricunga mine is an open pit gold mine in Chile. It is owned by Toronto-based Kinross Gold, but it has been closed since August 2016.

== Geology ==
The Maricunga mine is located within the Maricunga Gold Belt of Chile. Poyrphyry gold mineralization occurs in the early Miocene (dated to 22 to 24 million years ago) Maricunga volcanic-intrusive complex.

== Description ==
In 1998 Kinross began operating the mine following a merger with Amax Gold (which changed its name to Kinam ), which held a 50% stake in the property, with the remainder coming with the 2007 purchase of Bema Gold Corporation. In 2010 Kinross announced completion of a feasibility study for a $290 million expansion project to the Maricunga mine, which would increase production by 10 million tons, and 90,000 ounces per year. The expansion includes additions to their mobile equipment fleet, additional crushers and a 3 km (1.9 mi) long conveyor.

In August 2016, Kinross ceased operations at the Maricunga gold mine, resulting in a layoff of 300 employees. The decision to close the mine was the result of the Chilean government "shut[ing] down the water system linked to the operation over environmental concerns."
