= Lobo-Marte mine =

Gold mining project in Chile

- Location: Atacama Region, Chile
- Products: Gold
- Company: Kinross Gold

The Lobo-Marte mine is a gold mining project in Chile's Atacama Region. According to the developers of the project, if opened it would be one of the largest gold mines in Chile and in the world. The mine is located in the north of the country in the Atacama Region. The mine has estimated reserves of 9.77 million oz of gold. By one estimate the construction of the mine could start in 2025.
