= Nevado Tres Cruces National Park =

National park in the Atacama Region of Chile

- IUCN category II (national park)
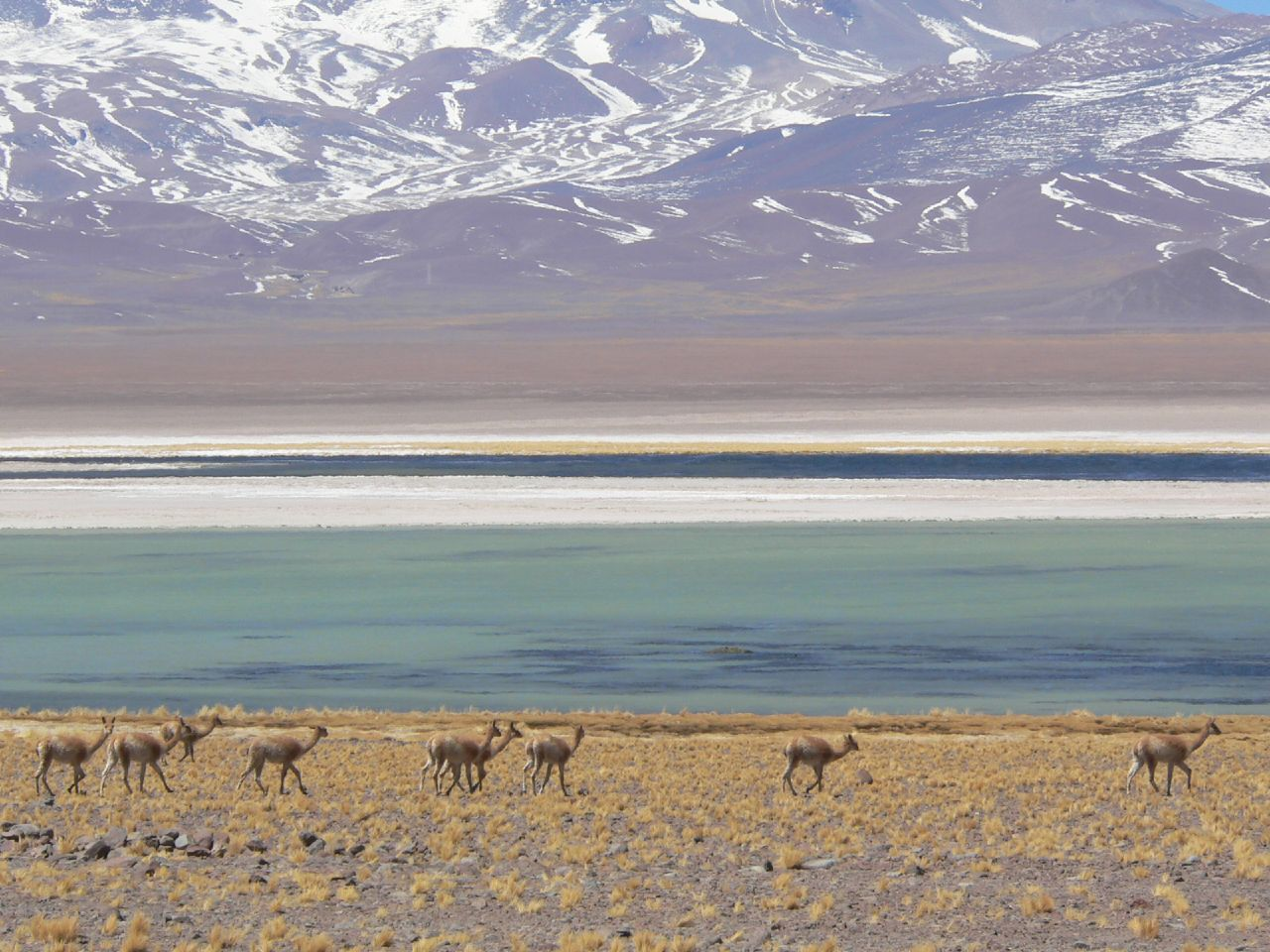
- Laguna Santa Rosa
- Interactive map of Nevado Tres Cruces National Park
- Location: Atacama Region, Chile
- Nearest city: Copiapó
- Coordinates: 27°03′22″S 69°05′32″W
- Area: 591 km^{2} (228 sq mi)
- Governing body: Corporación Nacional Forestal

Ramsar Wetland
- Official name: Complejo Lacustre Laguna del Negro Francisco y Laguna Santa Rosa
- Designated: 2 December 1996
- Reference no.: 877

Nevado Tres Cruces National Park (Spanish pronunciation: [neˈβaðo tɾes ˈkɾuses]) is a national park in the Atacama Region of Chile, east of Copiapó. It includes Laguna Santa Rosa, Laguna del Negro Francisco, and a part of the Salar de Maricunga. The park is divided into two zones, the northern zone encompassing the southern portion of Salar de Maricunga and Laguna Santa Rosa, and the southern area the Laguna del Negro Francisco. The park is named after Nevado Tres Cruces, which dominates the landscape of the area. The park is managed by the Corporación Nacional Forestal (National Forest Corporation; CONAF), which offers two refuges in the area: one at the south of Negro Francisco Lagoon and other at the west of Santa Rosa Lagoon. The park is open from October to April.

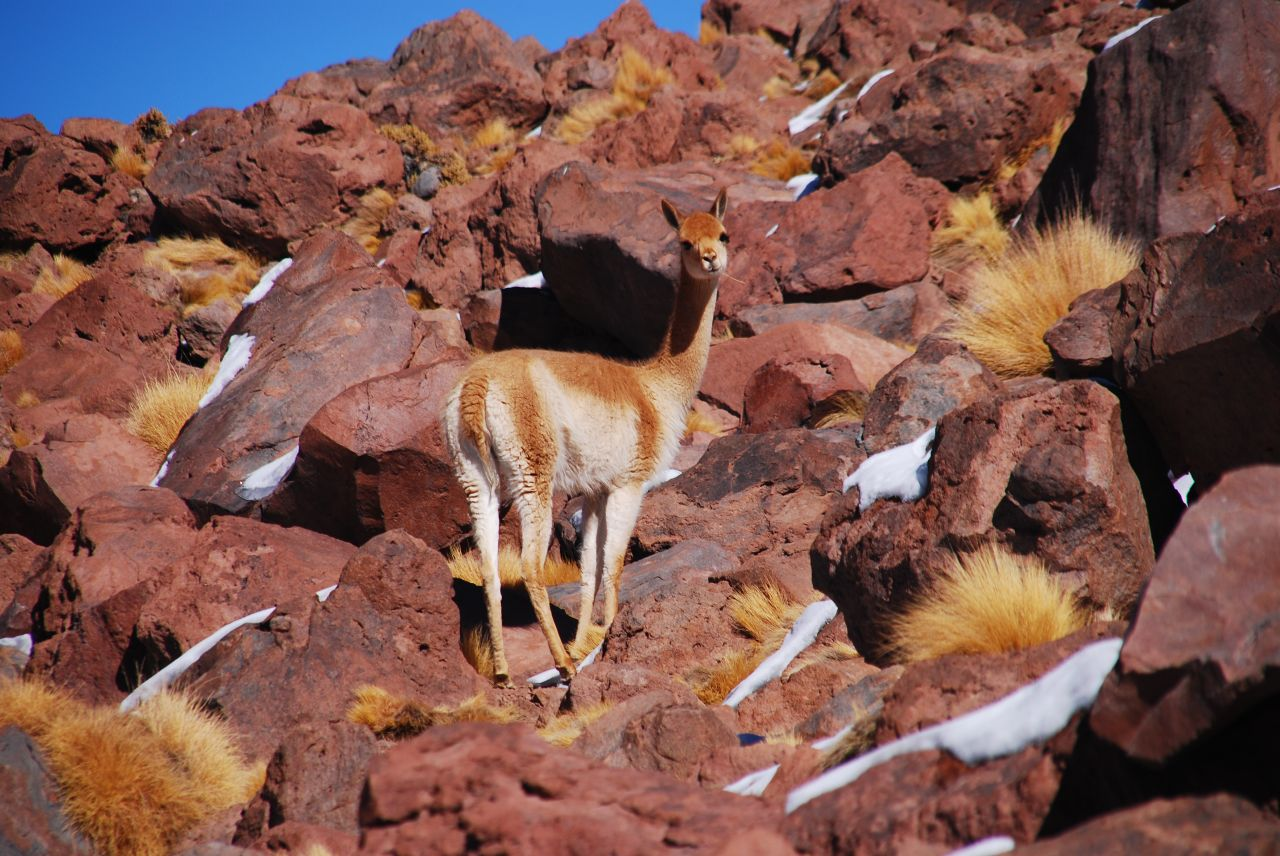
Vicuña in the Park

== Environment ==
The park lies in the northern end of the Southern Andean steppe.

== Salar de Maricunga ==
This salt flat spans 8,300 hectares at an elevation of 3,700 meters (12,100 feet). The world's highest volcano, and the highest peak in Chile, Ojos del Salado, (6,893 meters; 22,615 feet) is located in its vicinity. The salar is 180 km northeast of the city of Copiapó in the Andes mountains.

== Laguna Santa Rosa ==
Laguna Santa Rosa
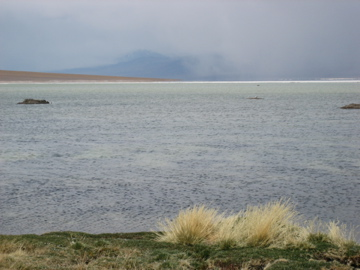

- Location within Chile
- Location: Nevado Tres Cruces National Park
- Coordinates: 27°05′10″S 69°10′15″W
- Basin countries: Chile

Located just south of the Salar de Maricunga, the lagoon is known for its Andean flamingos, which reside on the lagoon year-round. Laguna Santa Rosa, along with Laguna del Negro Francisco, is a Wetland of International Importance under the Ramsar Convention.

== Laguna del Negro Francisco ==
Located 210 km northeast of Copiapó at 4,126 meters (13,537 feet) above sea level, the lagoon is encircled by the foothills of the Andes. It offers a view toward Copiapó volcano. As a nationally protected area, there is an abundance of fauna, such as flamingoes and vicuñas.

== See also ==
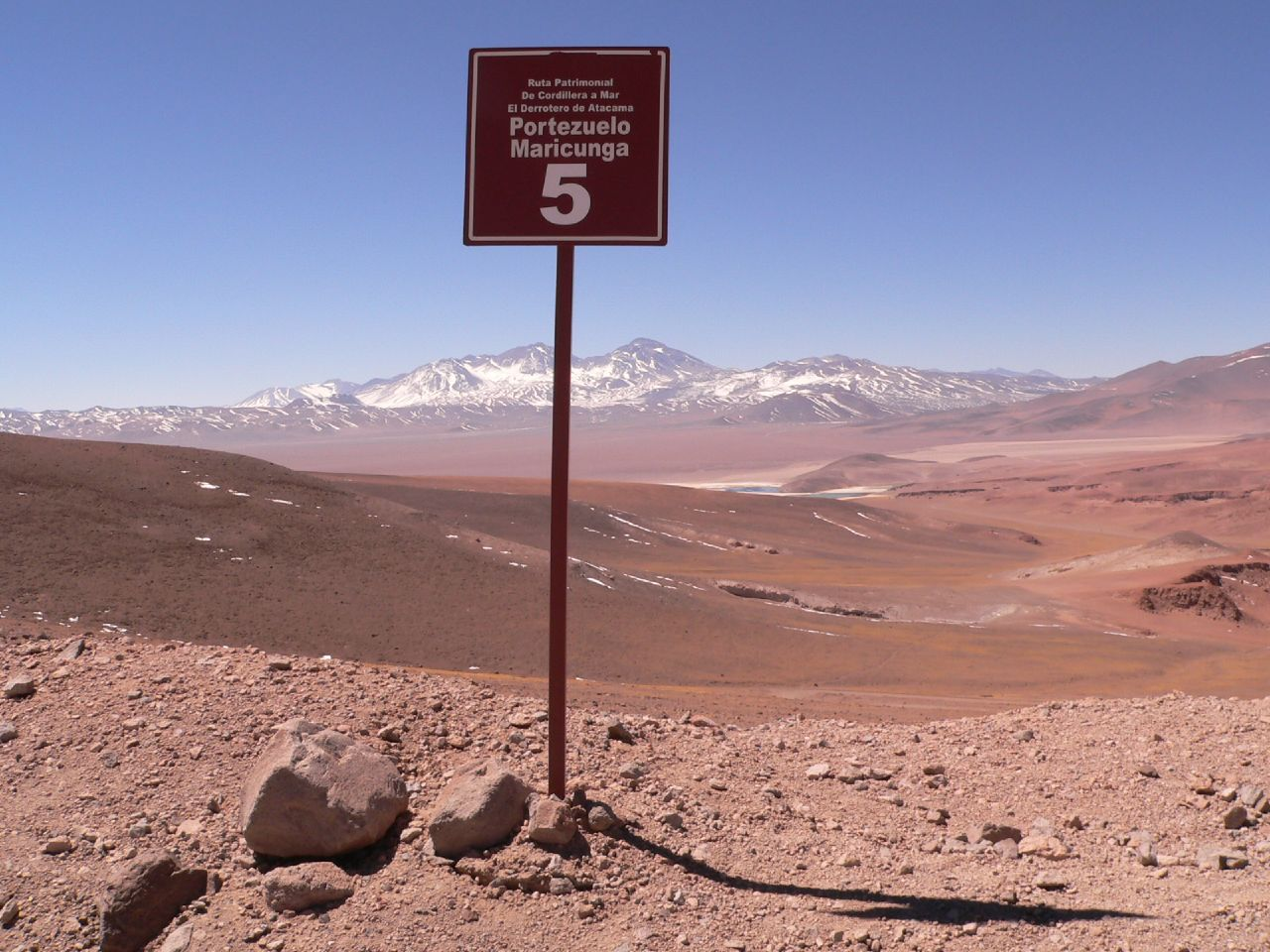
Nevado Tres Cruces

- Laguna Verde
