= Kinross Gold =

Canadian-based gold and silver mining company

Kinross Gold Corporation
- Type: Public
- Traded as: TSX: K NYSE: KGC
- Industry: Metals and Mining
- Founded: 1993
- Founder: Robert Buchan
- Headquarters: Toronto, Ontario
- Key people: Esteban Rodriguez Jr., CEO
- Products: Gold, Silver
- Revenue: ▼US$3.279 billion (2021)</ref=name>
- Operating income: ▼US$464 million (2021)
- Net income: ▼US$221 million (2021)
- Website: www.kinross.com

Kinross Gold Corporation is a Canadian gold and silver mining company founded in 1993 and headquartered in Toronto, Ontario, Canada. Kinross currently operates six active gold mines, and was ranked fifth of the "10 Top Gold-mining Companies" of 2019 by InvestingNews. The company's mines are located in Brazil, Mauritania, and the United States. It trades under the KGC ticker in the New York Stock Exchange, and under K in the Toronto Stock Exchange.

== Operations ==
Kinross Gold operates mines in the United States, Brazil, Mauritania and Chile. In 2025 it produced 2,012,106 attributable gold equivalent ounces. For 2026 it expects approximately 2.0 million ounces (±5%), of which about 75% is forecast to come from the Americas (United States 34%, Brazil 30%, Chile 11%) and 25% from Mauritania. With its second-quarter 2026 results, in which it produced 492,326 gold equivalent ounces, the company said it remained on track to meet its 2026 guidance.

Asset	Country	Kinross stake	Type of mine	Gold equivalent production, 2025	Gold reserves, December 31, 2025
Fort Knox Gold Mine (including Manh Choh)	United States	100% (Manh Choh: 70%)	open-pit mine	410,822 oz	976 koz (plus 444 koz at Manh Choh, Kinross's 70% share)
Round Mountain Gold Mine	United States	100%	open-pit mine	143,402 oz	1,888 koz
Bald Mountain mine	United States	100%	open-pit mine	179,169 oz	1,225 koz
Paracatu mine	Brazil	100%	open-pit mine	601,318 oz	4,839 koz
Tasiast Gold Mine	Mauritania	100%	open-pit mine	503,429 oz	4,401 koz
La Coipa	Chile	100% (Puren deposit: 65%)	open-pit mine	231,770 oz	436 koz (plus 10,839 koz of silver)

Production figures are on a 100% basis; Kinross's 2025 attributable production at Fort Knox, which includes only its 70% share of Manh Choh, was 353,018 gold equivalent ounces.

=== Fort Knox ===
This property includes a mill, tailings storage, heap leach facility, the Gil project, and the True North open pit mine, which is closed and under monitoring. Expected to run out of ore in 2021, the mine's life was extended to 2030 following a $100 million expansion investment announced in 2018, increasing life-of-mine production by about 1.5 million gold equivalent ounces. The Fort Knox segment also includes Manh Choh, a mine in which Kinross holds a 70% interest and which came online in 2024, contributing higher-grade ore to the Fort Knox mill. In 2025 the segment produced 410,822 gold equivalent ounces, up from 377,258 in 2024, reflecting a full year of production from Manh Choh.

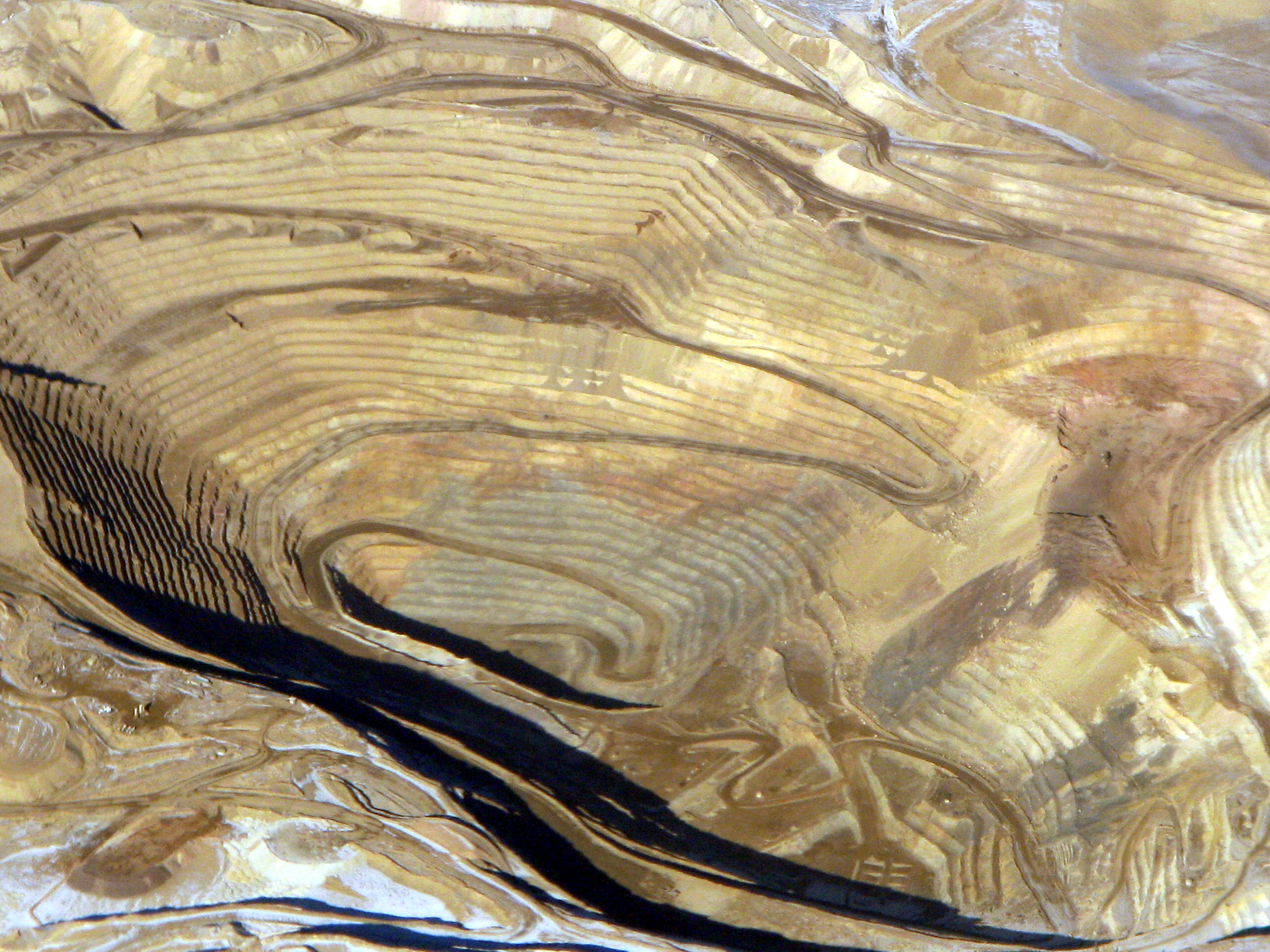
Round Mountain Gold Mine

=== Round Mountain ===
The Round Mountain Gold Mine is located in Nye County, Nevada. Kinross acquired its initial 50% interest in 2003 through its acquisition of Echo Bay Mines, and purchased the remaining 50% from Barrick Gold on January 11, 2016, together with the Bald Mountain mine, for US$610 million in cash. Production fell to 143,402 gold equivalent ounces in 2025 from 215,387 in 2024 as the site transitioned from Phase W to Phase S ore under the planned mine sequence. In January 2026 Kinross approved construction of the Phase X underground project, which is expected to extend the mine's life by eight years to 2038.

=== Bald Mountain ===
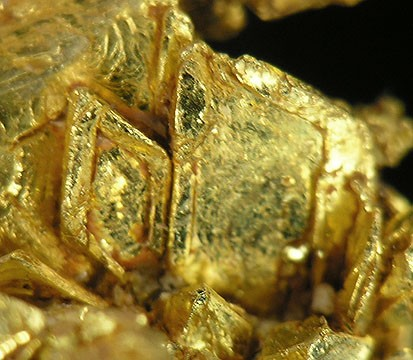
Gold from the Round Mountain Mine

Located in White Pine County, Nevada, the Bald Mountain mine is operated by subsidiary KG Mining (Bald Mountain) Inc. Kinross acquired the mine from Barrick in January 2016. It produced 179,169 gold equivalent ounces in 2025, in line with 2024, and in January 2026 Kinross approved construction of the Redbird 2 project there.

=== Paracatu ===
The open-pit Paracatu gold mine, located in northwest Minas Gerais, Brazil. Paracatu is Kinross's largest producing mine: it produced 601,318 gold equivalent ounces in 2025, up from 528,574 in 2024, and was above 500,000 ounces for an eighth consecutive year. It had proven and probable reserves of 4,839,000 ounces of gold at the end of 2025.

=== Tasiast ===
Kinross acquired the Tasiast mine (located in Mauritania) in 2010, expanding the operation twice by 2017. Mill expansions to 21,000 and then 24,000 tonnes per day were later completed. Tasiast produced 503,429 gold equivalent ounces in 2025, down from 622,394 in 2024 because of planned lower grades, and was Kinross's highest-margin operation. A five-year collective labour agreement was finalized at the mine in the fourth quarter of 2025, and 2026 production is guided at about 505,000 ounces.

In 2012, securities class action lawsuits launched in the U.S. and Canada, alleging Kinross Gold overstated the value of Tasiast mine in its financial statements, misrepresented some of the mine's project expansion schedules, and made other false statements. In 2015, the parties reached no-fault settlement agreements which included payments by Kinross totaling approximately $US 40 million.

In June 2016, due to "government allegations of invalid work permits" for expatriate employees, the mine suspended operations, resuming them in August that same year.

In May 2020, there was a short strike by unionized employees at the mine, which was suspended at the request of the Mauritanian government. A month later, Kinross reached an agreement in principle with the government, which included revalued royalties.

=== La Coipa ===
La Coipa is a gold and silver mine in Chile that Kinross restarted as part of its grade enhancement strategy. In 2025 it produced 231,770 gold equivalent ounces, down from 246,131 in 2024 under the planned mine sequence, and about 210,000 ounces are guided for 2026. At the end of 2025 it had proven and probable reserves of 436,000 ounces of gold and 10,839,000 ounces of silver, and Kinross is progressing permitting work for mine life extensions.

=== Former operations ===
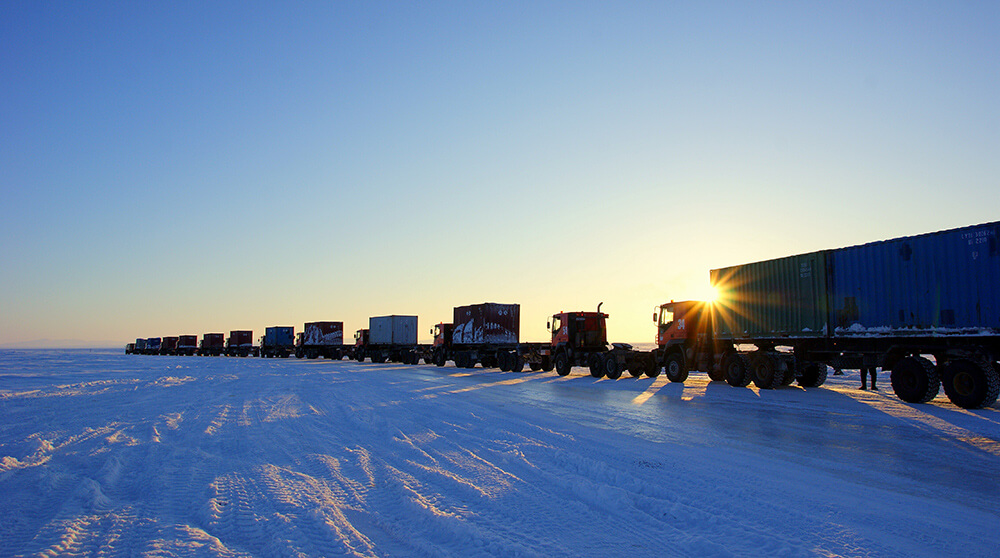
Trucks on ice road to Kupol mine in Russia, 2013.

Kinross completed the sale of its Russian assets, including the Kupol mine, to Highland Gold in June 2022. Kinross held a 90% interest in the Chirano gold mine in Ghana, with a 10% carried interest held by the Government of Ghana. It completed the sale of its interest to Asante Gold Corp. on August 10, 2022, for total consideration of US$225 million in cash and shares.

=== Development projects ===
In January 2026 Kinross announced construction decisions for the Round Mountain Phase X underground project, the Curlew project and the Bald Mountain Redbird 2 project. Together they are expected to contribute 3 million ounces of production from 2028 and extend mine lives into the 2030s.

At the Great Bear project in Ontario, Kinross is advancing permitting and detailed engineering, with first gold production targeted for late 2029. At the Lobo-Marte project in Chile, which had proven and probable reserves of 6,733,000 ounces of gold at the end of 2025, Kinross said in February 2026 that it planned to submit its Environmental Impact Assessment by the second quarter of 2026, and it sees the project contributing to production in the early 2030s.

== History ==
=== Founding and early years ===
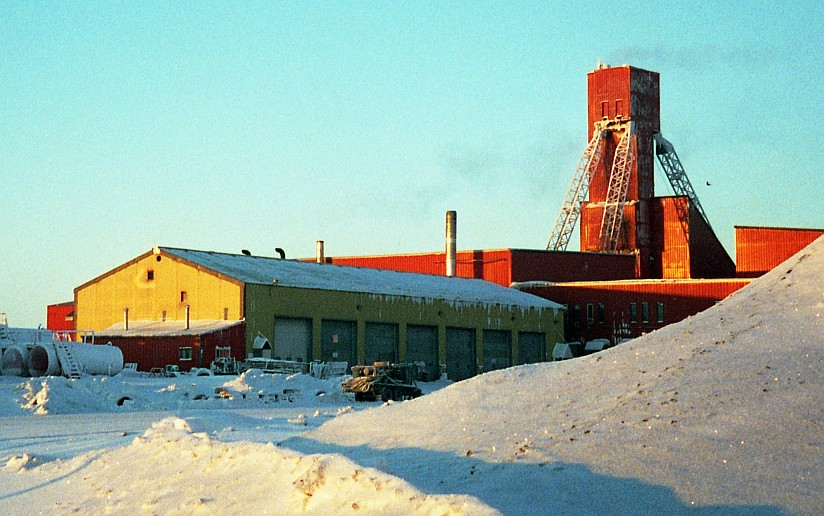
Kinross' merger with Echo Bay Mines resulted in ownership of Lupin Mine, which was sold in 2006.

Kinross Gold Corporation was founded in 1993, following the amalgamation of three companies: Plexus Resources Corporation, CMP Resources and numbered company 1021105 Ontario Corp., resulting in the new company owning a stake and royalties in a mining property in Fallon, Nevada and the QR Mine in British Columbia. On June 1, 1993, Kinross was listed on the Toronto Stock Exchange and NASDAQ, then on the New York Stock Exchange in 1994.

Kinross' first project – now operated by its subsidiary Fairbanks Gold Mining – was the Fort Knox Gold Mine, an open-pit mining operation in Alaska. The area, including surrounding deposits, was prospected as early as 1913, but no mining took place until 1996. The mine currently produces over 200,000 ounces of gold a year.

In 1998, a wholly owned subsidiary of Kinross merged with Amax Gold, forming Kinam Gold, the company's largest subsidiary. effectively transferring ownership of the mine back to Kinross, along with Maricunga Gold Mine in Chile, as part of the merger.

=== 1999–2006 ===
Kinross acquired Hollinger Mines in 1999 as part of a land package prior to the bankruptcy of Royal Oak Mines (later sold to Goldcorp in 2006). Also that year, Kinross acquired LA Teko Resources Ltd. through its wholly owned subsidiary, LT Acquisition Inc. division.

In July 2002, Kinross and Placer Dome combined their assets in Timmins, Ontario and formed the Porcupine Joint Venture (51% Placer Dome, 49% Kinross). In January 2003 Kinross TVX Gold and Echo Bay Mines shareholders approved a $3-billion merger, combining the three companies, while retaining the name Kinross Gold. The TVX merger resulted in Kinross' stake in the La Coipa open pit mine, the remainder being purchased from Goldcorp in 2007.

In 2006, Kinross bought Crown Resources Corporation, which gave it ownership of the mineral resource Buckhorn Mountain (later Buckhorn Gold Mine) and the associated mineral processing facilities.

=== 2007–present ===
In 2007, Kinross traded assets with Goldcorp; Kinross received $200 million and the remaining portion of the La Coipa Gold Mine it had acquired with the TVX merger, in exchange for giving up its 49% of the Porcupine Joint Venture and 31.9% of the Musselwhite mine.

In 2010, Kinross purchased 91% of Red Back Mining for $7.1 billion. The purchase brought with it the two gold mines in Africa (Chirano and Tasiast). Also that year, Kinross acquired the Dvoinoye deposit and the property in Vodorazdelnaya, about 90 kilometres (56 mi) north of Kinross’ Kupol operation. In 2011, Kinross entered into a share purchase agreement with the State Unitary Enterprise of the Chukotka Autonomous Okrug, whereby it held 100% of the Kupol mine and exploration licenses. Kinross sold its interest in the Crixás mine to AngloGold Ashanti in 2012.

In December 2017, Kinross acquired mineral rights to Gilmore, or Parcel G, a 709-acre tract adjacent to its Fort Knox Gold Mine, about 25 miles northeast of Fairbanks, Alaska. Estimates of the land valued it as containing 2.1 million ounces of gold.

In December 2021, Kinross offered to acquire Great Bear Resources for $29 per share, or about $1.8 billion, giving it ownership of a gold mining prospect in Red Lake, Ontario, Canada. Kinross shares dropped 9% after it announced the buyout bid. The deal to acquire Great Bear closed on February 24, 2022.

== Non-operating, discontinued and divested mines ==
- Julietta Mine is a gold and silver mine located in the Omsukchansky District of Magadan Oblast, near Russia's far eastern border.
- Kettle River-Buckhorn - the Washington-state based mine and mill were acquired by Kinross in 2006, and was closed in 2017.
- Mineral Hill - located on the east side of Crevice Mountain, Montana, Mineral Hill operated from 1990 to 1996. In 2017, Kinross donated water rights representing 3 billion gallons of water to Trout Unlimited to protect fish habitat in tributaries of the Yellowstone River.
- Cerro Casale - Chile-based mine acquired by Kinross in 2007. As of 2015, the mine was inactive, and Kinross divested in 2017.
- Crixás - Kinross sold its 50% interest in the Brazil-based mine to AngloGold Ashanti for $220 million.
- Fruta del Norte - Kinross purchased 100% of outstanding shares in the Ecuadorian deposit in 2008, but ceased development in 2013, and sold the rights in 2014.
- La Coipa - Kinross incurred an impairment charge of $124 million in 2014 after development on the Chile-based mine ceased. In February 2020, Kinross announced it was proceeding with the La Coipa Restart project to mine the Phase 7 deposit, expected to operate from 2022 to 2024.
- Lobo-Marte - After acquiring 40% interest in the Chile mine in 2008, Kinross acquired the remaining interest in 2009, for a total cost of $182 million. The results of a pre-feasibility study at Lobo-Marte was announced in July 2020. Subject to development decision, project construction will begin in 2025, with production expected in 2027.
- Maricunga - Operations ceased in August 2016, after the Chilean government shut off the mine's water supply over environmental concerns. As a result, 300 employees were laid off, and Kinross incurred an impairment charge of $68 million.
- Dvoinoye Gold Mine & Kupol Gold Mine - The Dvoinoye and Kupol gold mines are located in Russia approximately 100 kilometres (60 mi) apart; Dvoinoye is an underground mine, while Kupol is a combination of open-pit and underground. Acquired in 2010 and opened in 2013, Dvionoye/Kupol was one of Kinross' most profitable segments. In April 2022, Kinross announced that it was selling 100% of its Russian assets to the Highland Gold Mining, completing the sale of Russian assets two months later.

== Financial performance ==
=== Gold production ===
Annual gold production (thousands of ounces) was:

- 2013 - 2,631
- 2014 - 2,710
- 2015 - 2,594
- 2016 - 2,789
- 2017 - 2,673
- 2018 - 2,450
- 2019 - 2,507
- 2020 - 2,366
- 2021 - 2,063

=== Gold reserves ===
Kinross' proven and probable gold reserves were 32.6 million ounces as of December 31, 2021.

=== Assets ===
Kinross Gold's total assets decreased significantly in recent years, from $US 16.39 billion in 2010 to $US 7.73 billion in 2015.

=== Other ===
Kinross suspended dividend payments in 2013. It started paying again in 2020, and that year, also announced a share buyback program.

In 2015 in the wake of declining gold prices, Kinross closed their office in Denver and eliminated 110 corporate positions in Denver, Chile, Spain, and Toronto.

In 2016, Standard & Poor's lowered Kinross' credit rating to junk bond status, largely based on the share of their production that came from mines in Russia, which the agency saw as a significant risk.

In 2017, Moody's Investors Service assigned a Ba1 rating to Kinross, "primarily driven by the company's good scale (2.78 million gold-equivalent ounces (GEO) as of March 2017 LTM), low leverage (1.7x LTM adjusted Debt/EBITDA), and very good liquidity (SGL-1).

On March 2, 2020, Moody's announced it had upgraded Kinross's credit rating to investment grade. Their senior unsecured notes rating was upgraded to Ba1, with a stable outlook. Kinross currently holds investment grade ratings from Moody's, S&P Global Ratings, and Fitch Ratings.

== Corporate responsibility ==
In 2015, Kinross achieved an A− ranking in Maclean's magazine's annual assessment of socially responsible companies, the highest ranking of any Canadian mining company.

For Kinross' cooperation with an environmental group in Washington state, and for five out of eight mines being in compliance with the International Cyanide Management Code (as of May 2013, the Company had eight of its nine mines in compliance with the International Cyanide Management Code), Kinross was recognized as one of Canada's Top 50 Most Responsible Corporations by Maclean's magazine and Jantzi Research in 2009.

Through a $1 million donation by Kinross in 2010, the University of Guelph created a new chair as part of its BetterPlanet Project. Said Chair is named the Kinross Chair in Environmental Governance, and is held by a "succession of experts". Also with the university, Kinross provided $100 thousand towards its Fight Against Hunger.

In 2010, Kinross committed to contribute $10 million over a three-year period towards developing a mining school in Mauritania. The following year, it committed $2.5 million to build and equip a medical emergency centre in that country.

In 2013, Kinross was named to the Dow Jones Sustainability World Index for the third consecutive year, as well as the DJSI North American Index, the Ethibel Excellence Investment Register, and the Ethical Global Equity and ECPI Global Carbon Indices. For the fifth consecutive year, the company was named to the Jantzi Social Index, and as one of Canada's Best 50 Corporate Citizens by Corporate Knights magazine for the fourth year.

In 2021, Kinross was ranked no. 22 out of 120 oil, gas, and mining companies involved in resource extraction north of the Arctic Circle in the Arctic Environmental Responsibility Index (AERI).

=== Carbon footprint ===
Kinross Gold reported Total CO2e emissions (Direct + Indirect) for the twelve months ending 31 December 2020 at 1,631 Kt (+19/+1.2% y-o-y). There have been not any significant reductions in emissions in recent years. In May 2021, Kinross committed to reaching net-zero greenhouse gas emissions by 2050.

Kinross Gold's annual Total CO2e emissions (Direct + Indirect) (in kilotonnes)
Dec 2016	Dec 2017	Dec 2018	Dec 2019	Dec 2020
1,568	1,518	1,641	1,612	1,631

== See also ==
- Gold as an investment
