= Tasiast Gold Mine =

Mauritanian open-pit gold mine

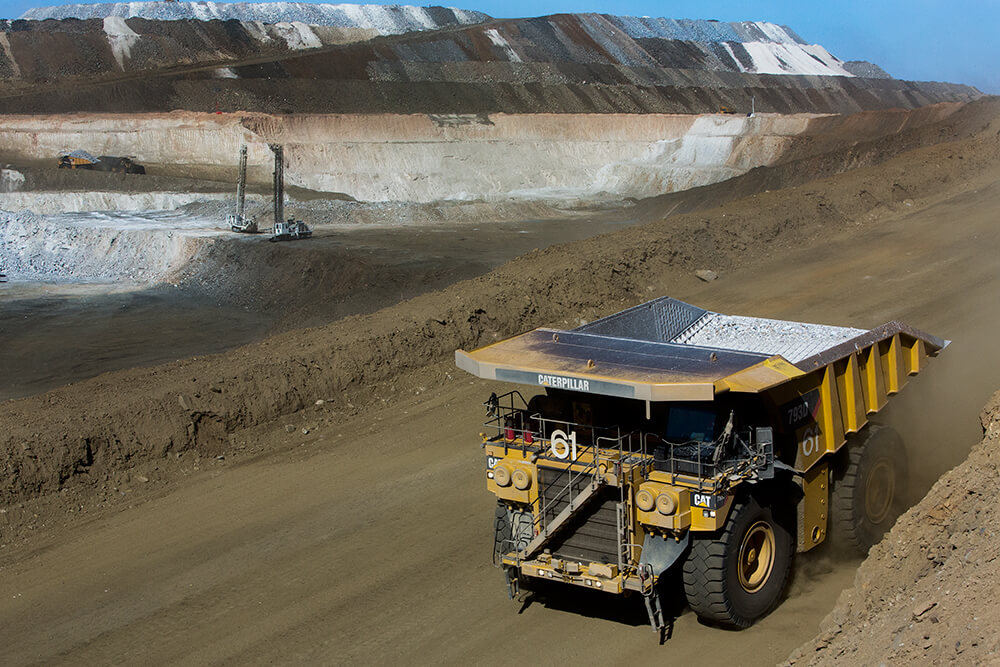
- Truck in Tasiast gold mine

- Location of Tasiast Gold Mine
- Location: Inchiri, Mauritania; 20°35′0″N 15°30′0″W
- Production: 56,611
- Financial year: 2010
- Opened: 2008
- Active: 2008-present
- Company: Kinross Gold
- Website: kinross.com
- Acquired: 2010

The Tasiast gold mine is a gold deposit located in central western Mauritania, near the coast. The operating licence was granted to Tasiast Mauritanie Limited S.A. (TMLSA), a subsidiary of the Canadian group Kinross Gold Corporation. Mining activities began in 2007.

The mine is located in the Inchiri and Dakhlet Nouadhibou regions, 250 kilometres (160 mi) south-west of Nouadhibou and 300 kilometres (190 mi) north of Nouakchott. In 2022, the mine produced 538,591 ounces of gold (15.2 tonnes). Tasiast is an open-pit mine. Gold is extracted using conventional methods, and processed by crushing, grinding and leaching with cyanide.

== History ==
Red Back Mining, a Canadian company, started operating the mine in 2007. Three years later, in August 2010, it was acquired by Kinross Gold - a Canadian mining company specializing in gold and silver deposits - for $7.1-billion.

As part of a "Mauritanization" plan for the country's economy - nationalisation in the Mauritanian context -, Kinross Gold and the government signed an agreement in 2016 to increase the proportion of Mauritanian employees in the workforce. This agreement gave rise to a major skills transfer program as well as the nationalisation of its workforce.

In January 2019, Kinross appointed a new team to run its mauritanian branch, Tasiast mauritanie Ltd SA (TMLSA). The appointments are part of a drive to "Mauritanize" the company's workforce, to increase the percentage of full time employed Mauritanians from 91% to 95.5% between 2017 and 2019. Brahim Ould M'Bareck Ould Mohamed El Moctar, former minister of rural development, agriculture, then water and sanitation, and former CEO of SNIM, was promoted to vice president of Kinross, in charge of external relations. Taleb Abdivall, former Managing Director of SOMELEC and SNIM, and Minister of Petroleum, Energy and Mines, was promoted to Non-Executive Director of TMLSA. Ousmane Kane, former Managing Director of SNIM, former Governor of the Central Bank of Mauritania and Minister of Finance, was promoted to Non-Executive Director of TMLSA.

After lengthy negotiations with the government of Mauritania, new agreements were signed in 2020 and 2021, to increase the royalty rate paid by the company to the government based on changes in the price of gold.

In 2021, a fire impacted the mine, leading to the suspension of crushing operations.

== Production ==
In 2015, production amounted to 219,045 ounces, or 6.2 tonnes of gold.

In 2016, Tasiast employed more than 4,000 people working for Kinross or its subcontractors.

In 2018, a mine expansion project was presented. It consists of two phases aiming at making it one of the largest gold mines in Africa. Phase one of the expansion project plans to increase the plant's processing capacity from 8,000 to 12,000 tonnes of ore per day. The plant was scheduled to be operational in June 2018. Phase two of the project plans to increase processing capacity to 24,000 tonnes per day by the end of 2023. The total investment for this project is close to one billion dollars.

Between 2021 and 2022, the mine's production tripled from 170,502 ounces to 538,591 ounces (or 15.2 tonnes of gold).

== Other projects ==
In 2010, Kinross plans to build training facilities in the area, including a School of Mines.

In 2019, Kinross announced its commitment to a $300 million fundraising campaign to build new on-site infrastructures at the Tasiast mine. The project includes the construction of a photovoltaic solar power plant. The plant aims to produce 34 MWh of electricity, or 20% of the plant's energy consumption.

Kinross, renowned for its social responsibility initiatives, has also developed major programs, including the donation of medical equipment to forty hospitals and health care units throughout the country.

== Controversies ==
In 2015, the company came under fire in the Mauritanian media for allegedly favoring contractors tied to the government; Kinross Gold denied the allegations.
