= Jantzi Social Index =

Canadian stock market index

The Jantzi Social Index is a Canadian stock market index created in 2000. It is based on a modified S&P/TSX Composite Index with the purpose being to measure the effect of a socially and environmentally conscious stock market index on market behavior.
