= Pedro José Amadeo Pissis =

French geologist

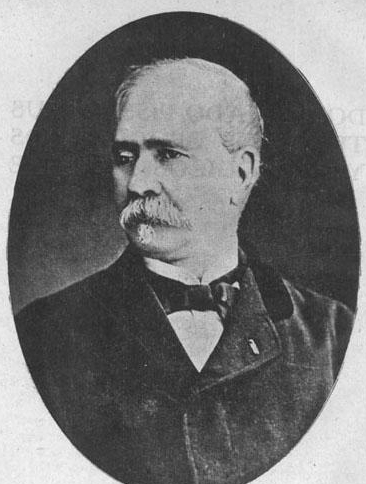
- Pissis in 1880
- Born: Pedro José Amadeo Pissis; 17 May 1812; Brioude, France
- Died: 21 January 1889 (aged 76); Santiago de Chile
- Occupation: Geologist
- Known for: Cartography of Chile

Pedro José Amadeo Pissis Marín (Brioude, France, May 17, 1812 – January 21, 1889, Santiago de Chile) was a French geologist who served the Chilean government in the 19th century. He played an influential role in the cartography of Chile. Pissis worked in Brazil and Bolivia before he arrived to Chile. He left Bolivia due to political problems and was preparing his departure to France in Valparaíso when Chilean minister Manuel Camilo Vial contacted him to do a geologic and mineralogic description of the Republic of Chile. Monte Pissis, the third highest mountain in the Western Hemisphere and second highest volcano in the world is named after him.

Pissis's map of the central region of Chile

== Sources ==
- Memoria Chilena
- Media related to Pedro José Amadeo Pissis at Wikimedia Commons
