= Monte Pissis =

Mountain in Argentina

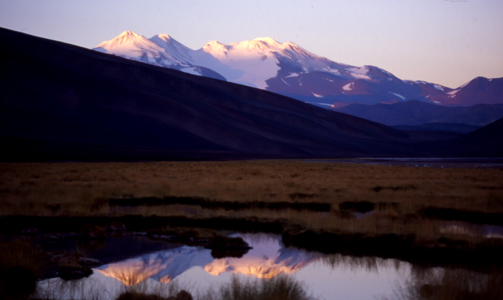
- Monte Pissis from the northeast

Highest point
- Elevation: 6,792 m (22,283 ft)
- Prominence: 2,145 m (7,037 ft) (Note: The prominence value given here is based on an elevation of 6,795 m (22,293 ft))
- Listing: Seven Third Summits; Ultra
- Coordinates: 27°45′19″S 68°47′57″W

Geography
- Location within Argentina
- Location: La Rioja and Catamarca provinces, Argentina
- Parent range: Andes

Geology
- Mountain type: Stratovolcano

Climbing
- First ascent: 1937 by Osiecki and Jan Alfred Szczepański
- Easiest route: Hike, east side

Monte Pissis is an extinct volcano on the border of the La Rioja and Catamarca provinces in Argentina, 25 km (16 mi) to the east of the Chilean border and about 550 km (340 mi) north of Aconcagua. The mountain is the second-tallest volcano in the world and the third-highest mountain in the Western Hemisphere. Monte Pissis is named after Pedro José Amadeo Pissis, a French geologist who worked for the Chilean government. Due to its location in the Atacama Desert, the mountain has very dry conditions but features an extensive glacier, with crevasses, which is unique in the region. The peak is the highest summit on Earth without a permanent glacier.

== Elevation ==
A 1994 Argentine expedition claimed —using GPS technology available at the time— that the elevation of Monte Pissis was 6,882 m (22,579 ft), higher than Ojos del Salado. Ten years later, with the use of higher precision systems, several other surveys proved that those measurements were inaccurate: in 2005, an Austrian team performed a DGPS survey of Pissis' summit and found the elevation to be 6,793 m (22,287 ft). In 2006 an international expedition surveyed the height on the summit, and found results in agreement with an elevation around 6,800 m (22,300 ft). This was later confirmed by a 2007 Chilean-Argentine-European expedition, which surveyed both Ojos del Salado and Monte Pissis and provisionally found the former to be 6,891 m (22,608 ft) and the latter 6,793 m (22,287 ft).

== Geology ==
Monte Pissis is a large andesitic-dacitic volcanic centre. It was formed between 6.6 and 6.2 million years ago. Like Cerro Bonete Chico it is one of the large volcanic complexes formed at that time over a deforming Nazca slab. Volcanism in the area ceased about 2 million years ago.

Monte Pissis, Cerro Bonete Chico and Incapillo form a large volcanic complex that is among the highest in the world. Incapillo formed after Monte Pissis had ceased erupting, and hydrothermal activity at Incapillo may continue to this day.

== Climbing ==
Until recently, this mountain had received very little attention. The first successful recorded ascent was made in 1937 by Polish climbers Stefan Osiecki and Jan Alfred Szczepański of the Second Polish Andean Expedition. The mountain was not climbed again until 1985.

The advent of mining in the area has resulted in the construction of basic roads in the last 15 years. This has helped tourism to develop in the Atacama Desert, and now more people ascend the mountain, usually with a previous stop in Fiambalá to organise the climb. Approaching it from neighbouring Chile is also possible but involves a longer route.

As the mountain is very high and remote, a long approach is required but the ascent is easy and does not require any specific climbing skill. Nevertheless, warm clothing and good shoes are essential, as the temperature during the night can drop as low as −30 °C (−22 °F) and winds can be very strong. Usually most teams ascend the peak during December to March, the warmest period of the year.

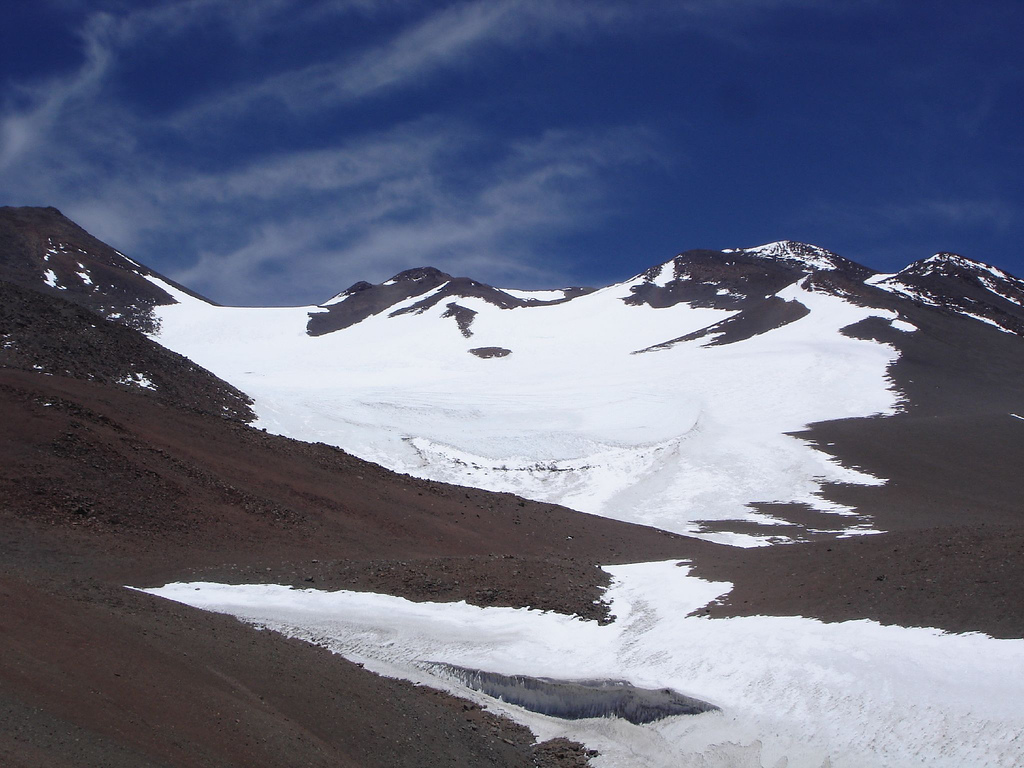
Main glacier on Monte Pissis

The peak is one of the most heavily glaciated peaks in the Atacama Desert, although the glaciated area starts only at 5,900 m (19,400 ft), and the size of the glacier is small compared to the overall surface of the mountain.

From the base of the mountain at 4,500 m (14,800 ft), several days of hiking are required. The summit is usually reached directly from a high camp at 5,900 m (19,400 ft) at the edge of the glacier.

== See also ==
- Incapillo
- Volcanic Seven Summits
- List of Ultras of South America

== Bibliography ==
- Darack, Ed (2001). Wild Winds: Adventures in the Highest Andes. Cordee / DPP. ISBN 978-1884980817.
