= Cerro Bonete =

Mountain in Argentina

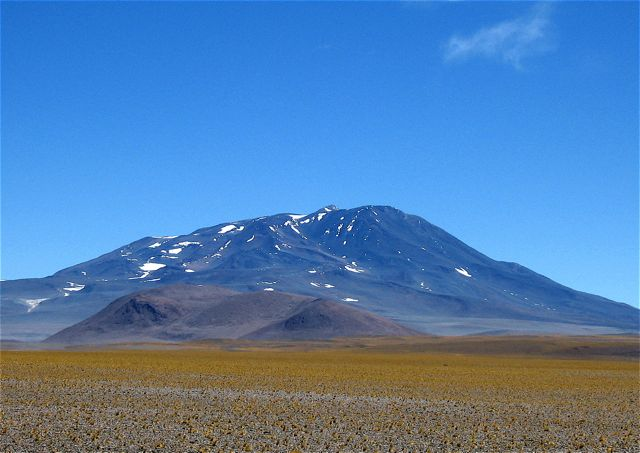
- Bonete from the south.

Highest point
- Elevation: 6,759 m (22,175 ft)
- Prominence: 1,480 m (4,860 ft)
- Coordinates: 28°01′07″S 68°45′22″W

Geography
- Location: La Rioja, Argentina
- Parent range: Andes

Cerro Bonete is a mountain in the north of the province of La Rioja, Argentina, near the provincial border with Catamarca.

Its summit is 6,759 m above mean sea level, making it the fifth-highest separate mountain in the Americas (after Aconcagua, Ojos del Salado, Monte Pissis, and Huascaran). SRTM data disproves the frequently-made claim that its summit is 6,872 m above sea level.

Within the last 3.5 million years, volcanic activity at Cerro Bonete has formed lava domes of dacite and rhyodacite.

== See also ==
- Incapillo
