= Jan Alfred Szczepański =

Polish journalist

Jan Alfred Szczepański (9 November 1902 – 20 March 1991) was a Polish journalist, theatre critic and mountaineer.

He participated in the Second Polish Andean Expedition in 1936-37.
