= Red Back Mining =

Red Back Mining Inc.
- Company type: private
- Industry: Mining
- Founded: 1988
- Founder: Lukas H Lundin
- Headquarters: Vancouver, Canada
- Key people: Lukas H Lundin Chair; Richard Clark Pres & CEO, Dir; Simon Jackson VP
- Products: Gold, Nickel, Niobium, Tantalum
- Revenue: ▲$318.39 million (2009)
- Net income: ▲$109.16 million (2009)
- Total assets: ▲$961.13 million
- Total equity: ▲$847.37 million (2009)
- Number of employees: 785 (2009)
- Parent: Kinross Gold
- Divisions: Red Back Mining NL
- Website: www.redbackmining.com

Red Back Mining Inc. is an unhedged Vancouver based mineral resource company. Its focus is West Africa where it operates the Chirano Gold Project in Ghana and the Tasiast Gold Mine in Mauritania. It has one division, Red Back Mining NL, based in Perth, Australia. While independent it was considered one of Canada's Largest gold companies with a market capitalization of $ 5.8 billion or 3/4 as much as the 10th largest gold mining company in the world however at the time its key mines hadn't yet reached full potential or critical mass.

In May 2010, there was an announcement of a private placement in which one of the world's largest gold mining companies Kinross Gold will purchase 9.4% of Red Back's outstanding shares. When the deal is completed Kinross will be the company's largest shareholder next to Fidelity Management which currently owns 6%.

On August 3, 2010 an announcement was made by Kinross offering to merge Red Back into Kinross with Kinross paying $7.1 billion for all outstanding shares of Red Back. The price offered was 15% above the current price of Red Back stock. According to Tye W. Burt, Kinross’s President, Red Back has reserves Kinross has the ability to develop.

On September 15, 2010 two thirds of Kinross Gold's shareholders voted in favour of the USD 7.2 billion deal to acquire Red Back Mining (99% of Red Back's shareholders approved the deal). Despite opposition from an advisor to Kinross's Investors (and others who estimate the company is overpaying for Red Back based on reserves estimates), KGC plans to close the deal within days of the approval.

Red Back Mining was delisted from the Australian stock exchange in May 2004. Delisted from Toronto stock exchange in May 2004.

== History ==
In 2003 it was formed after a merger between Red Back Mining NL of Australia and Champion Resources Inc of Canada. Its flagship mine, Chirano began producing gold in 4th quarter of 2005 through its subsidiary Chirano Gold Mines Limited (CGML). In August 2007 acquired the Tasiast gold mine from Lundin Mining Corporation for 225 million USD which opened on July 18, 2007. The Chirano mine produced 30,427 ounces of gold its first year and was scheduled to produce 123,000 ounces in each of the next 8.5 years. 2007 saw a 76% increase in gold production on a rising gold price; acquisitions; and higher probable reserve estimates for its key mines. In 2009 it failed in its attempt to acquire Moto Goldmines whose key asset was a 70% stake in one of Africa's largest undeveloped gold deposits.

== Production in 2010 and 2009 ==
The company produced 342,085 ounces in 2009, a 31% increase over 2008 production, and has set a target of 800,000 oz for 2012. Red Back's 90% share of Chirano and 100% share of Tasiast produced 402,000 ounces of gold equivalent in 2010.

The Tasiast Mine produced 158,660 oz in 2009, 185,000 in 2010 (2010 was previously forecast to be 245-265,000 ounces).

The Chirano Mine produced 185,425 oz in 2009, 240-260,000 oz projected for 2010. 4.4 million ounces of gold.

Cash operating costs per ounce in 2009 rose to $391 compared to $325–$350 for the previous year.

== Main areas of exploration ==
- Mauritania - Tasiast
- Ghana - Chirano, Bolgatanga (in cooperation with Etruscan Resources Inc.), Ahafo North, Bibiani North, Akyem, Enchi, and Bole.

== See also ==
- Mining industry of Ghana
- Mineral industry of Africa
