= Mining feasibility study =

Evaluation of the profitability of a mining project

A mining feasibility study is an evaluation of a proposed mining project to determine whether the mineral resource can be mined economically. There are three types of feasibility study used in mining, order of magnitude, preliminary feasibility and detailed feasibility.

== Order of magnitude ==
Order of magnitude feasibility studies (sometimes referred to as "scoping studies") are an initial financial appraisal of an inferred mineral resource. Depending on the size of the project, an order of magnitude study may be carried out by a single individual. It will involve a preliminary mine plan, and is the basis for determining whether to proceed with an exploration program, and more detailed engineering work. Order-of-magnitude studies are developed by copying plans and factoring known costs from existing projects completed elsewhere and are accurate to within 40–50%.

== Preliminary feasibility ==
Preliminary feasibility studies or "pre-feasibility studies" are more detailed than order of magnitude studies. A preliminary feasibility study is used in due diligence work, determining whether to proceed with a detailed feasibility study and as a "reality check" to determine areas within the project that require more attention. Preliminary feasibility studies are done by factoring known unit costs and by estimating gross dimensions or quantities once conceptual or preliminary engineering and mine design has been completed. Preliminary feasibility studies are completed by a small group of multi-disciplined technical individuals and have an accuracy within 20–30%.

== Detailed feasibility ==
Detailed feasibility studies are the most detailed and will determine definitively whether to proceed with the project. A detailed feasibility study will be the basis for capital appropriation, and will provide the budget figures for the project. Detailed feasibility studies require a significant amount of formal engineering work, are accurate to within 10–15% and can cost between ½–1½% of the total estimated project cost.
