= Copiapó (volcano) =

Mountain in Chile

- Azufre
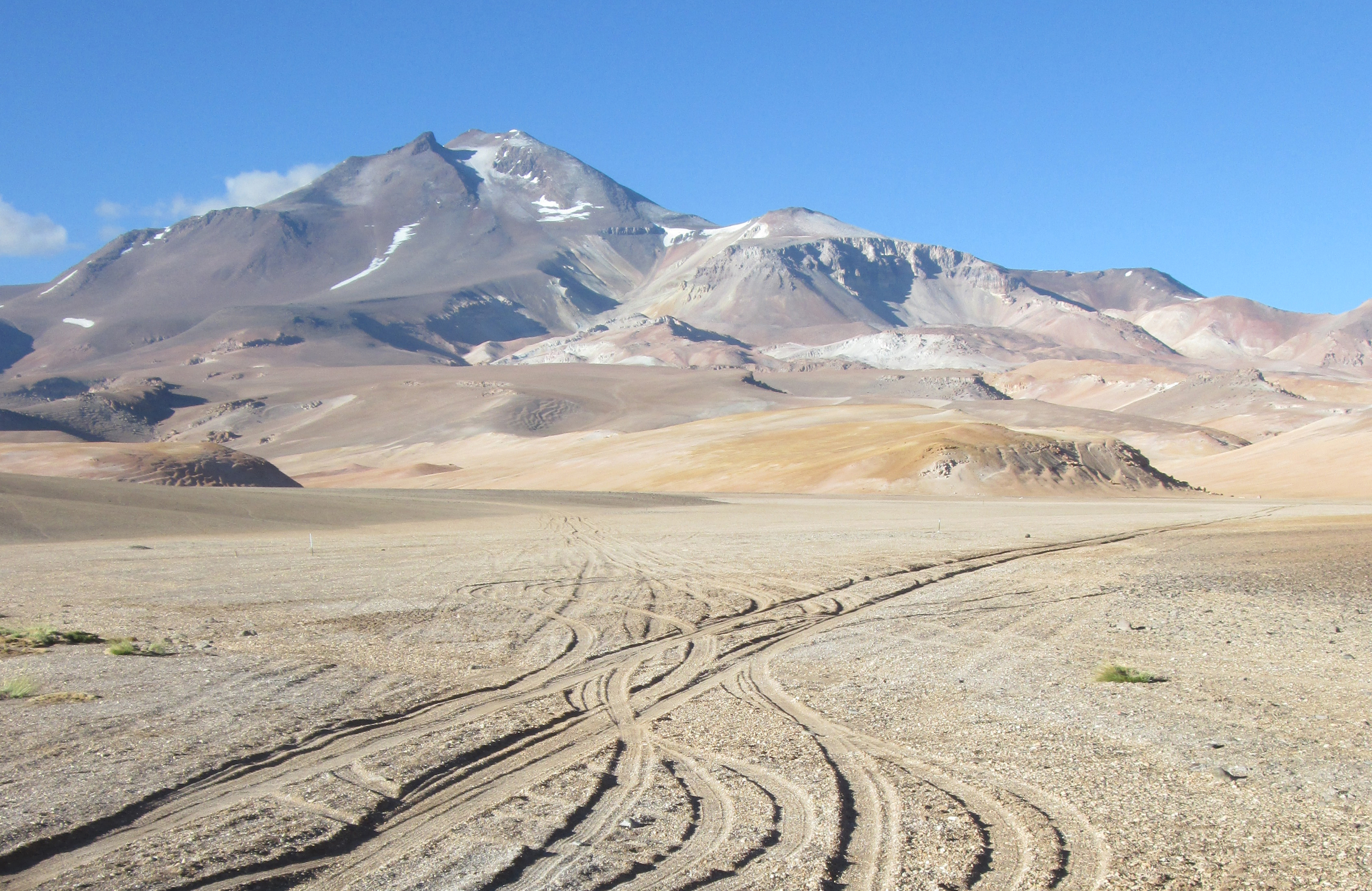
- Volcan Copiapó from Quebrada Villalobos

Highest point
- Elevation: 6,052 m (19,856 ft)
- Prominence: 1,701 m (5,581 ft)
- Parent peak: Ojos del Salado
- Listing: Ultra
- Coordinates: 27°18′21″S 69°07′51″W

Geography
- Location within Chile
- Location: Chile
- Parent range: Andes

Geology
- Mountain type: Stratovolcano
- Last eruption: Unknown

Climbing
- First ascent: Pre columbian, first modern ascent by Stefan Osiecki, Witold Paryski, Jan Szczepanski and Justyn Wojsznis (Poland) in 03/10/1937.

Copiapó, also known as Azufre, is a stratovolcano located in the Atacama Region of Chile. The volcano separates the two portions in which Nevado Tres Cruces National Park is divided. In its vicinity lies Ojos del Salado. At its summit an Inca platform can be found.

Dacitic volcanism occurred at this centre 11-7 million years ago and covered a surface of 200 square kilometres (77 sq mi). The Valle Ancho fault can be traced beneath this volcano. The main cone is formed by dacites and block and ash flows that were later intruded by dacitic porphyries, associated with hydrothermal alteration. A smaller centre formed on the northern side of the main cone, as well as thick (100–300 metres (330–980 ft)) ignimbrites in two units. A complex of lava domes lies at their southern-eastern end with more hydrothermally altered porphyric intrusions named Azufrera de Copiapo. The last activity 6-7 million years ago formed a shield overlying the lava dome complex and the San Roman dome. Obsidian from this volcanic area has been found in archeological sites.

Some rocks in the upper parts of the volcano may be of Quaternary age. The Global Volcanism Program claims that Copiapó was reported to be fumarolically active by Ferdinand von Wolff 1929 who refers to Rudolph Hauthal; it also gives "Lastarria" and "Azufre" as alternative names for Copiapó. Hauthal does not refer to Copiapó volcano as fumarolically active, but instead refers to Azufre and Lastarria which are volcanoes unrelated to Copiapó.

== Climbing ==
There is an Inca ruin about 40 metres (130 ft) from the summit, accessible via the northern ridge. The platform measures 10 by 6 metres (33 by 20 ft) and has a 4 metres (13 ft) high wall. The summit is probably 6,065 metres (19,898 ft) based on a Tandem-X study.

The first recorded modern climb was by Stefan Osiecki, Witold Paryski, Jan Szczepanski and Justyn Wojsznis (Poland) October 3, 1937.

== Gallery ==
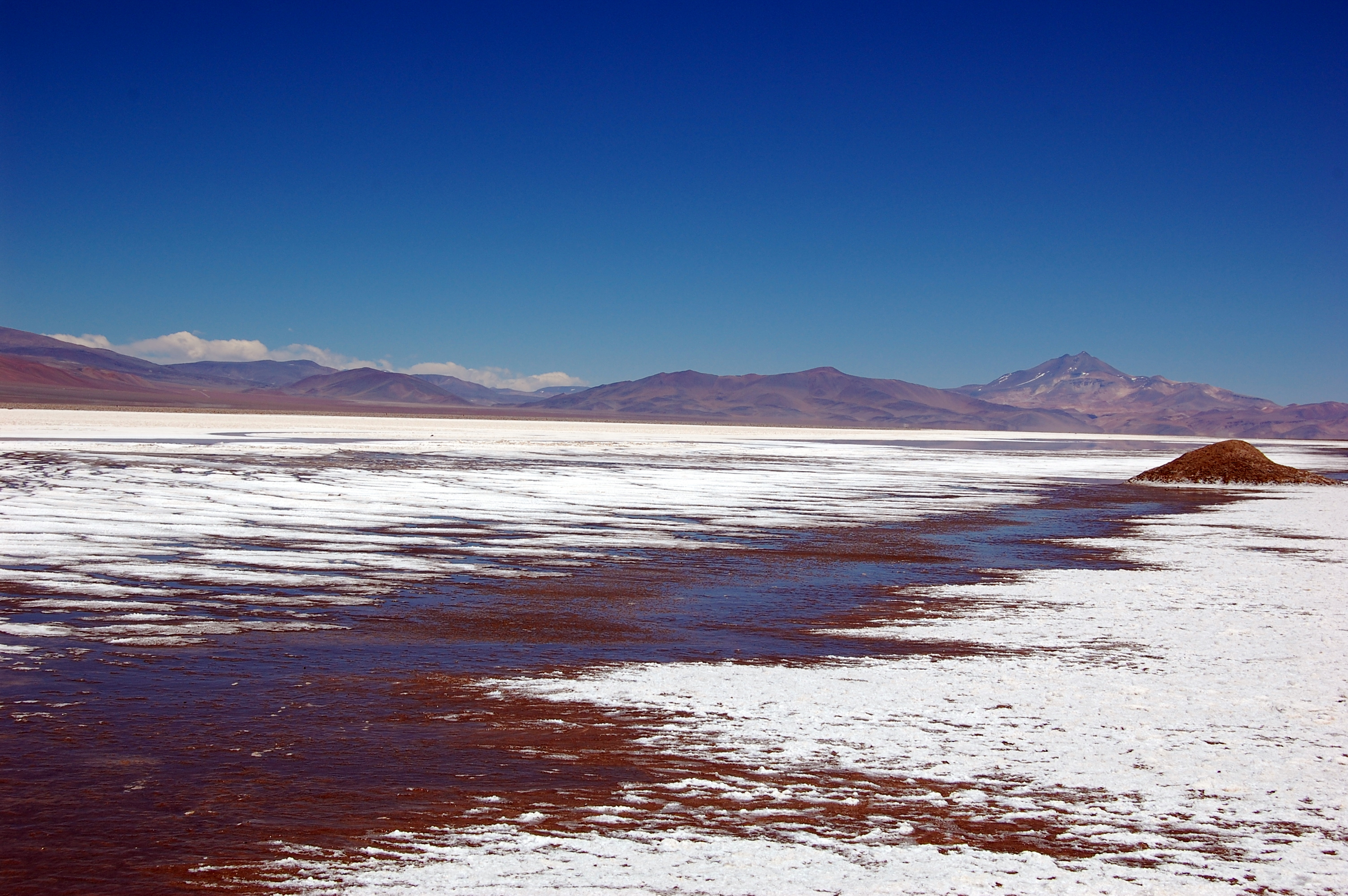
Maricunga Salt Flat with Copiapó Volcano in the distance

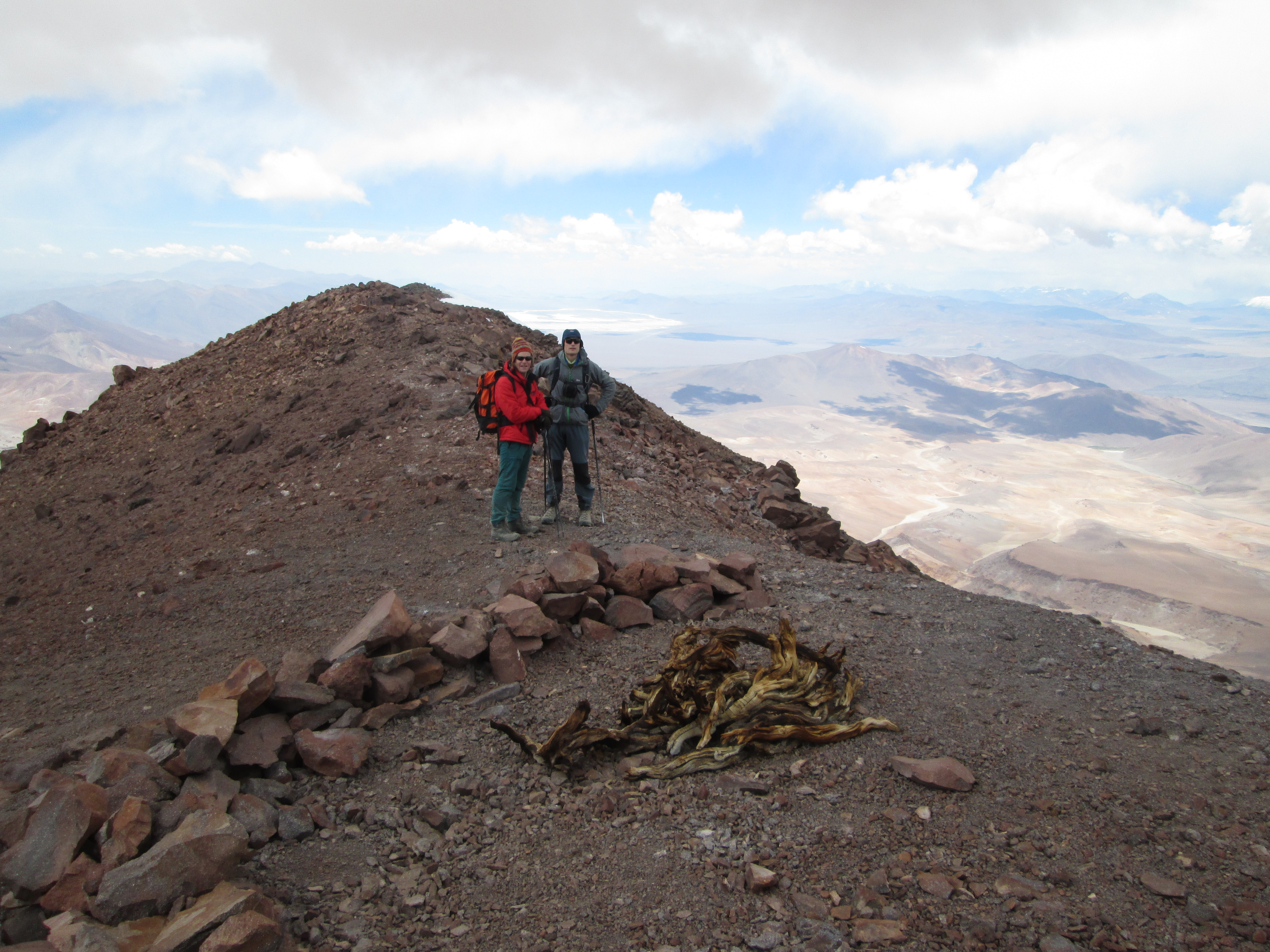
Volcan Copiapó summit showing "Inca" structures and firewood

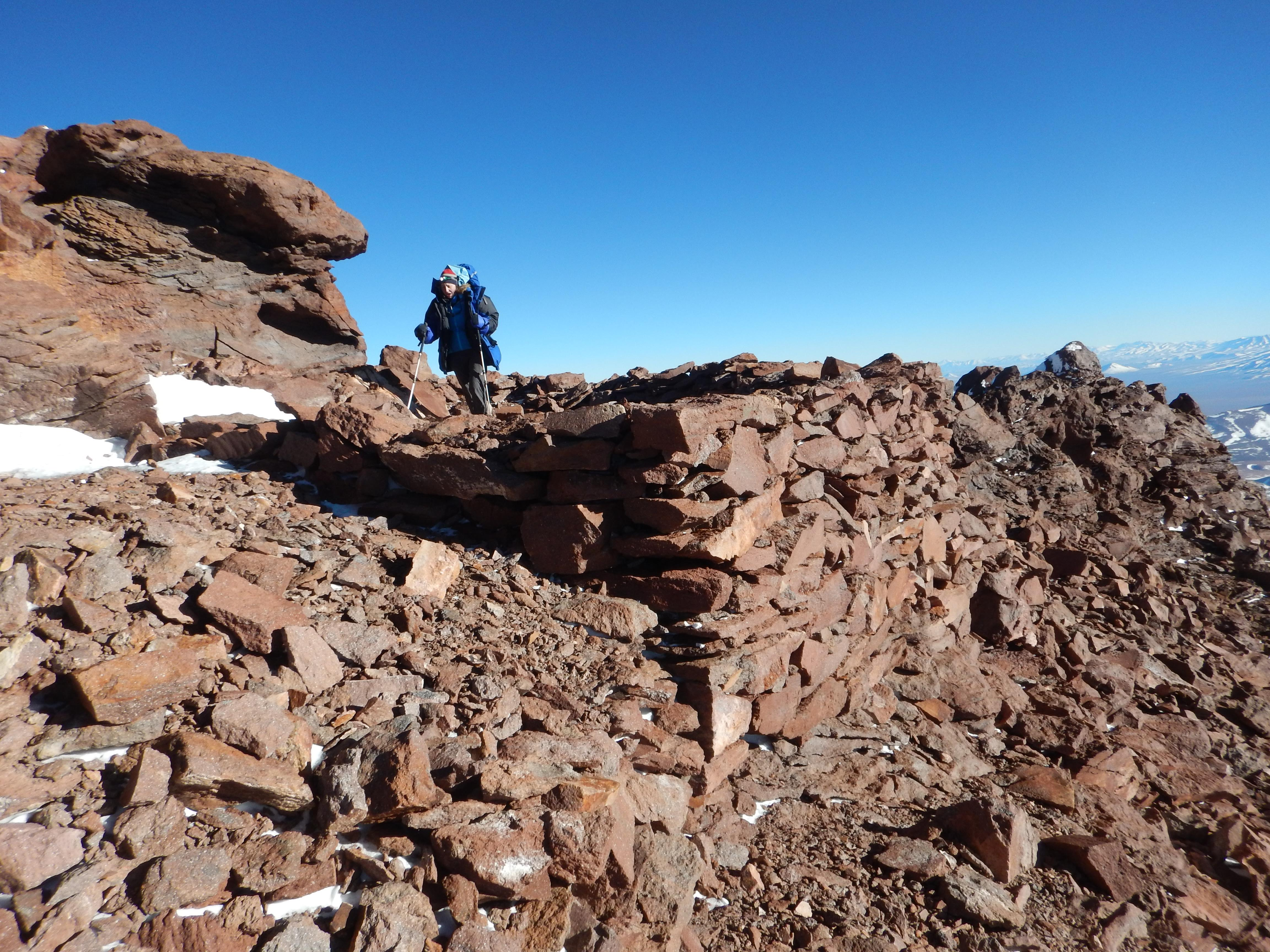
Incan platform at 6045 m altitude

== See also ==
- List of volcanoes in Chile
- List of Ultras of South America
