= Maricunga Gold Belt =

The Maricunga Gold Belt (Spanish: Cinturón aurífero de Maricunga) or Maricunga Metallogenic Belt is an area rich in gold veins in Atacama Region, Chile. It runs as trend from the vicinity of the Argentine border in a northwestern direction, but does not reach the Pacific Ocean. There is both gold and some silver of high sulphidation epithermal origin and gold with copper of porphyry type in the belt. The gold belt lies at the southern end of the Central Volcanic Zone of the Andes and different volcanic complexes are geographically associated with any of the two mineralization types.

== See also ==
- Maricunga Gold Mine
- Salar de Maricunga
