= Silberhorn (New Zealand) =

Mountain in New Zealand

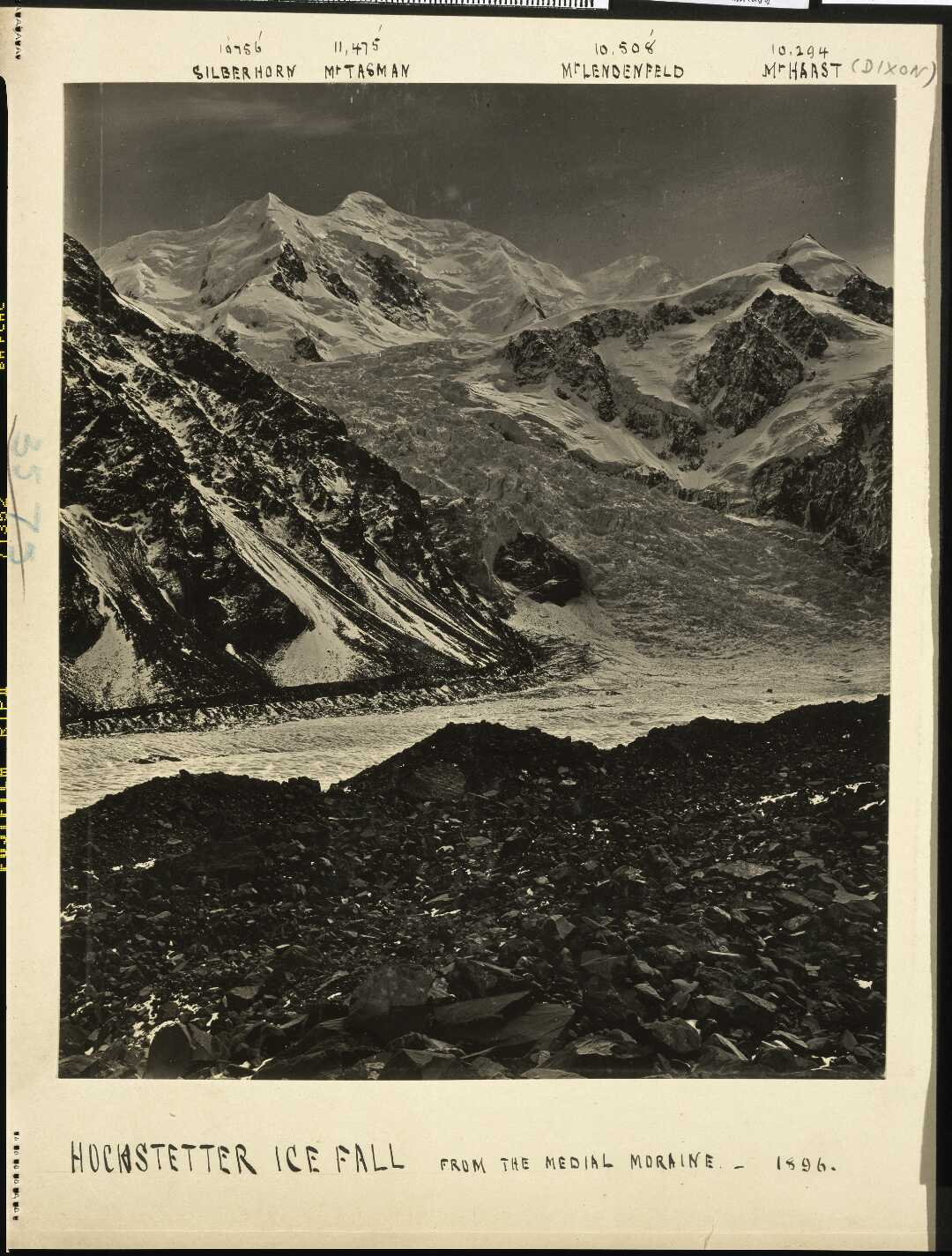
- Silberhorn (left) with the Hochstetter Glacier in the foreground

Highest point
- Elevation: 3,300 m (10,800 ft)
- Prominence: 92 m (302 ft)
- Coordinates: 43°34′S 170°9′E

Naming
- Native name: Rangirua (Māori)

Geography
- Location within New Zealand
- Location: South Island, New Zealand
- Parent range: Southern Alps / Kā Tiritiri o te Moana

Climbing
- First ascent: 1895
- Easiest route: glacier/snow/ice climb

Silberhorn (Māori: Rangirua) is the fifth highest peak in New Zealand, rising to 3,300 metres (10,800 ft). It is located in the Southern Alps on the south ridge of Mount Tasman (3,497 m). Its name, "silver horn" in German, was probably given by William Spotswood Green in 1882 after its resemblance to Silberhorn in the Swiss Alps. Its Māori name, Rangirua, literally translates to 'second sky' (rangi: sky; rua: two). The first ascent of Silberhorn was in 1895 by Edward FitzGerald and his guide Matthias Zurbriggen.

== See also ==
- List of mountains of New Zealand by height
