= Liolaemus fitzgeraldi =

Conservation status
- Least Concern (IUCN 3.1)

Scientific classification
- Kingdom: Animalia
- Phylum: Chordata
- Class: Reptilia
- Order: Squamata
- Suborder: Iguania
- Family: Liolaemidae
- Genus: Liolaemus
- Species: L. fitzgeraldi

Binomial name
- Liolaemus fitzgeraldi Boulenger, 1899

Species of lizard

Liolaemus fitzgeraldi, commonly known as Fitzgerald's tree iguana and la lagartija de Aconcagua (in Spanish), is a species of lizard in the family Liolaemidae. It is native to southwestern South America.

== Etymology ==
The specific name, fitzgeraldi, is in honor of mountaineer Edward Arthur FitzGerald.

== Geographic range ==
L. fitzgeraldi is found in the Andes in Argentina (Mendoza Province, San Juan Province) and Chile (Coquimbo Region, Valparaíso Region.

== Habitat ==
The preferred natural habitats of L. fitzgeraldi are shrubland and grassland, at altitudes of 2,700–4,500 m (8,900–14,800 ft).

== Reproduction ==
L. fitzgeraldi is ovoviviparous.
