= Mount Tasman =

Mountain in New Zealand

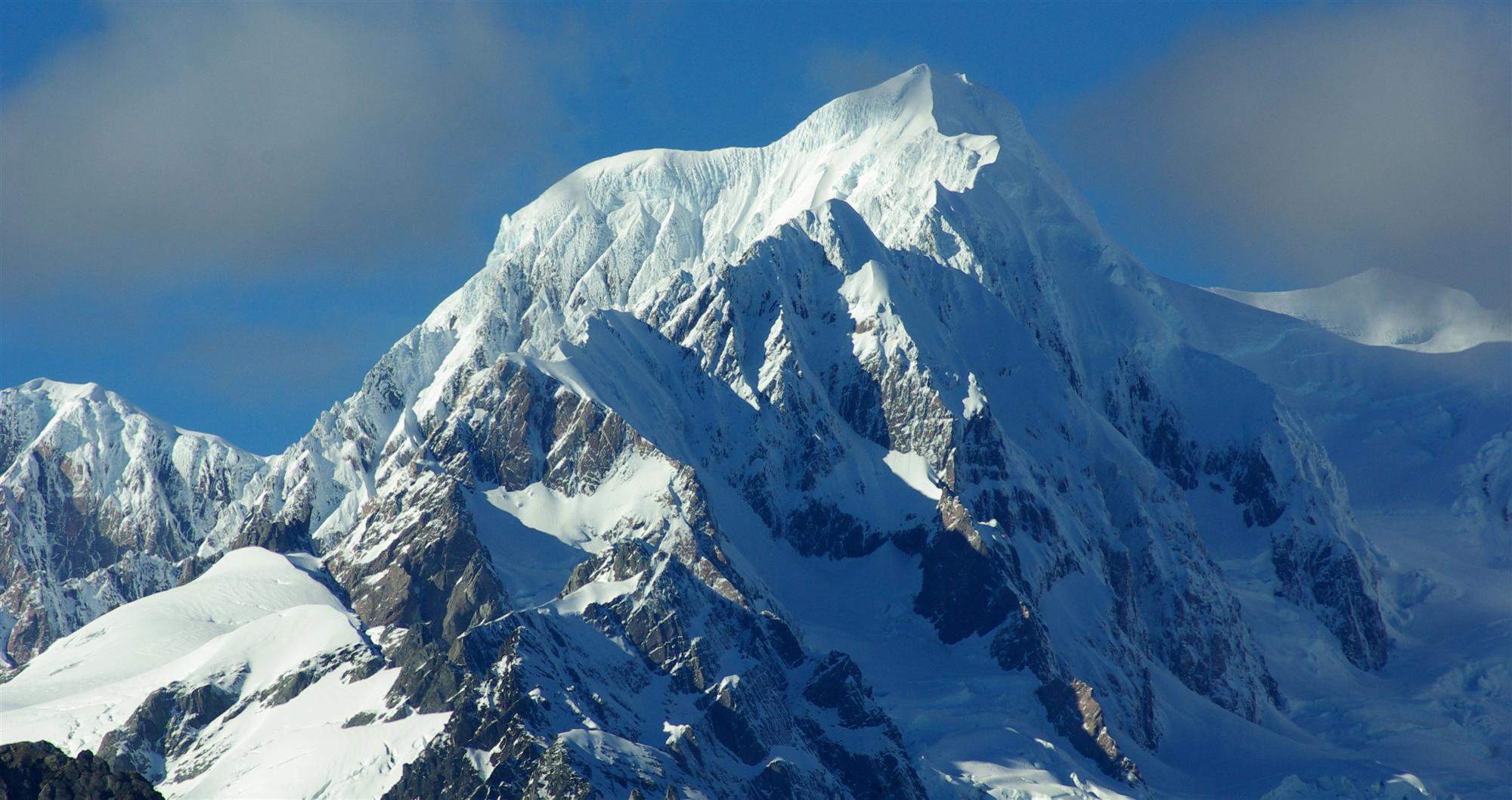

Highest point
- Elevation: 3,497 m (11,473 ft)
- Prominence: 519 m (1,703 ft)
- Listing: New Zealand #2
- Coordinates: 43°34′S 170°9′E

Naming
- Native name: Te Horokōau (Māori)

Geography
- Location within New Zealand
- Location: Location in New Zealand
- Parent range: Southern Alps

Climbing
- First ascent: February 1895 by Edward Fitzgerald, Matthias Zurbriggen und Jack Clarke
- Easiest route: glacier/snow/ice climb

Mount Tasman (Te Horokōau in Māori) is New Zealand's second-highest mountain, rising to a height of 3,497 metres (11,473 ft). It is located in the Southern Alps of the South Island, four kilometres to the north of its larger neighbour, Aoraki / Mount Cook. Unlike Aoraki / Mount Cook, Mount Tasman sits on the South Island's Main Divide, on the border between Aoraki / Mount Cook National Park and Westland Tai Poutini National Park. It is the highest point in Westland District.

The first ascent of Mount Tasman was in 1895 by Edward FitzGerald and his guide Matthias Zurbriggen.

The Māori name (horo: to swallow; koau: shag or Phalacrocorax varius) is believed to refer to the swelling in the neck of a shag when it is swallowing a fish.

== Aoraki / Mount Cook National Park ==
Mount Tasman is located in Aoraki / Mount Cook National Park in the Canterbury Region, which was established in 1953 and along with Westland Tai Poutini National Park, Mount Aspiring National Park and Fiordland National Park forms one of the UNESCO World Heritage Sites.

== Gallery ==
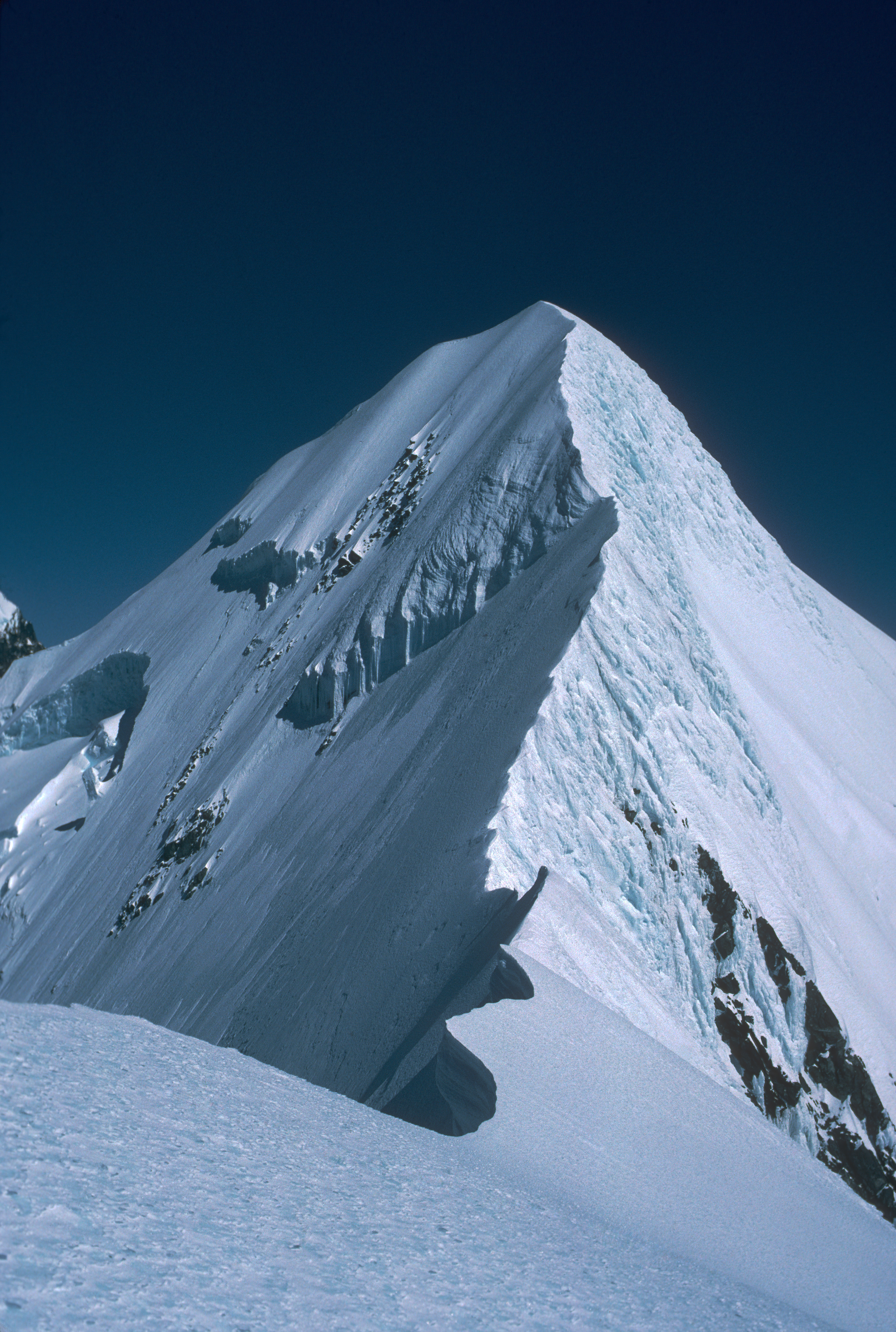
Mt Tasman north shoulder view south to summit, 21 March 1983

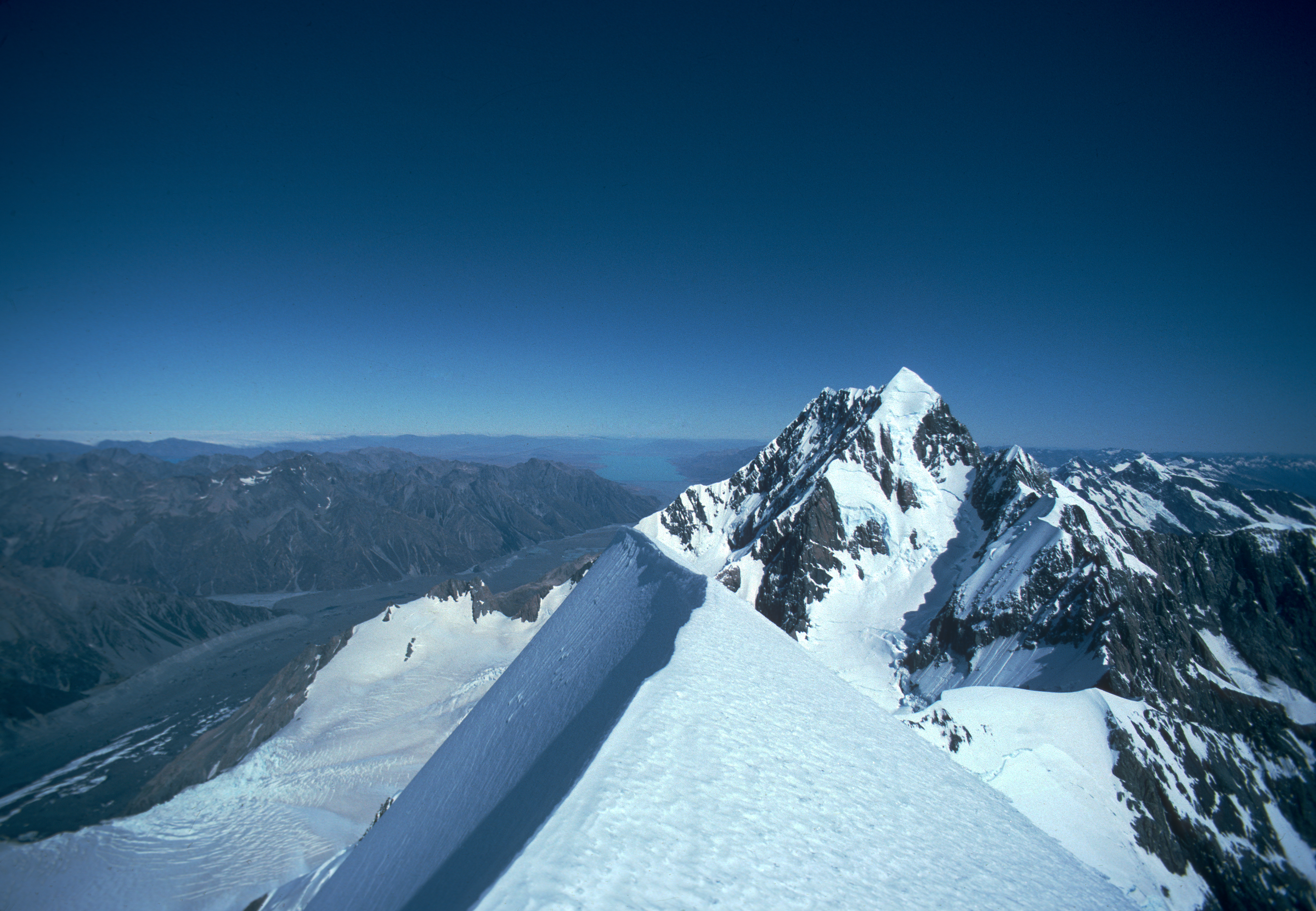
Aoraki peak from Mt Tasman summit NZ Mon 21 March 1983 wideangle

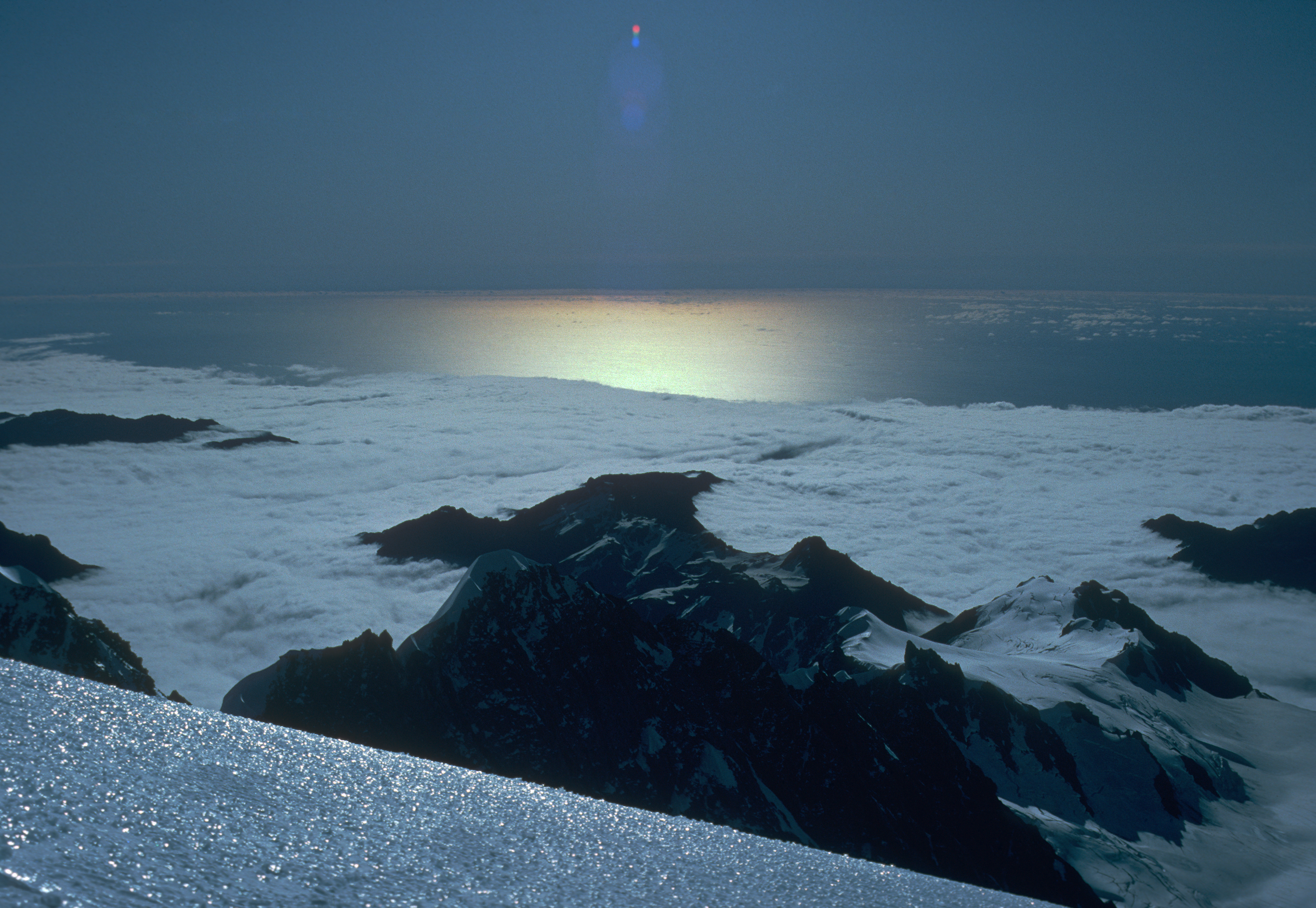
Mt Tasman north shoulder view west to Tasman Sea NZ Mon 21 March 1983

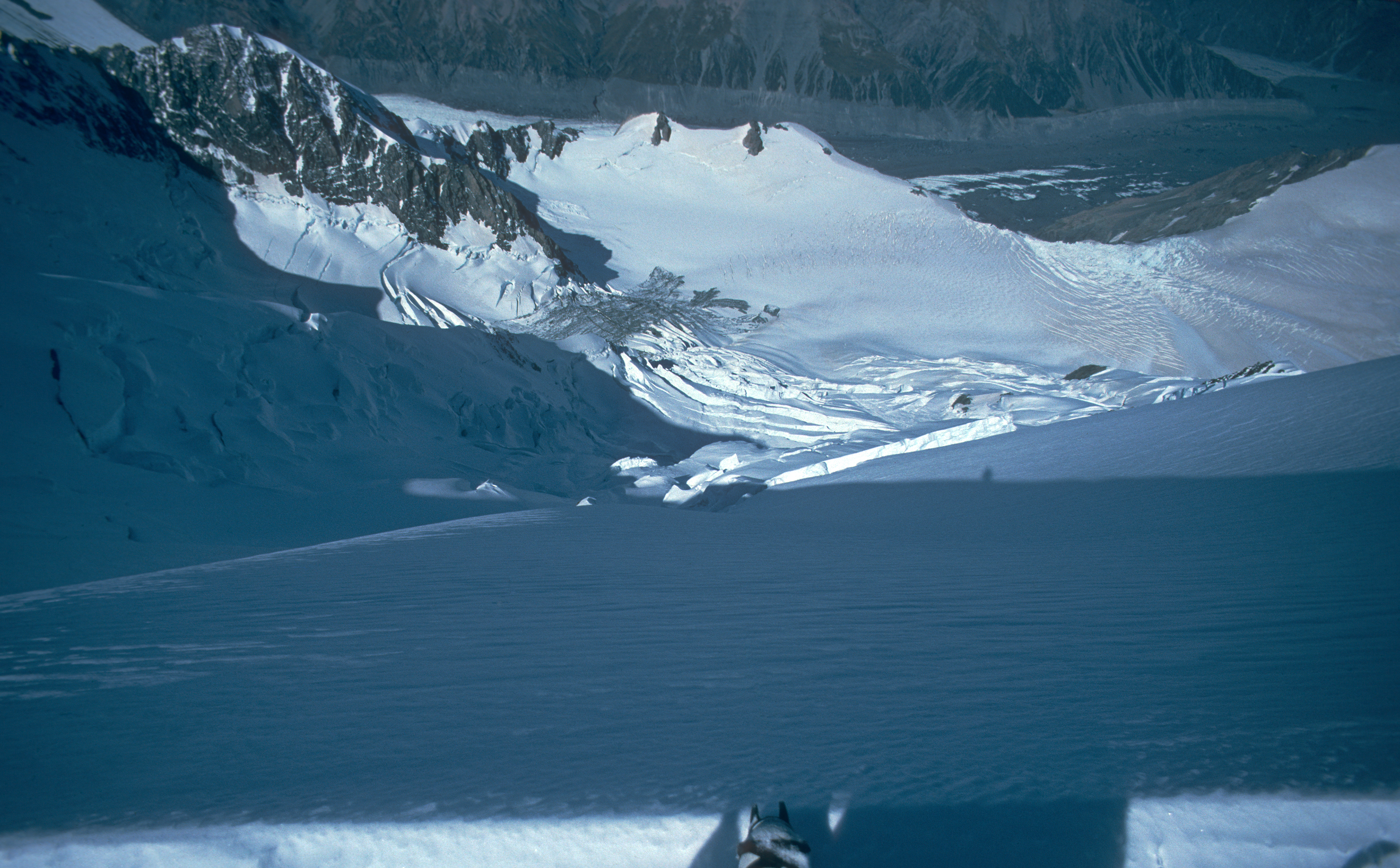
Mt Tasman summit NZ view down the east face to Grand Plateau & Tasman glacier Mon 21 March 1983

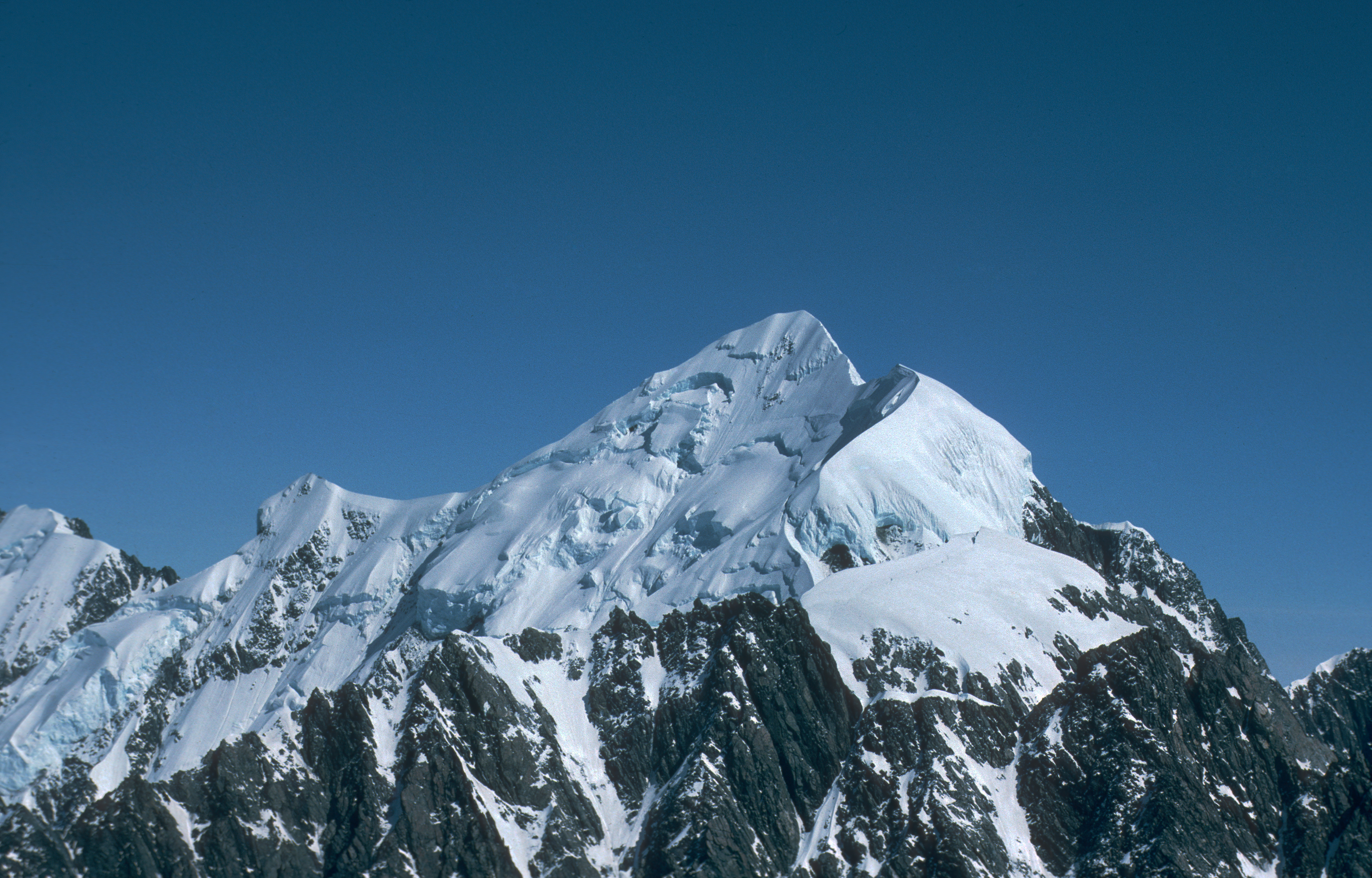
Mt Tasman peak looking SW from Mt Haidinger summit, 19 March 1983

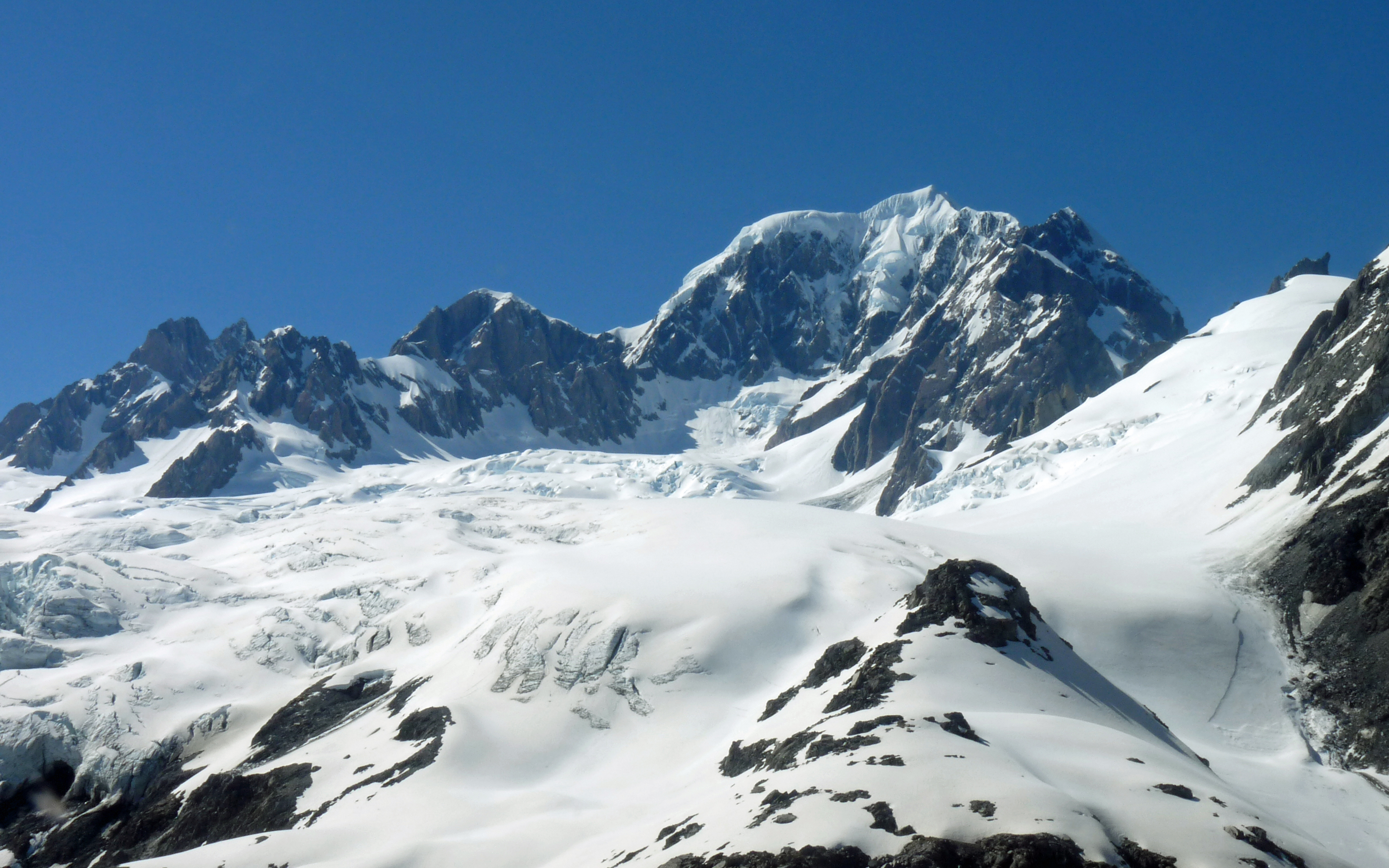
Mt Haast, Mt Lendenfeld, Mt Tasman and Torres Peak NZ helicopter view from NW, Nov 28 2008

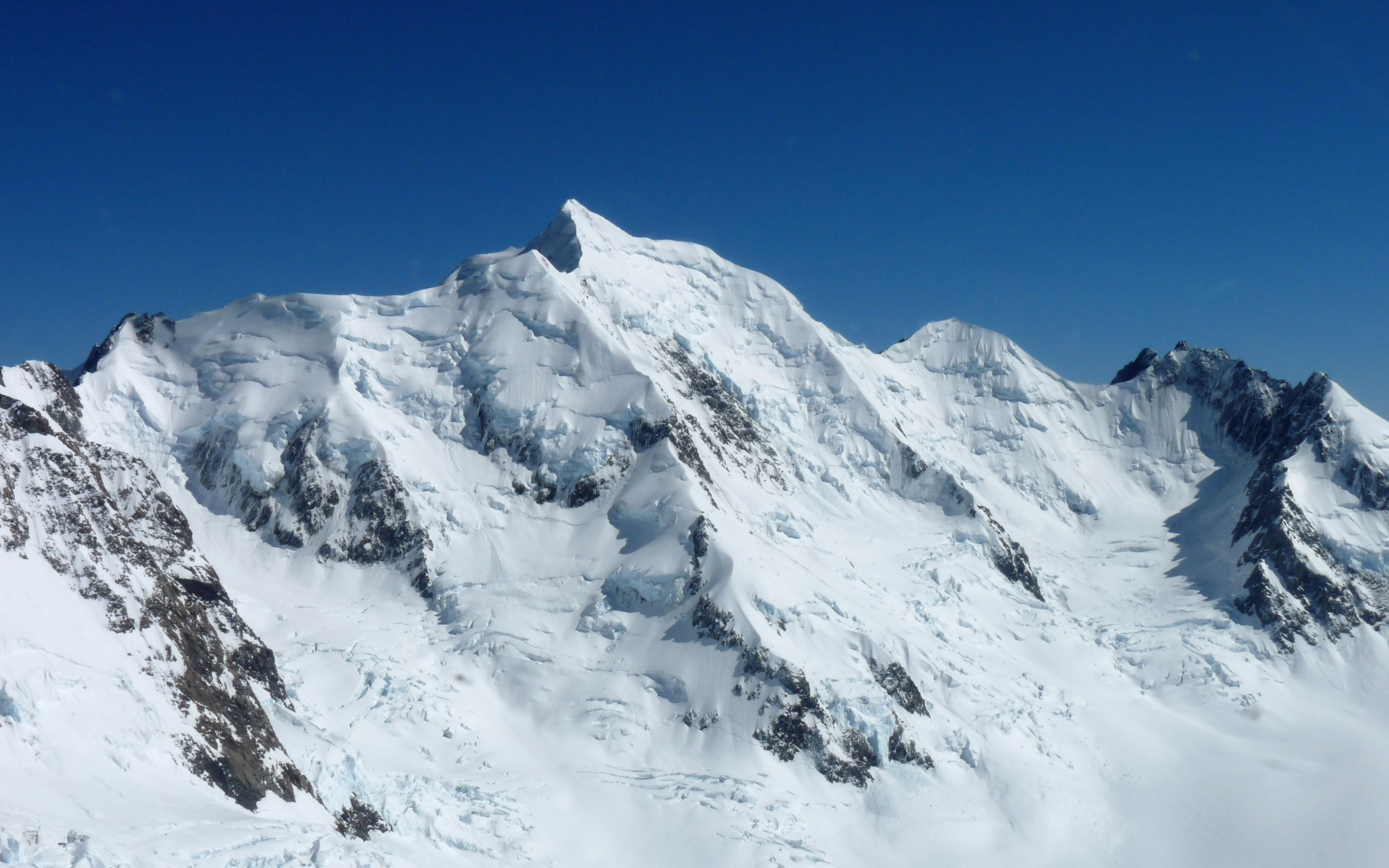
Mt Tasman helicopter view from SE above Grand Plateau, Nov 28 2008

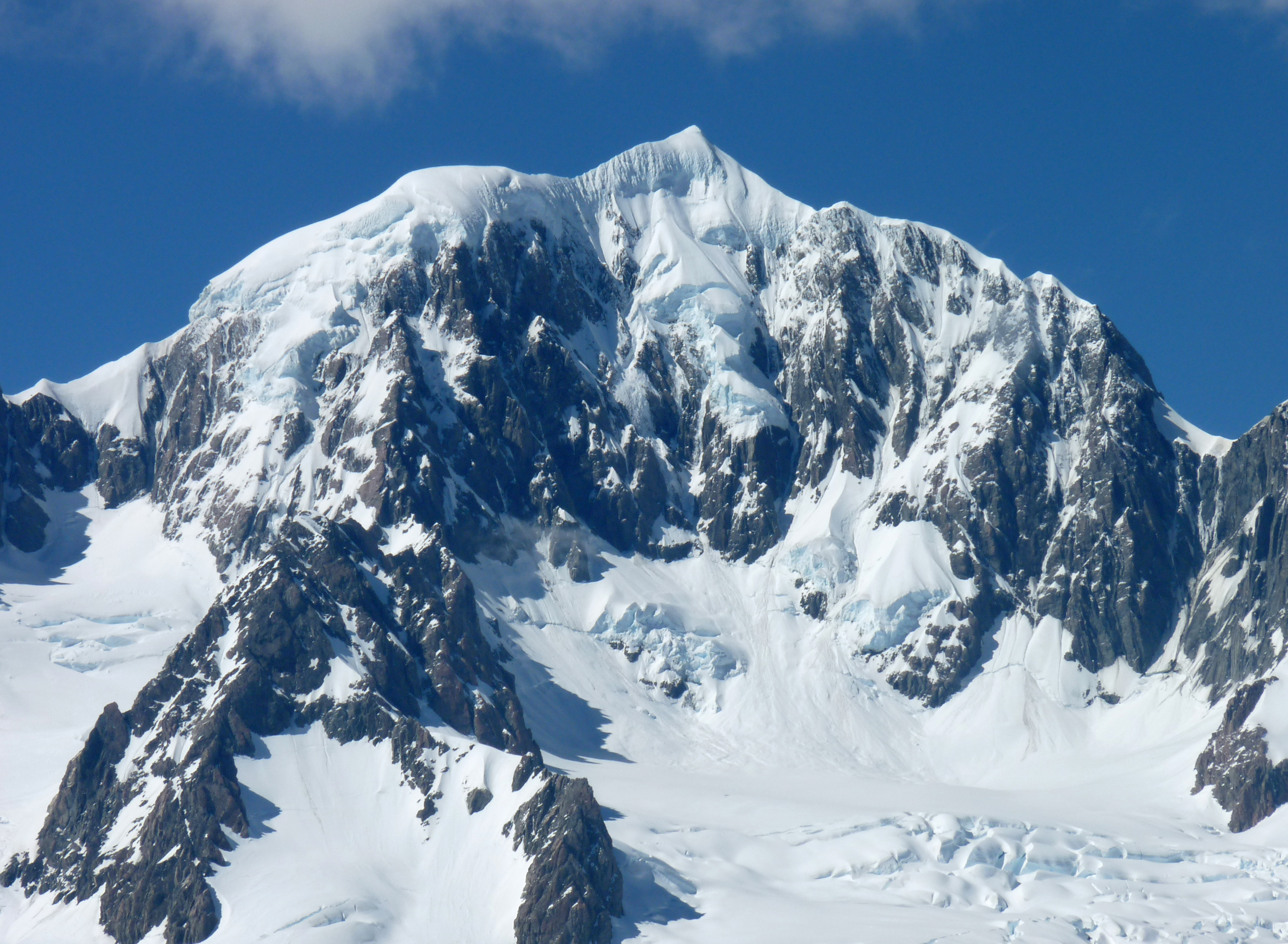
Mt Tasman viewed from north at helicopter landing on Fox nevé, Nov 28 2008

== See also ==
- List of mountains of New Zealand by height
