= Daniela Sandoval =

Ecuadorian athlete (born 1991)

Daniela Cristina Sandoval Bravo
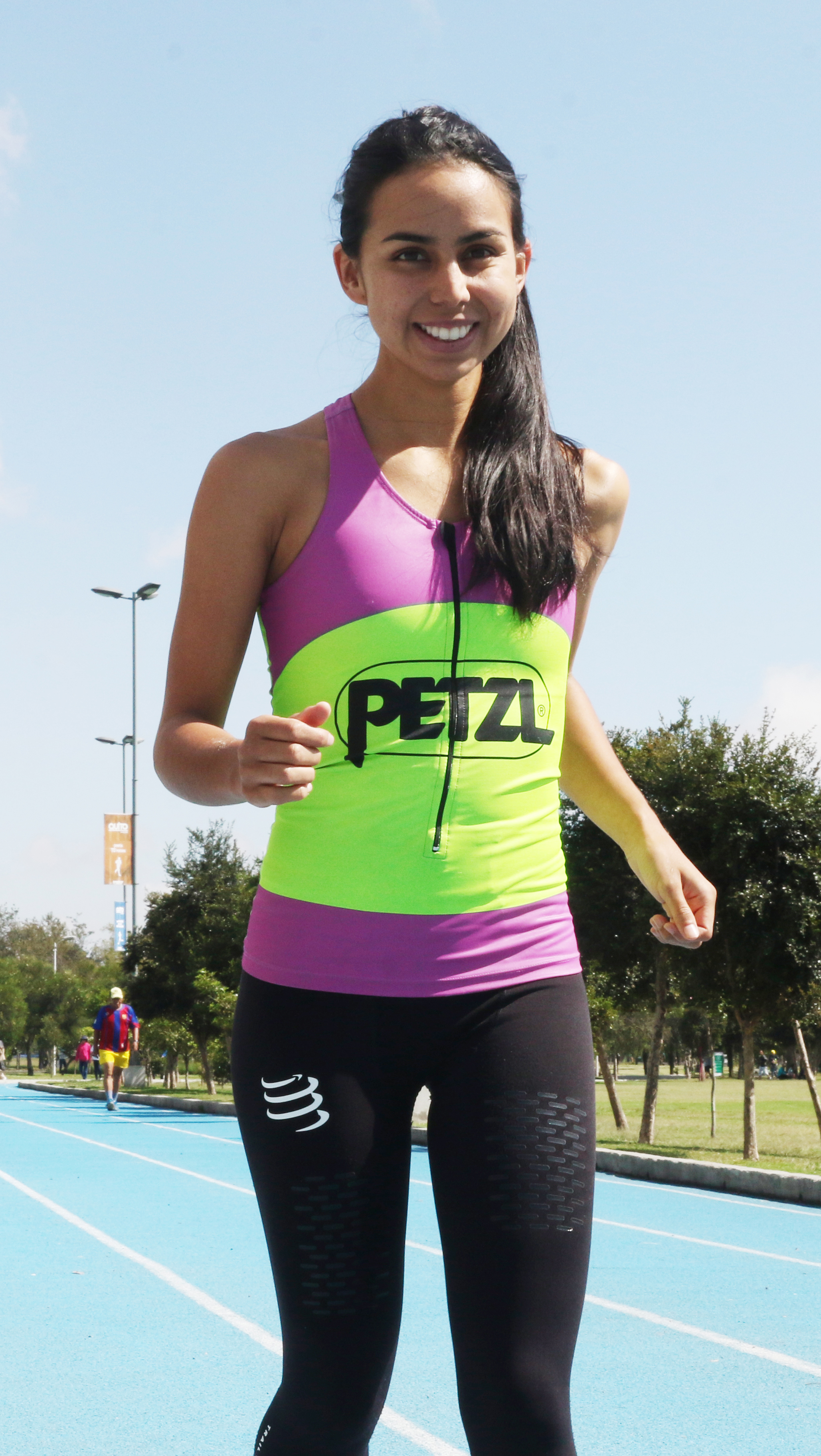
- Daniela Sandoval in 2018

Personal information
- Born: January 18, 1991 (age 35) Quito, Ecuador
- Occupation: Physical therapist

Sport
- Sport: Mountain climbing, running, cycling

Daniela Cristina Sandoval Bravo (born January 18, 1991) is an Ecuadorian athlete, mountain climber, cyclist, and physical therapist.

Sandoval was born in Quito. She is best known for climbing and descending Aconcagua, a 6,962 m (22,841 ft) tall mountain, in 20 hours and 17 minutes, breaking the previous women's record. She climbed the mountain using the usual route: she started on the north face of the mountain, traveled from the Valley of Horcones to the summit, and descended.

Daniela Sandoval belongs to the team Ecuador Closer to the Sun.

== Biography ==
When she was nine, Sandoval joined the Mountain Climbing Club at the Pontifical Catholic University of Ecuador; her parents, Consuelo Bravo and Eduardo Sandoval, were also members. She attended the "Free Air" holiday camps, organized in Quito by Fabián Zurita, where she perfected mountain climbing techniques.

As an adolescent, Sandoval visited mountains with her family, but she only dedicated herself to mountain athletics at the age of 18.

Daniela Sandoval has participated in long-distance trail running races since she was 18. In 2017, she won first place in the PETZL Trail Plus Race, held in Baños, Ecuador.

In January 2018, Sandoval climbed and descended Aconcagua. She set a new women's record for fastest climb; her time was 20 hours and 17 minutes. The previous record, 22 hours and 52 minutes, was set by the Brazilian mountain climber Fernanda Maciel in February 2016.

In April 2018, she climbed Cotopaxi, an active volcano in Ecuador, in 7 hours and 32 minutes. This is the first speed climbing record for Cotopaxi.

In 2018, she was the ambassador for the 58th Quito Últimas Noticias 15K race.
