= Tupungatito =

Volcano in Chile

Tupungatito Volcano
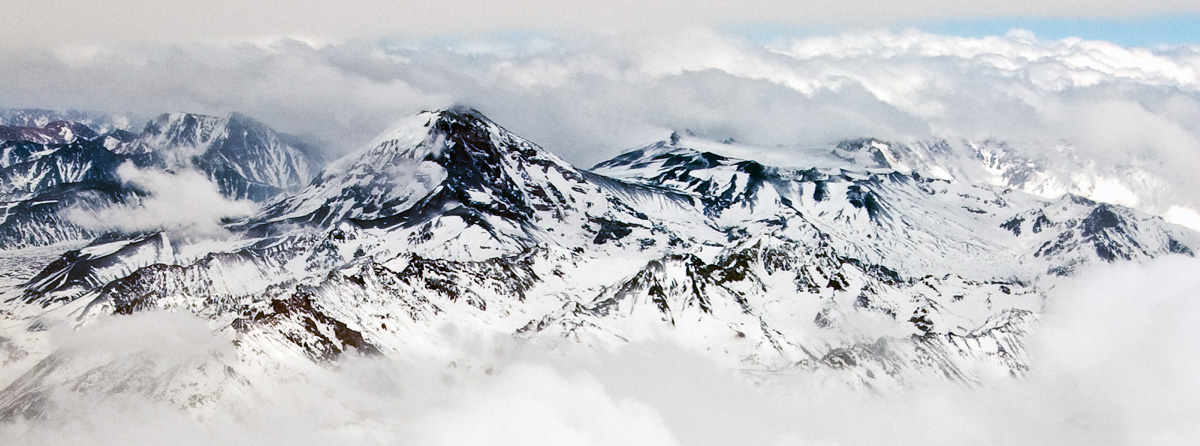
- Tupungatito is a pyroclastic cone and a series of volcanic craters on the front rim of the "Nevado Sin Nombre" caldera; the flat, circular area at the center of this image to the right of the Tupungato volcano.

Highest point
- Elevation: 5,682 m (18,600 ft)
- Coordinates: 33°23.636′S 69°49.360′W

Geography
- Location: Argentina-Chile
- Parent range: Principal Cordillera, Andes

Geology
- Mountain type: Stratovolcano
- Volcanic zone: South Volcanic Zone
- Last eruption: 1987

Volcán Tupungatito is the northernmost historically active stratovolcano of the southern Andes. Part of the Chilean Andes' volcanic segment, it is the northernmost member of the Southern Volcanic Zone (SVZ), which is one of several distinct volcanic belts in the Andes. Over 70 Pleistocene or Holocene age volcanoes make up this volcanic belt, which on average has one eruption per year.

Tupungatito lies in proximity to the border between Argentina and Chile, 50 miles east of the Chilean capital Santiago. It is a group of volcanic craters and a pyroclastic cone associated with a 5 kilometres (3.1 mi) wide caldera, and lies just southwest of the Tupungato volcano. The caldera is filled with ice, and glaciers on the volcano are important sources of water for the Rio Maipo river and Santiago.

Volcanism is caused by the subduction of the Nazca Plate underneath the South America Plate. Tupungatito formed less than 100,000 years ago and has had a number of historical eruptions, the latest in 1987, which were mostly small explosive eruptions. Presently, the volcano features an acidic crater lake and numerous fumaroles. Renewed eruptions could induce volcanic ash falls in Argentina and dangerous mudflows in Chile.

== Name and history ==
The name Tupungatito was assigned to the volcano by Luis Risopatrón, the chair of the Chilean boundary commission, in 1897. It refers to the neighbouring Tupungato volcano; Luis Risopatrón also reported that Tupungatito was an active volcano. The volcano is also known as Volcan Bravard, a name proposed by Argentina but which fell into disuse; it references the French paleontologist Auguste Bravard.

There was speculation about the existence of a volcano in the Andes near Santiago already during the Colonial Era, but only by 1890 was there a clear identification and even then it was frequently assumed that Tupungato instead was the only active edifice. The first ascent of the volcano probably took place in 1907, by K. Griebel, H. Gwinner, L. Hanisch, K. Heitmann and J. Philippi.

== Geography and geomorphology ==
Tupungatito is located in the Chilean Andes, 80 kilometres (50 mi) east from Santiago de Chile. Politically, it is part of the San Jose de Maipo municipality in the Metropolitan Region where about 40% of all Chileans live. East of Tupungatito is Argentina's Mendoza Province. The extinct 6,550 metres (21,490 ft) high, Tupungato volcano rises 7 kilometres (4.3 mi) northeast of Tupungatito. Tourism, mountaineering and hiking are the principal economic activities in the area; in addition, there are mines and hydropower plants in the valleys. Several protected areas lie in Argentina east of Tupungatito.

The volcano features a 5 kilometres (3.1 mi) wide caldera with an erupted volume of 5 cubic kilometres (1.2 cu mi) and one or two openings to the western flank, and a group of ten craters north of the caldera. Four of these craters overlap and one is located on top of a 4 kilometres (2.5 mi) wide pyroclastic cone northwest of the remaining craters. Three crater lakes are hosted within these craters; one has a turquoise colour and highly acidic water. The total volume of the volcano is estimated to be 30 cubic kilometres (7.2 cu mi), and its flows are fresh and uneroded. The caldera may either be of volcanic origin or the product of a giant landslide. In the past, lava flows have exited the caldera through the northwestern opening.

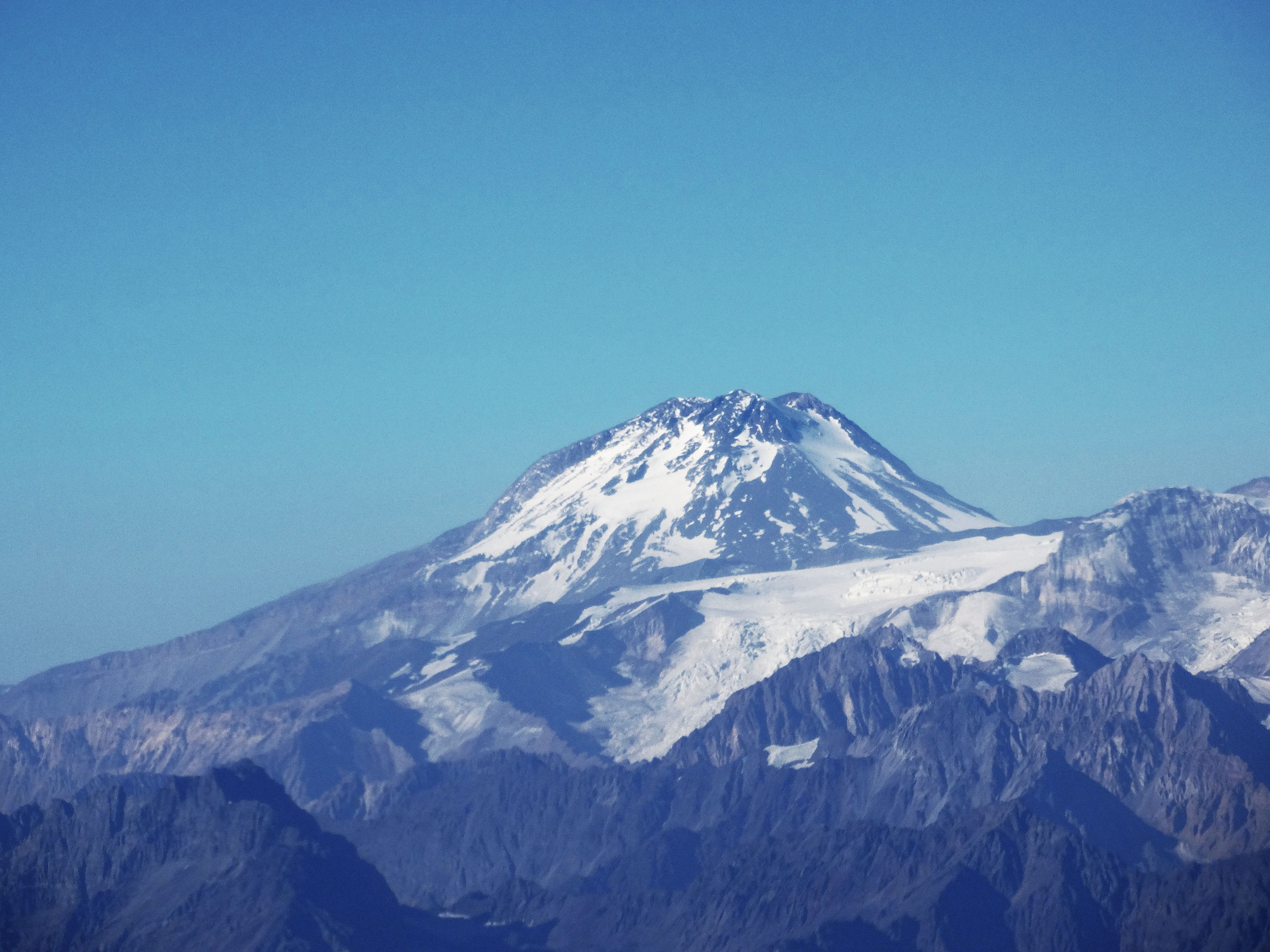
Tupungatito caldera covered with ice in front of Tupungato Volcano. View to the north from a plane,

=== Glaciers and hydrology ===
Above 5,400 metres (17,700 ft) elevation, the volcano is covered with ice. On Tupungatito ice covers an area of about 7.3 square kilometres (2.8 sq mi), which is part of a larger ice cover on regional volcanoes. The caldera contains the Tupungatito glacier, with a volume of about 1 cubic kilometre (0.24 cu mi) it is the most important glacier of the Metropolitana Region. The cold ice lacks internal water pockets and reaches a maximum thickness of 309 metres (1,014 ft). Outlet glaciers of glaciers in the region are typically covered with debris. In 2012, an ice core was drawn from the Tupungatito glacier.

The ice and snow cover on Tupungatito is an important source of water for the rivers in the region and Santiago. Meltwater is discharged westwards into the Colorado-Maipo river system that eventually flows through Santiago; the Quebrada Seca, Estero de Tupungatito and Estero de Tupungato originate close to the volcano and are tributaries to the Colorado. Some glaciers drain instead eastward into the Rio Tupungato and Tunuyán River; the former as a tributary of the Rio Mendoza is an important water source for the inhabitants of Mendoza in Argentina and the surrounding agricultural areas. Arsenic pollution in the Maipo river system may originate from springs associated the volcanoes Tupungatito and San Jose.

== Geology ==
=== Regional ===
Off the coast of South America, the Nazca Plate subducts beneath the South America Plate at a rate of 7–9 centimetres per year (2.8–3.5 in/year). Volcanism in the Andes occurs in four separate volcanic belts, the Northern Volcanic Zone, the Central Volcanic Zone, the Southern Volcanic Zone (SVZ) and the Austral Volcanic Zone.

The SVZ is a 1,400 kilometres (870 mi) long and, depending on latitude, up to 200 kilometres (120 mi) wide chain of Quaternary volcanoes, subdivided according to two schemes in two or three sectors. It features over 70 Pleistocene or Holocene stratovolcanoes, as well as calderas, maars and scoria cones. About 30-40 were active postglacially and 18-20 in historical times; the SVZ is the most active volcanic zone in Chile with about one eruption per year. Tupungatito is part of the northernmost SVZ, a narrow and short chain which includes Diamante caldera/ Volcan Maipo and San Jose volcano, and is the northernmost active volcano of the SVZ. (Note: Tupungato is the northernmost volcano of the SVZ.) Tupungato-Tupungatito, San Jose-Marmolejo and Maipo are the highest volcanoes of the SVZ.

=== Local ===
The volcano lies on a c. 50 kilometres (31 mi) thick crust, which together with the tectonic regime has influenced the composition of ascending magma. The basement underneath Tupungatito consists of evaporites and marine limestones of Cretaceous age. Cretaceous conglomerates, sandstones and volcaniclastic rocks, as well as Miocene sediments. The Mesozoic rocks have been deformed during regional tectonic activity and there are numerous reverse faults in the area. Southwest-northeast and north-south trending faults and fractures influence volcanic activity at Tupungatito; the SW-NE trending lineament also includes Tupungato.

The volcano forms a volcanic group with Tupungato and another peak, 6,000 metres (20,000 ft) high Nevado Sin Nombre. Tupungato and Nevado Sin Nombre formed during the ear Pleistocene and are presently inactive. The caldera is to a large degree formed by rocks from Nevado Sin Nombre. 6,111 metres (20,049 ft) high Cerro Alto and 6,017 metres (19,741 ft)-6,019 metres (19,747 ft) high Nevado de los Piuquenes are the other volcanoes in this group, south of Nevado Sin Nombre. Tupungatito forms the "young" unit of this volcanic group, while the others constitute the "old" unit. Below 4,700 metres (15,400 ft) elevation, Tupungatito is underlaid by an eroded volcano whose rocks resemble Tupungato.

=== Composition ===
Tupungatito has erupted rocks ranging from basaltic andesite to dacite, which define a potassium-rich calc-alkaline suite. There has been little compositional variation during its history. Phenocrysts include clinopyroxene and plagioclase and less commonly olivine and orthopyroxene, augite and hypersthene have also been reported. Amphibole and biotite occur as xenocrysts. Magma genesis at Tupungatito and other volcanoes in the region appears to involve a small amount of fluids but large amounts of sediments carried down by the slab, with a moderate interaction with the crust. Processes involved are fractional crystallization, low degrees of partial melting and short periods of storage in magma chambers.

== Climate ==
The mean annual temperature on Tupungatito is about −15.5 °C (4.1 °F) and annual snow accumulation is about 0.5 metres (1 ft 8 in) snow water equivalent. During the winter, the area above 2,500–2,700 metres (8,200–8,900 ft) elevation is covered with up to 4 metres (13 ft) of snow. Most precipitation occurs between May and September, when the north-south movement of the South Pacific High and the Westerlies lets frontal systems reach the area.

Glaciers have alternatively advanced and retreated during the 20th century. There is some uncertainty as sometimes snow cover is confused for glacial ice. As of 2016 ice covers an area of 112.84 ± 3.66 square kilometres (43.57 ± 1.41 sq mi), down from 119.89 ± 8.36 square kilometres (46.29 ± 3.23 sq mi) in 1986; this encompasses the ice cover of Tupungatito and other volcanoes in the area. Volcanic eruptions have not significantly altered the ice extent.

== Eruption history ==
Tupungatito is about 55,000 or less than 80,000 years old. Early activity was effusive, producing lava flows up to 18 kilometres (11 mi) long as well as debris flows, lahars, and pyroclastic flows which invaded the Rio Colorado valley. Two sequences of volcanic rocks crop out in the valley and its tributaries, both with thicknesses of about 30 metres (98 ft). They have been dated to 52,000±23,000 and 31,000±10,000 years ago, respectively. About 30,000 years ago, a change to a more effusive style of volcanic activity took place, although with shorter lava flows. Numerous debris avalanches took place on Tupungatito and left deposits in the western valleys. Tupungatito may be the source of late Pleistocene rhyolite deposits around the city of Mendoza and Pleistocene tephra overlying glacial deposits in the Rio Mendoza valley. Lava flows have invaded well-defined glacial valleys.

Holocene activity added an explosive component with Vulcanian and phreatomagmatic eruptions, which deposited pyroclastic materials around the volcano. Short lava flows with lengths of on average 7 kilometres (4.3 mi) were also produced and display flow structures such as levees and lobes. Some of the flows are covered with sediments. The decline of the ice cover during the Holocene and an increased distance between glaciers and volcanic vents may have been responsible for this change in eruption style.

=== Historical activity ===
Records of activity at Tupungatito go back to 1646 but its eruption record is poorly known, owing to its inaccessible location. Sometimes, eruptions at Tupungatito were incorrectly attributed to Tupungato. With over 19 eruptions between 1829 and 1987, Tupungatito is one of the SVZ's most active volcanoes. The historical eruptions took place in the craters north of the caldera, and involved in total eight craters. The intensity of the eruptions did not exceed a Volcanic Explosivity Index of 2. Many eruptions appear to be linked to tectonic events in Central Chile.

In 1835, Charles Darwin in his diary mentioned a muleteer telling him that he had seen smoke coming from close to Tupungato although he crossed the Andes close to Portillo de los Piuquenes rather than the Alto Colorado; this is almost certainly a reference to Tupungatito. In 1962 the volcano was reportedly smoking.

Eruptions at Tupungatito frequently deposited volcanic ash in Mendoza. In 1958-1961 the volcano produced a 2 kilometres (1.2 mi) long lava flow in Chile and ash fall in San Martin, Argentina, 130 kilometres (81 mi) away. There is also evidence of ionospheric impacts from this eruption. The 1961 and 1964 eruptions formed one crater each, with the 1964 crater located directly south of the 1961 one. A third crater was the site of the three last eruptions in 1980, 1986 and 1987. The 1986 eruption deposited a thin ash layer over glaciers in the area. The last activity took place in 1987. (Note: A 1987 landslide in the region generated a mudflow down the Rio Colorado, which killed 41 people and damaged roads, hydropower plants and water supply infrastructure of Santiago, is unrelated to Tupungatito and a seismic trigger is questionable.)

=== Present-day status and threats ===
The volcano is fumarolically active in four craters, the fumaroles mainly emit steam at temperatures of 81–84 °C (178–183 °F). Gas bubbling has been observed in the crater lakes. The crater lakes and/or fumaroles are visible in satellite images, where they appear as temperature anomalies. The gases come from the magma, ultimately from the downgoing slab, and as they ascend they interact and mix with an overlying aquifer and a hydrothermal system. There is also shallow seismicity around the volcano.

Since 2012, the volcano is monitored by the Southern Volcanological Observatory of the Andes, and Argentina was planning to install monitoring equipment as of 2025. Intense eruptions could melt the ice on the volcano through the emission of incandescent rocks and pyroclastic flows, producing medium-sized or long lahars in the Quebrada de Tupungatito and Estero del Azufre valleys. Pyroclastic fallout from high eruption columns would most likely occur in Argentina. Future eruptions will most likely be small or medium-sized Strombolian eruptions. The nearest towns in Chile are El Alfalfal, El Manzano and Los Maitenes and in Argentina La Consulta, San Carlos, Tunuyan and Tupungato. For Argentina, it is the 4th most dangerous volcano, and for Chile, the 22nd most dangerous volcano. Due to a combination between its relative proximity to population centres, high volume of ice and frequency of eruptions, a 2020 study ranked it the 4th most dangerous volcano on Earth in terms of lava-ice interactions. Eruptions may also endanger tourists.

== See also ==
- List of volcanoes in Argentina
- List of volcanoes in Chile

== Bibliography ==
- Bertin, D.; Silva, C.; Kraus, S.; Orozco, G. (2013). Geología del volcán Tupungatito. Región Metropolitana de Santiago (Report). Carta Geológica de Chile, Serie Geología Básica (in Spanish). Vol. 369 (1 ed.). Servicio Nacional de Geología y Minería.
