= Stuart Vines =

British mountaineer, 2nd ascent aconcagua, 1st ascent Tupungato

Stuart Vines F.R.G.S.
- Born: Walter Stuart Menteth Vines; 22 April 1867; Birmingham, United Kingdom
- Died: 7 April 1922 (aged 54); Torquay, United Kingdom
- Education: St John's College, Oxford
- Occupations: Mountaineer, Geologist
- Known for: Second ascent of Aconcagua, first ascent of Tupungato

Walter Stuart Menteth Vines (4 April 1867 – 7 April 1922) was a British mountaineer, alpinist, and a geologist, who climbed the Alps and Andes at the end of the 19th century, known for his ascents in the Andes.

== Mountaineering ==
In 1893, he ascended to the summit of Piz Roseg and in 1895 the Piz Morteratsch in the Alps.

On 9 November 1896, he arrived in Buenos Aires, to join an expedition into the Andes led by Edward FitzGerald, which also included mountaineers Matthias Zurbriggen and Nicola Lanti, which left Buenos Aires for Mendoza on 29 November. During this expedition, he became the second person to reach the summit of Aconcagua after Zurbriggen. On 13 February 1897, he and Lanti reached the summit, leaving a note and some tools behind. Following the summit of Aconcagua, Vines made the ascent of Cerro Catedral, a mountain on the western of the Horcones Valley together with the brothers Joseph and Louis Pollinger. Later that same year, the expedition moved on towards the Tupungato volcano to summit it. On April 12 1897, on their 4th attempt, Vine and Matthias Zurbriggen successfully made the first ascent.

On his return to Europe, Vines published about his summits and the scientific findings made alongside the climb. On May 5, 1897, Vines' The Ascent of Aconcagua and Tupungato was read in the Alpine Club in London, the text of which was later published in The Alpine Journal in the November 1899 edition. In 1898, Vines was inducted into the Alpine Club by members Edward FitzGerald and William Martin Conway, where he remained a member until 1904.

He also contributed chapters to FitzGerald's book about the expedition, The highest Andes; a record of the first ascent of Aconcagua and Tupungato in Argentina, and the exploration of the surrounding valleys, which was published in 1899.

== Personal life ==
Vines was closely related to the Stuart-Menteth baronets. He studied at Rossall and St John's College, Oxford, he was awarded a BA in 1892. He was trained as a surveyor and participated in the Boer War between 1900 and 1901. Following the war, he worked as a surveyor in various regions of Africa.
