= Tupungato =

Mountain in Argentina

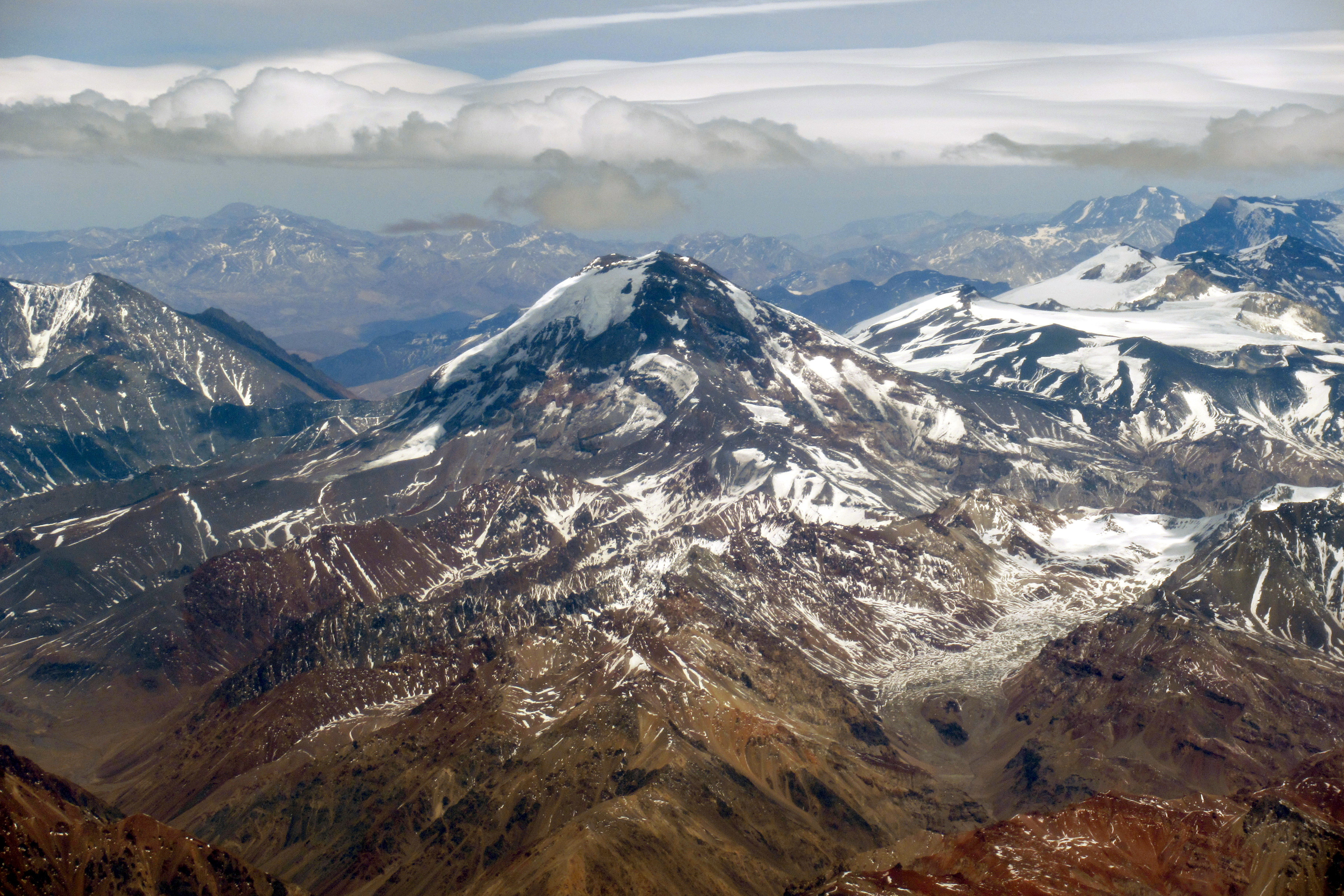
- Aerial view of Tupungato volcano from Argentina.

Highest point
- Elevation: 6,570 m (21,560 ft) (Note: The given elevation of 6,570 m (21,560 ft) comes from Chilean 1:50.000 topographic mapping and is in accordance with SRTM data; the frequently given elevation of 6,800 m (22,300 ft) is incorrect.)
- Prominence: 2,765 m (9,072 ft)
- Listing: Ultra
- Coordinates: 33°21′30″S 69°46′12″W

Geography
- Location within Argentina
- Location: Mendoza Province, Argentina – Metropolitan Region, Chile
- Parent range: Principal Cordillera, Andes

Geology
- Rock age: Pleistocene
- Mountain type: Lava dome
- Volcanic zone: South Volcanic Zone
- Last eruption: 0.8 million years ago.

Climbing
- First ascent: 1897 by Matthias Zurbriggen and Stuart Vines

Tupungato, one of the highest mountains in the Americas, is a massive Andean lava dome dating to Pleistocene times. It lies on the Argentina–Chile border, between the Chilean Metropolitan Region (near a major international highway about 80 km or 50 mi east of Santiago) and the Argentine province of Mendoza, about 100 km (60 mi) south of Aconcagua, the highest peak of both the Southern and Western hemispheres. Immediately to its southwest is the active Tupungatito volcano (literally, little Tupungato), which last erupted in 1987.

Tupungato Department, an important Argentine wine-producing region in Mendoza province, is named for the volcano. Recent Chilean mapping indicates it has a summit elevation of 6635 m.

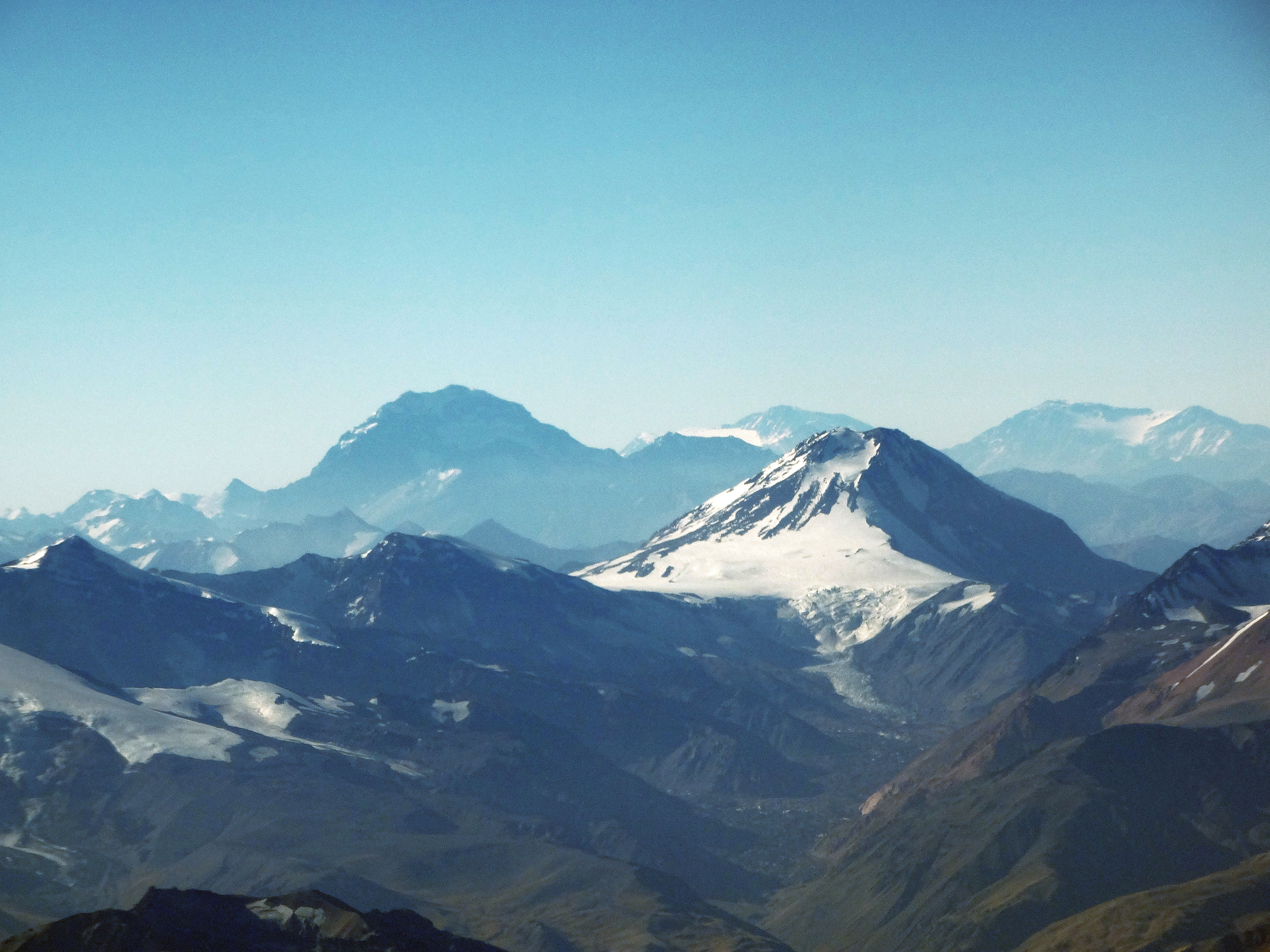
Tupungato volcano seen from south. Mount Aconcagua in the background.

== 1947 plane crash ==
On 2 August 1947, the airliner Star Dust, an Avro Lancastrian carrying six passengers and five crew over the Andes range, crashed into a steep glacier high on the Argentine side of Tupungato. The plane was quickly buried in the resulting avalanche and heavy snowfall that was taking place at the time. The plane lay undetected deep beneath the snow and glacial ice for over 50 years. Its remnants finally re-emerged at the glacier terminus in 2000. Shortly thereafter, an Argentine army expedition discovered the scattered debris and wreckage, collecting some of the evidence for investigation.

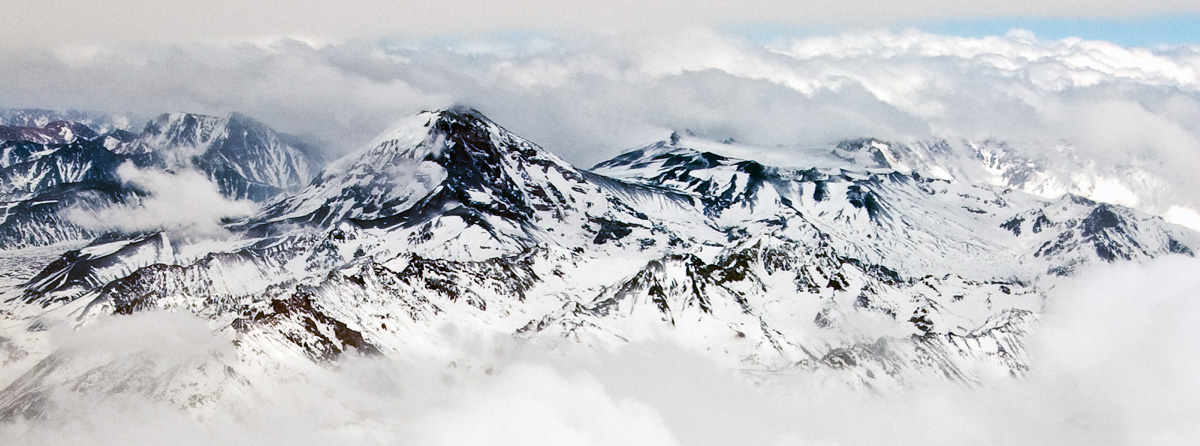
Aerial view of Tupungato (center-left) and Tupungatito.

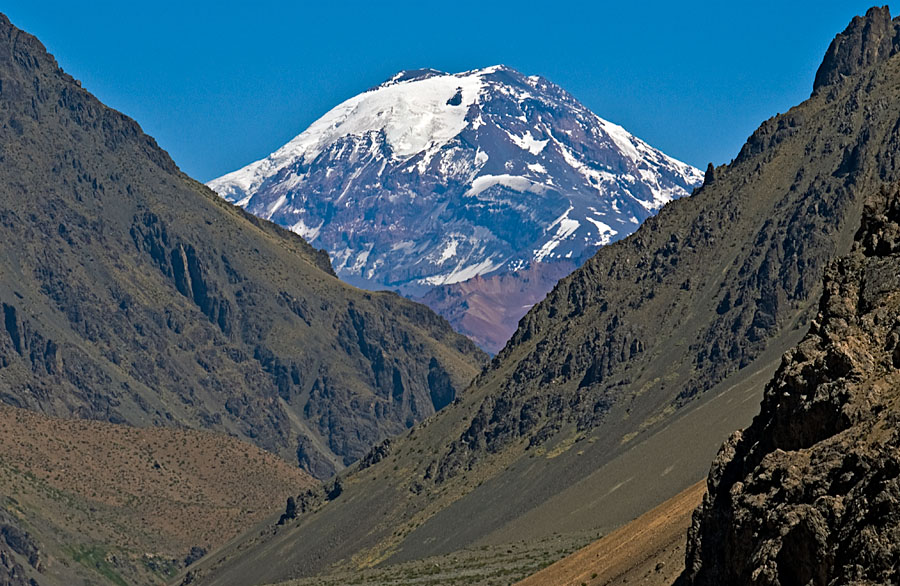
Tupungato volcano seen from Punta de Vacas, Argentina.

== Climbing ==
The first ascent of Tupungato was achieved during a 4th attempt on April 12 1897 by the mountaineers Matthias Zurbriggen and Stuart Vines. In January 1985, Argentine climbers Guillermo Viero and Leonardo Rabal were the first to attempt an ascent from the more challenging eastern side of the mountain. During this attempt, both climbers lost their lives and their bodies were found and recovered by fellow climbers. In 2024, Viero's backpack was found on Tupungato by mountaineer Gabriela Cavallaro, who found a Super 8 camera with material providing proof that Viero and Rabal had succeeded in their ascent. In February 2025, Cavallaro and two of Viero's sisters set out on an expedition to retrieve the backpack as part of an expedition.

== See also ==
- Incapillo
- List of volcanoes in Argentina
- List of volcanoes in Chile
- List of mountains in the Andes
- List of Ultras of South America
- 1947 BSAA Avro Lancastrian Star Dust accident
