= Miguel Doura =

Miguel Doura was born in 1962 in the province of Buenos Aires, Argentina, where he studied fine arts at the school Prilidiano Pueyrredón, standing out in his talks and meetings with his teacher, the sculptor Rubén Locazo (Grand National Sculpture Prize). For years he worked as an art photographer and his images appeared on Argentine and foreign publications illustrating postcards, calendars, magazines and books on different subjects.

== Style and subject ==
His painting highlights a typically Fauvist style filled with color, a constant exercise of complementary colors. He mostly uses oil pastel as a medium of expression, but also highlights his work in graphite or hyperrealism in oil. His work explores the human figure as the large planes of color. Despite being recognized as "The Painter of the Aconcagua", the theme of his work is varied but almost always related to the landscape, be it mountain, sea or forest. He has painted both in Ushuaia (Argentina) the southernmost city in the world, at the North Cape of Norway as well as on the summit of Mt.Aconcagua. Doura has expressed that he feels a "post-impressionist" but in the 21st century.

== Reception and achievements ==
In 2010 he was invited to paint and exhibit in the Netherlands, where the local critics described his work as a "flamboyant style clearly reminiscent of Vincent van Gogh".

He was also invited to perform work for the Museum of Latin American Art of Amersfoort (LAKMA).

His restless and curious nature led him to start his own art gallery, called "Nautilus" at 4300 meters at the base camp "Plaza de Mulas" Mt Aconcagua (the highest mountain in the West).

This has earned him recognition from the Guinness World Records as "The Gallery of Contemporary Art highest World". Guinness World Records

and have been recognized Cultural Interests in Las Heras, Mendoza (Argentina).

In 2012 he was called to perform work for the Russian Nobel Prize for Peace Vladimir Kotlyakov passing through Argentina.

His works are in private collections throughout the world, as well as interviews and notes have been published by various media around the world highlighting by the National Geographic Channel.NatGeo

== Patagonian etymological theory ==
He has also introduced a new hypothesis about the origin of the name Patagonia Patagónia which has earned him a scientific publication.
