= Tyler Armstrong =

American mountain climber (born 2004)

- Born: Tyler Robert Armstrong; January 22, 2004 (age 22); Yorba Linda, California, U.S.
- Occupation: Mountain climber
- Years active: 2011–present
- Known for: Youngest at Mount Whitney; 2nd Youngest at Mount Kilimanjaro; Youngest at Aconcagua
- Website: topwithtyler.com

Tyler Robert Armstrong (born January 22, 2004) is an American mountain climber who became the youngest person to climb Aconcagua in Argentina at the age of 9.

== Mountaineering career ==
=== Beginning ===
Armstrong started his career as mountain climber at the age of 6 after watching a documentary about hiking. After finding out that the youngest person that ever climbed Mount Whitney was 9 years, Armstrong started to train every day and soon started to climb his first mountains.

=== Expeditions ===
==== Mount Whitney (July 26, 2011) – 14,495 feet ====
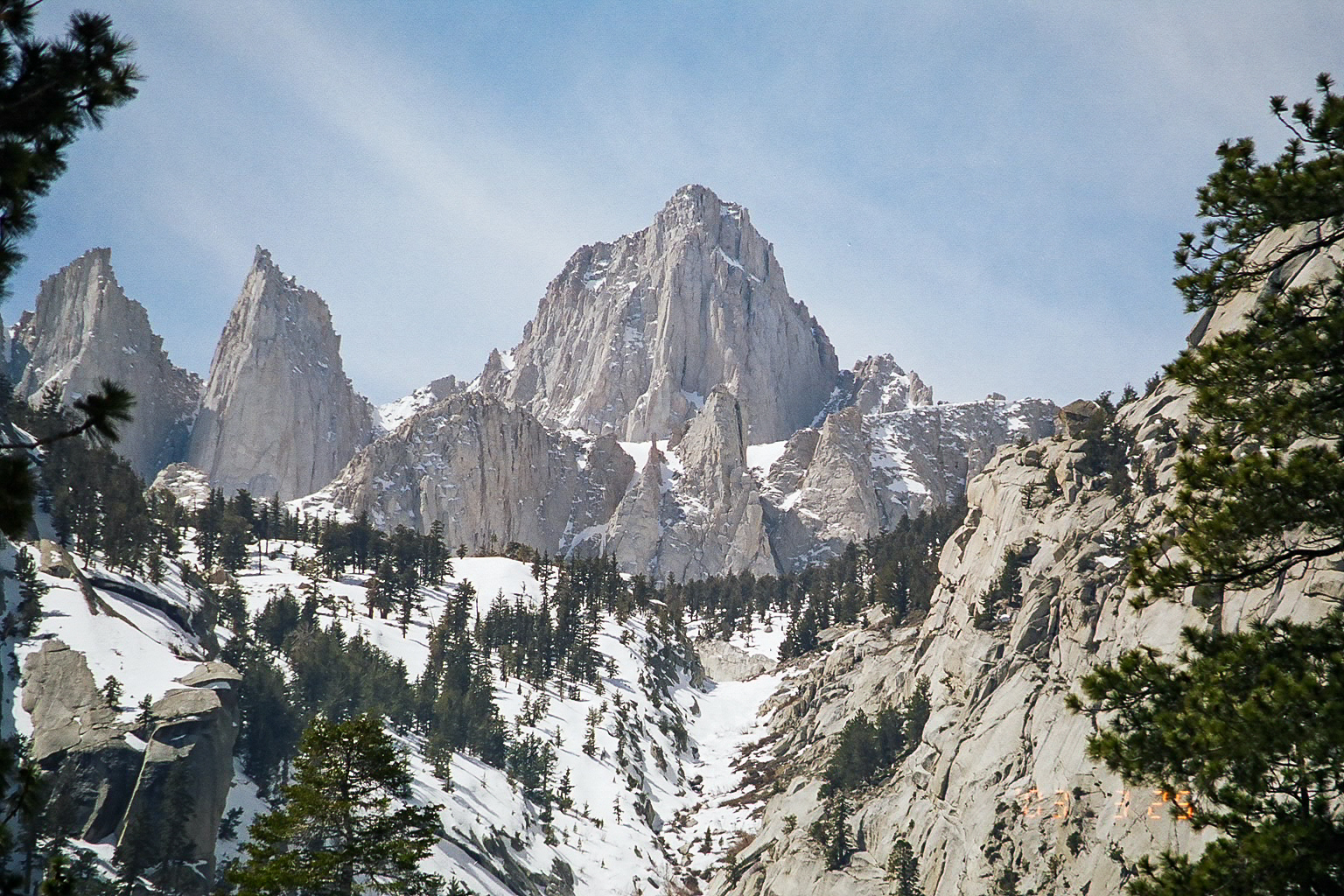
Mount Whitney is the highest in the lower 48

Armstrong climbed Mount Whitney in a single day on July 26, 2011. At 7 years old, he might be the youngest boy to climb the mountain, with a 6-year-old girl, summiting in 2018. and later in 2019 twins aged 4 years 5 months old. Starting at the base camp, his 11-mile hike to the top, with an elevation gain of more than 6000 feet, took him 7 hours and 50 minutes.

==== Aconcagua (December 24, 2013) – 22,837 feet ====
In 2013 Armstrong climbed Aconcagua. As a training exercise, he climbed Mount Baldy on August 17, 2013, as part of the fifth annual Climb to Cure Duchenne. After obtaining a special permit, Armstrong started his climb on December 15, taking the Polish Glacier Traverse Route. On December 24, 2013, Armstrong reached the top and broke the record for being the youngest person to climb Aconcagua, at the age of 9.

==== Denali (June 2016) — 20,310 ft (6190 m) ====
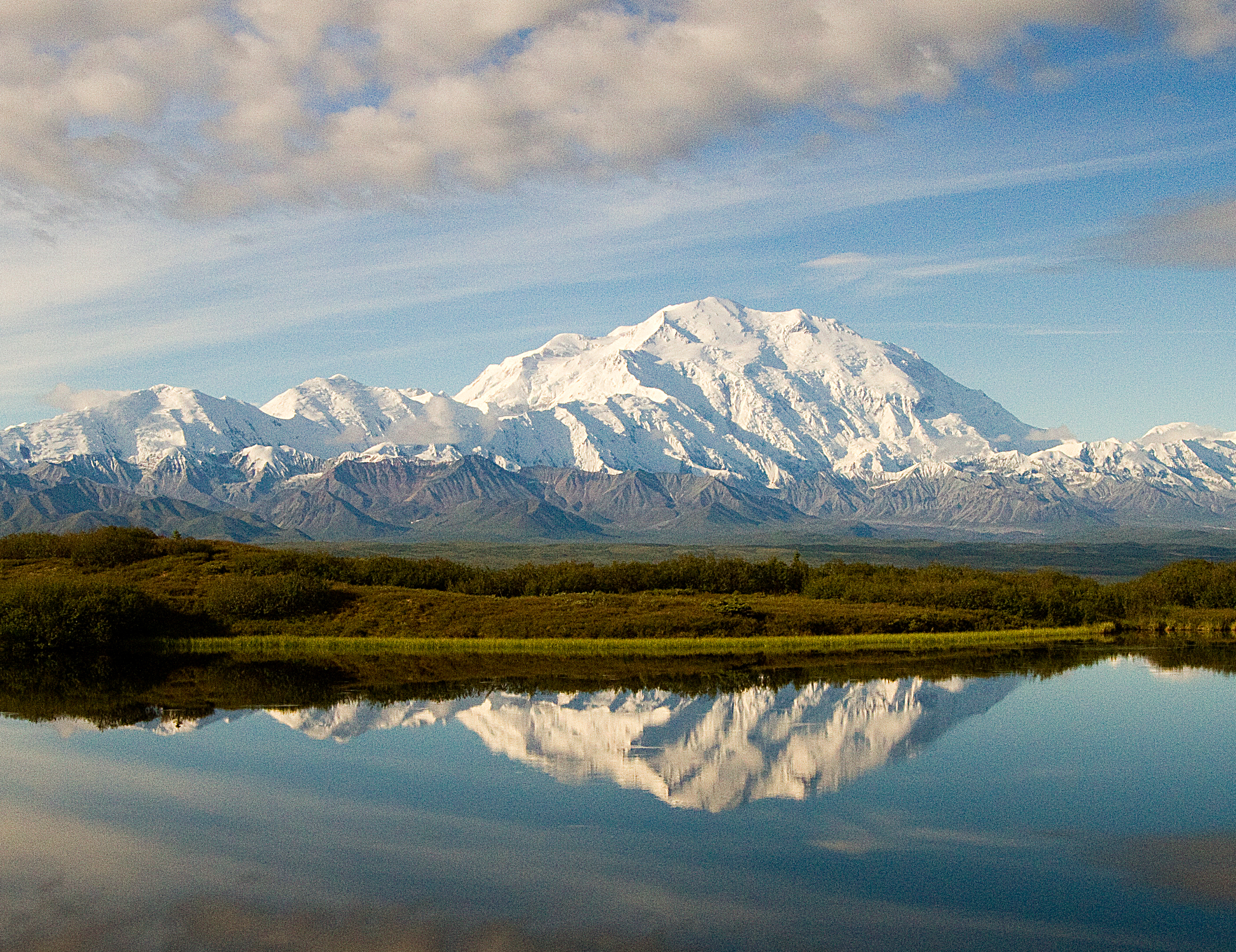
Denali with Wonder Lake in the foreground

At the age of 12, Tyler was denied a permit to climb Everest in the spring of 2016. Instead, he climbed Denali, reaching the summit in June 2016.

=== Mountains climbed ===
- Denali (20,310 ft)
- Aconcagua (22,837 ft.)
- Mount Kilimanjaro (19,341 ft.)
- Mount Whitney (14,495 ft.)

=== Duchenne muscular dystrophy awareness ===
When Armstrong was climbing Mount Whitney with his parents, he met a boy with Duchenne muscular dystrophy. Armstrong subsequently partnered with the CureDuchenne Foundation to raise money and awareness for the disease. By the summer of 2016 he had raised $25,000 out of a goal of one million dollars.

In addition to climbing he also hosted a special fund-raising movie presentation of Everest, with proceeds going to CureDuchenne foundation.

== Personal life ==
Armstrong lives in Yorba Linda, California, with his father Kevin, mother Priscilla, and brother Dylan. He likes playing his guitar, soccer, flag football, video games, swimming, laser tag and is a member of the Boy Scouts.
