= Aconcagua =

Highest mountain in the Americas

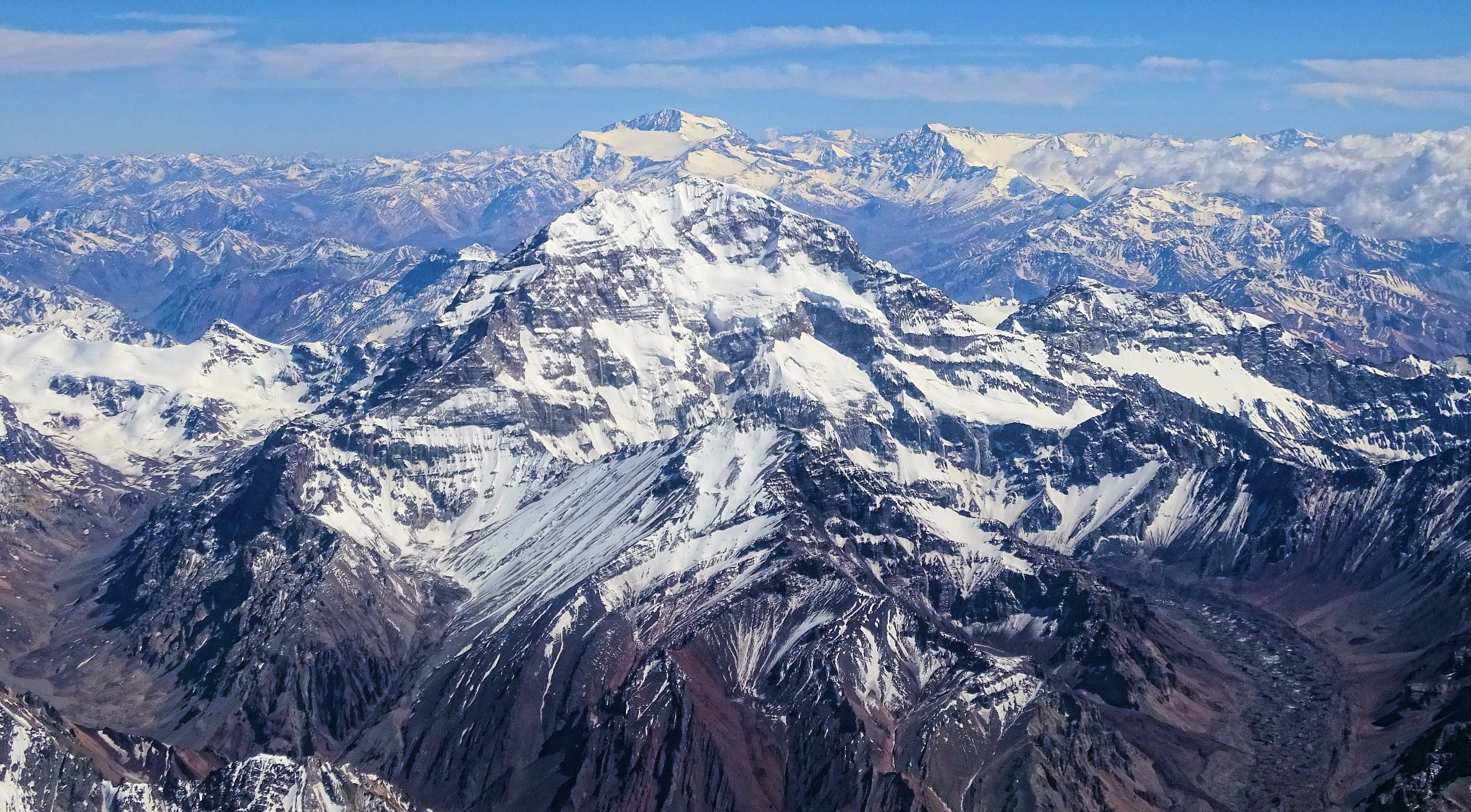
- Aconcagua from the south

Highest point
- Elevation: 6,967.16 m (22,858.1 ft); Ranked 189th
- Prominence: 6,967.16 m (22,858.1 ft); Ranked 2nd
- Parent peak: None – Highest peak in the Americas
- Isolation: 16,533.4 km (10,273.4 mi)
- Listing: Seven Summits; Country high point; Ultra; World's most isolated peaks 2nd
- Coordinates: 32°39′11″S 70°00′42″W

Naming
- Pronunciation: Spanish: [akoŋˈkaɣwa] /ˌækənˈkɑːɡwə/ or /ˌɑːkənˈkɑːɡwə/

Geography
- Location within Argentina
- Country: Argentina
- Province: Mendoza
- Parent range: Principal Cordillera, Andes

Climbing
- First ascent: 1897 by Matthias Zurbriggen (first recorded ascent)
- Easiest route: Scramble (Northwest)

Aconcagua (Spanish pronunciation: [akoŋˈkaɣwa]) is a mountain in the Principal Cordillera of the Andes range, located in Mendoza Province, Argentina. With a summit elevation of 6,967.15 metres (22,858.1 feet), it is the highest mountain outside Asia. It is the second-most topographically prominent peak in the world and one of the Seven Summits, the highest mountains on each of the seven continents.

The mountain lies 112 kilometres (70 mi) northwest of Mendoza, approximately 15 kilometres (9.3 mi) from the Argentine–Chilean border. It is bounded by the Vacas Valley to the north and east and the Horcones Inferior Valley to the west and south, and is protected within Aconcagua Provincial Park. Several glaciers descend its flanks, the largest being the Horcones Inferior glacier (Ventisquero Horcones Inferior), at roughly 10 kilometres (6.2 mi) long.

Aconcagua was formed by the subduction of the Nazca Plate beneath the South American Plate and was once an active stratovolcano, before tectonic shifts during the Miocene halted volcanic activity. The first recorded ascent was made on 14 January 1897 by Swiss guide Matthias Zurbriggen, as part of a British expedition led by Edward FitzGerald.

From the north via the normal route, Aconcagua is considered technically straightforward and is often described as the highest non-technical mountain in the world, requiring no ropes or specialized equipment. Nevertheless, the extreme altitude—where atmospheric pressure is roughly 40% of sea level—means altitude sickness affects most climbers, and the mountain records approximately three deaths per year, earning it the nickname "Mountain of Death." Summit success rates are estimated at 30–40%.

== Etymology ==
The origin of the name is uncertain. It may be from the Mapudungun Aconca-Hue, which refers to the Aconcagua River and means "comes from the other side"; the Quechua Ackon Cahuak, meaning "Sentinel of Stone"; the Quechua Anco Cahuac, meaning "White Sentinel"; or the Aymara Janq'u Q'awa, meaning "White Ravine".

== Geologic history ==
The mountain was created by the subduction of the Nazca Plate beneath the South American Plate. Aconcagua used to be an active stratovolcano (from the Late Cretaceous or Early Paleocene through the Miocene) and consisted of several volcanic complexes on the edge of a basin with a shallow sea. However, sometime in the Miocene, about 8 to 10 million years ago, the subduction angle started to decrease, resulting in a stop of the melting and more horizontal stresses between the oceanic plate and the continent, causing the thrust faults that lifted Aconcagua off its volcanic root. Volcanic activity ceased a long time ago. The rocks on Aconcagua's flanks are all volcanic and consist of lavas, breccias and pyroclastics. The shallow marine basin had already formed earlier (Triassic), even before Aconcagua arose as a volcano. However, volcanism has been present in this region for as long as this basin was around and volcanic deposits interfinger with marine deposits throughout the sequence. The colorful greenish, bluish and grey deposits seen in the Horcones Valley and south of Puente Del Inca, are carbonates, limestones, turbidites and evaporates that filled this basin. The red-colored rocks are intrusions, cinder deposits and conglomerates of volcanic origin.

== Climbing ==
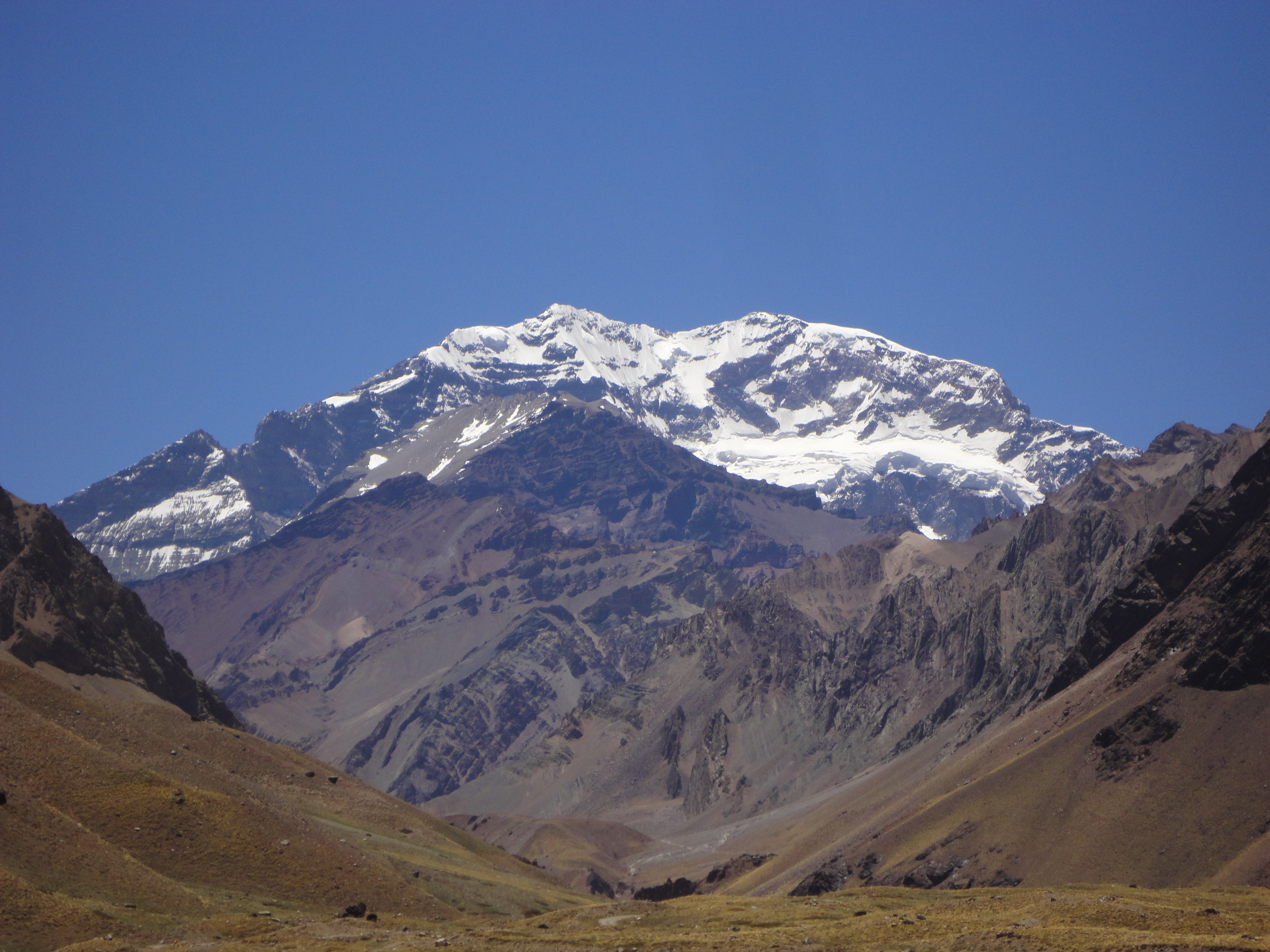
Aconcagua from the park entrance

In mountaineering terms, Aconcagua is technically an easy mountain if approached from the north, via the normal route. Aconcagua is arguably the highest non-technical mountain in the world since the northern route does not absolutely require ropes, axes, and pins. Although the effects of altitude are severe (atmospheric pressure is 40% of sea level at the summit), the use of supplemental oxygen is not common. Altitude sickness will affect most climbers to some extent, depending on the degree of acclimatization. Although the normal climb is technically easy, multiple casualties occur every year on this mountain (in January 2009 alone, five climbers died). This is due to the large numbers of climbers who attempt the ascent and because many climbers underestimate the significant risk posed by the elevation and cold weather. Given the weather conditions close to the summit, hypothermia is very common.

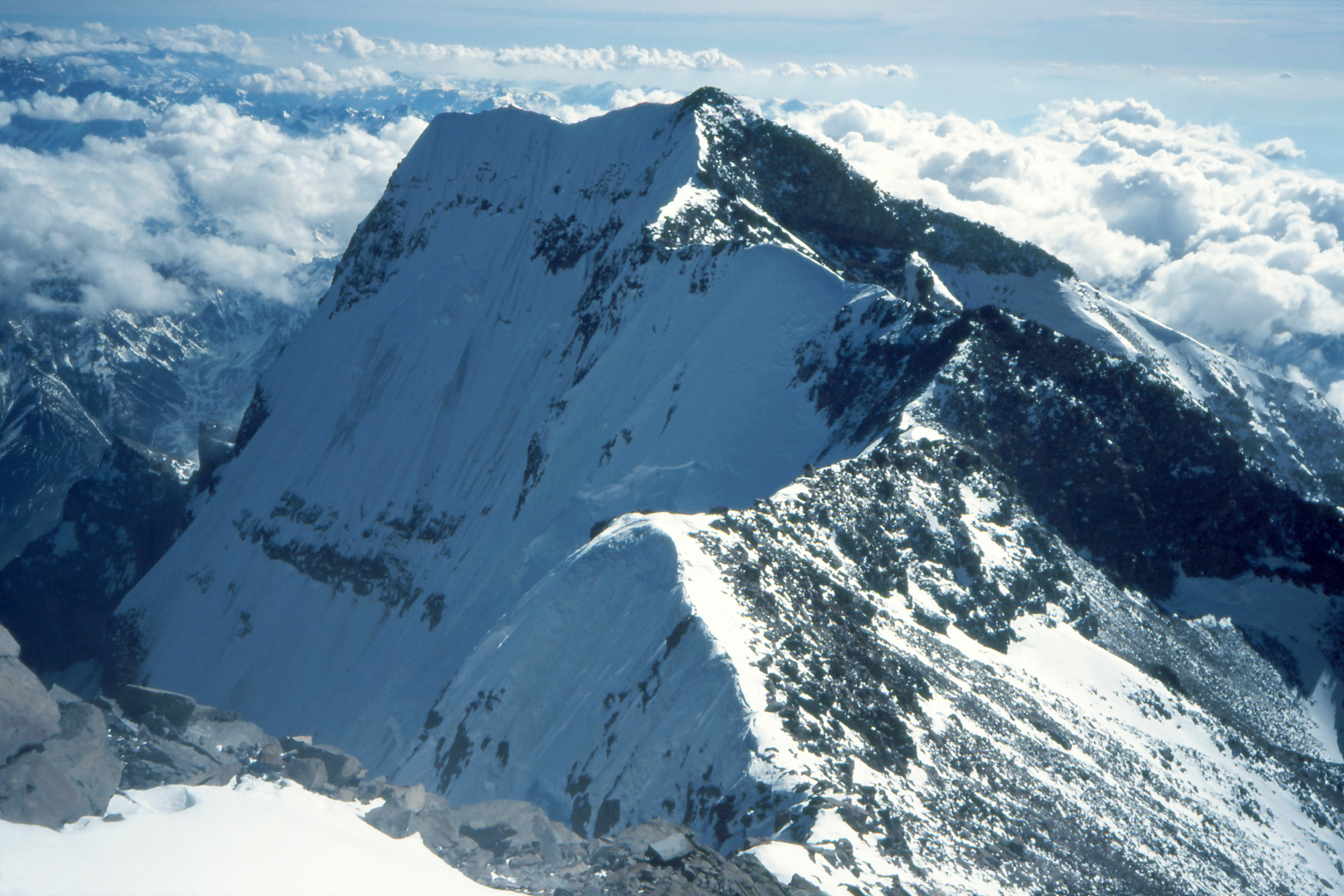
South summit and ridge

The routes to the peak from the south and south-west ridges are more demanding and the south face climb is considered quite difficult. The Polish Glacier Traverse route, also known as the "Falso de los Polacos" route, crosses through the Vacas valley, ascends to the base of the Polish Glacier, then traverses across to the normal route for the final ascent to the summit. The third most popular route is by the Polish Glacier itself.

Provincial Park rangers do not maintain records of successful summits but estimates suggest a summit rate of 30–40%. About 75% of climbers are foreigners and 25% are Argentinean. Among foreigners, the United States leads in the number of climbers, followed by Germany and the United Kingdom. About 54% of climbers ascend the Normal Route, 43% up the Polish Glacier Traverse Route, and the remaining 3% on other routes.

=== Camps ===
The campsites on the normal route are listed below (elevations are approximate).

- Puente del Inca, 2,740 metres (8,990 ft): A small village on the main road, with facilities including a lodge.
- Confluencia, 3,380 metres (11,090 ft): A camp site a few hours into the national park.
- Plaza de Mulas, 4,370 metres (14,340 ft): Base camp, claimed to be the second largest in the world (after Everest). There are several meal tents, showers and internet access. There is a lodge approximately 1 kilometre (0.62 mi) from the main campsite across the glacier. At this camp, climbers are screened by a medical team to check if they are fit enough to continue the climb.
- Camp Canadá, 5,050 metres (16,570 ft): A large ledge overlooking Plaza de Mulas.
- Camp Alaska, 5,200 metres (17,060 ft): Called 'change of slope' in Spanish, a small site as the slope from Plaza de Mulas to Nido de Cóndores lessens. Not commonly used.
- Nido de Cóndores, 5,570 metres (18,270 ft): A large plateau with extensive views. There is usually a park ranger camped here.
- Camp Berlín, 5,940 metres (19,490 ft): The classic high camp, offering reasonable wind protection.
- Camp Colera, 6,000 metres (19,690 ft): A larger, while slightly more exposed, camp situated directly at the north ridge near Camp Berlín, with growing popularity. In January 2011, a shelter was opened in Camp Colera for exclusive use in cases of emergency. The shelter is named Elena after Italian climber Elena Senin, who died in January 2009 shortly after reaching the summit, and whose family donated the shelter.
- Several sites possible for camping or bivouac, including Piedras Blancas (~6100 m) and Independencia (~6350 m), are located above Colera; however, they are seldom used and offer little protection.

Summit attempts are usually made from a high camp at either Berlín or Colera, or from the lower camp at Nido de Cóndores.

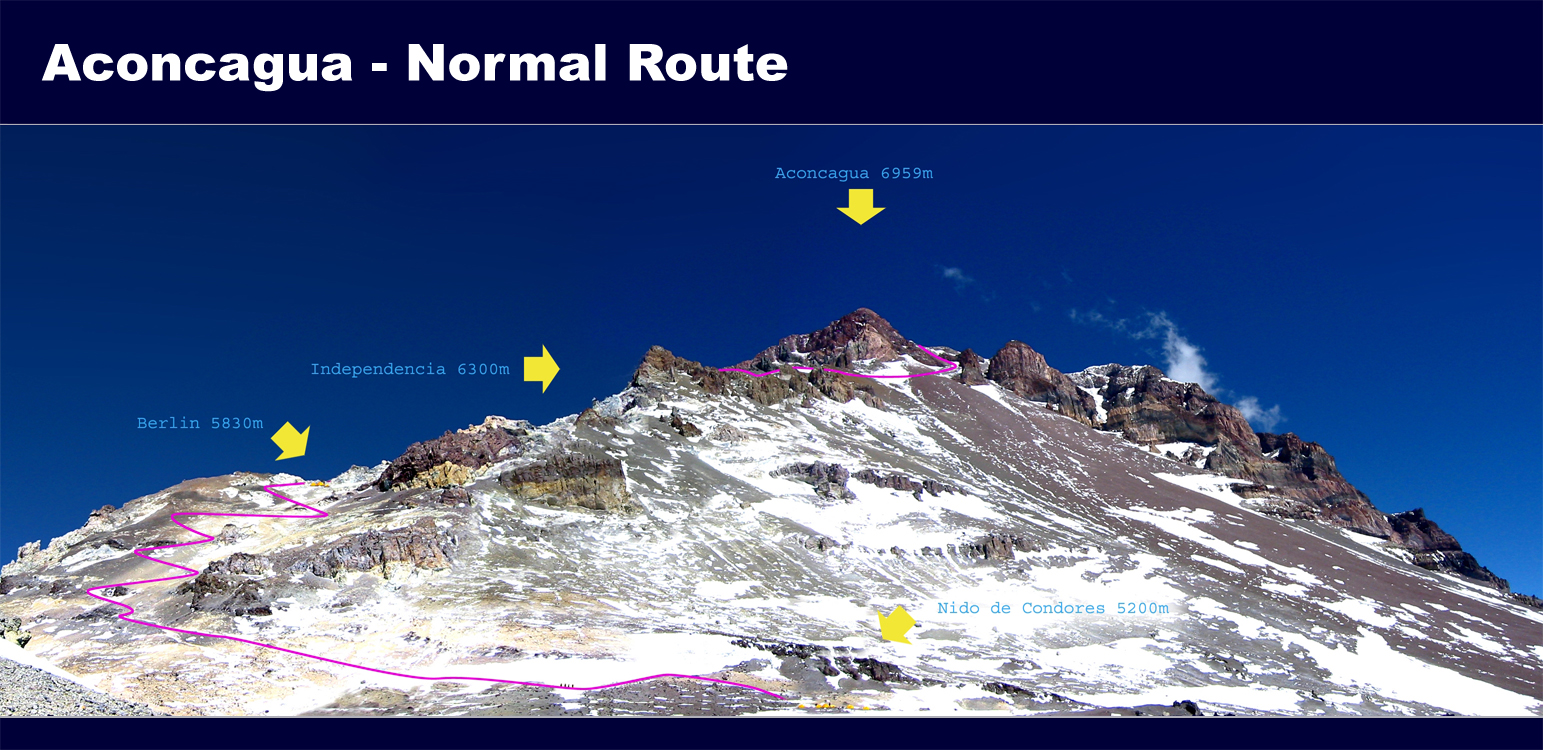
Normal route to the summit

=== History ===
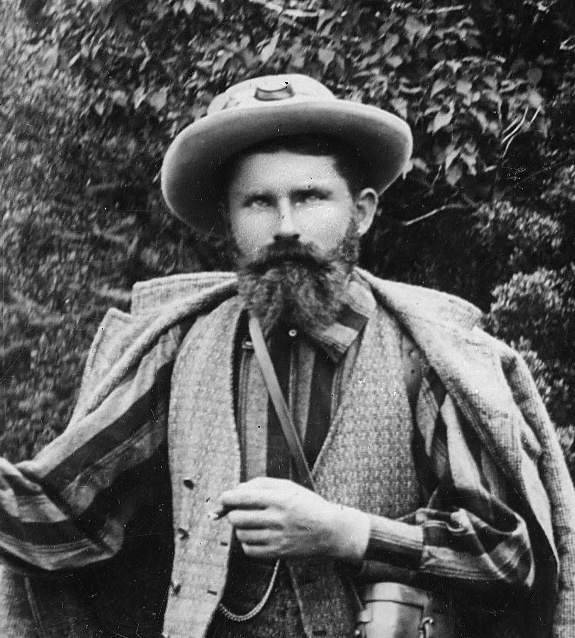
Matthias Zurbriggen reached the summit in 1897.

The first attempt to summit Aconcagua by Europeans was made in 1883 by a party led by the German geologist and explorer Paul Güssfeldt. Bribing porters with the story of treasure on the mountain, he approached the mountain via the Rio Volcan, making two attempts on the peak by the northwest ridge and reaching an elevation of 6,500 metres (21,300 ft). The route that he prospected is now the standard route up the mountain.

The first recorded ascent was in 1897 by a European expedition led by the American mountaineer Edward FitzGerald. FitzGerald failed to reach the summit himself over eight attempts between December 1896 and February 1897, but the (Swiss) guide of the expedition, Matthias Zurbriggen, reached the summit on 14 January. On the final attempt a month later, two other expedition members, Stuart Vines and Nicola Lanti, reached the summit on 13 February.

The east side of Aconcagua was first scaled by a Polish expedition, with Konstanty Narkiewicz-Jodko, Stefan Daszyński, Wiktor Ostrowski and Stefan Osiecki summiting on 8 March 1934, over what is now known as the Polish Glacier. A route over the Southwest Ridge was pioneered over seven days in January 1953 by the Swiss-Argentine team of Frederico and Dorly Marmillod, Francisco Ibanez and Fernando Grajales. The famously difficult South Face was conquered by a French team led by René Ferlet. Pierre Lesueur, Adrien Dagory, Robert Paragot, Edmond Denis, Lucien Berardini and Guy Poulet reached the summit after a month of effort on 25 February 1954.

As of 2020 the youngest person to reach the summit of Aconcagua is Tyler Armstrong of California. He was nine years old when he reached the summit on 24 December 2013. Kaamya Karthikeyan of India at an age of 12 became the youngest girl to reach the summit on 1 February 2020. The oldest person to climb it was Scott Lewis, who reached the summit on 26 November 2007, when he was 87 years old.

In the base camp Plaza de Mulas (at 4,300 m (14,100 ft) above sea level) there is the highest contemporary art gallery tent called "Nautilus" of the Argentine painter Miguel Doura.

In 2014, Kilian Jornet set a record for climbing and descending Aconcagua from Horcones in 12 hours and 49 minutes. The record was broken less than two months later by Ecuadorian-Swiss Karl Egloff, in a time of 11 hours 52 minutes, nearly an hour faster than Kilian Jornet. This record was broken by American Tyler Andrews in 2023, with a time of 11 hours and 24 minutes. In 2016, Fernanda Maciel set the first women's record for climbing and descending Aconcagua from Horcones in 22 hours, 52 minutes. The current women's record is held by Ecuadorean Daniela Sandoval at 20 hours, 17 minutes.

On January 23, 2019, the Cholita climbers were the first Indigenous, Aymara women to climb the mountain in traditional clothing. Their climb was sponsored by the Ministry of Culture and Tourism of Bolivia and the expedition is now detailed in a documentary film called 'Cholitas'.

On 25 September 2019, an Airbus Helicopters H145 landed on the very peak of Mount Aconcagua. This is the first time in history a twin-engine helicopter has landed at this altitude. It took a total of 45 minutes for the entire trip, 30 minutes from Mendoza and another 15 from the base camp up to the peak. Temperatures were reported as low as −22 °C (−8 °F), with wind gusts up to 30 kn (56 km/h; 35 mph). This is not the highest a helicopter has landed before, as a single-engine Airbus Helicopters H125 landed on Mount Everest, the highest mountain in the world.

=== Dangers ===
At nearly 7,000 m (23,000 ft), Aconcagua is the highest peak outside Asia. It is believed to have the highest death rate of any mountain in South America — around three a year — which has earned it the nickname "Mountain of Death". More than 100 people have died on Aconcagua since records began.

Due to the improper disposal of human waste in the mountain environment there are significant health hazards that pose a threat to both animals and human beings. Only boiled or chemically treated water is acceptable for drinking. Additionally, ecofriendly toilets are available only to members of an organized expedition, meaning climbers have to "be contracted to a toilet service" at the base camp and similar camps along the route. As of 2015, from two base camps (Plaza de Mulas and Plaza Argentina), over 120 barrels of waste (approx. 22,500 kg (49,600 lb)) are flown out by helicopter each season. In addition, individual mountaineers must make a payment before using these toilets. Some large organizers will charge up to US$ 100, while smaller ones may charge US$ 5 per day or US$ 10 for the entire stay; thus, many independent mountaineers choose to defecate on the mountainside.

== Mythological meaning ==
For the Incas, Aconcagua was a sacred mountain. As on other mountains (e.g. Ampato), places of worship were built here and sacrifices, including human sacrifices, were made. The sites discovered in 1985 at an elevation of 5167 m are among the highest in the world and are the most difficult of all Inca sites to reach. Here, the remains of a child bedded on grass, cloth and feathers were found inside stone walls (Aconcagua mummy). The clothing indicates that the child was a member of the highest social class. Other offerings found included figures and coca leaves.

== See also ==
- Aconcagua mummy
- Ojos del Salado

== Bibliography ==
- Biggar, John (2005). The Andes: A Guide for Climbers (3 ed.). Scotland: Andes Publishing. ISBN 978-0-9536087-2-0.
- Darack, Ed (2001). Wild Winds: Adventures in the Highest Andes. Cordee / DPP. ISBN 978-1884980817.
