= Matthias Zurbriggen =

Swiss mountaineer (1856–1917)

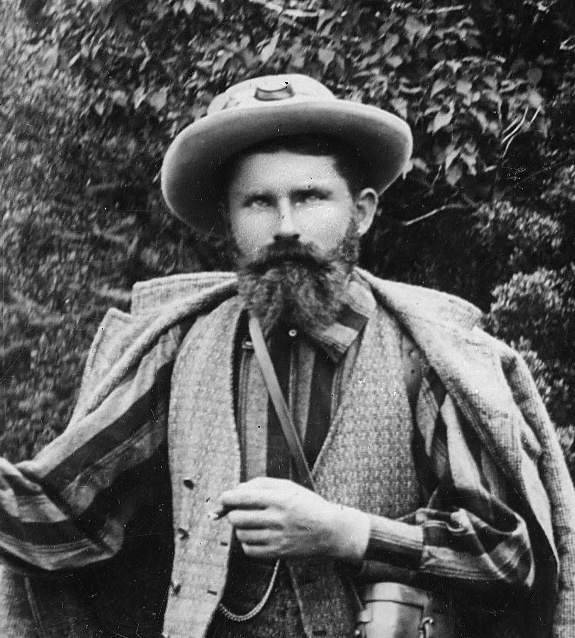
- Zurbriggen in 1895
- Born: Matthias Zurbriggen; May 15, 1856; Saas-Fee, Switzerland
- Died: June 21, 1917 (aged 61); Geneva, Switzerland
- Occupation: Mountaineer
- Known for: First ascent of Aconcagua and Tupungato

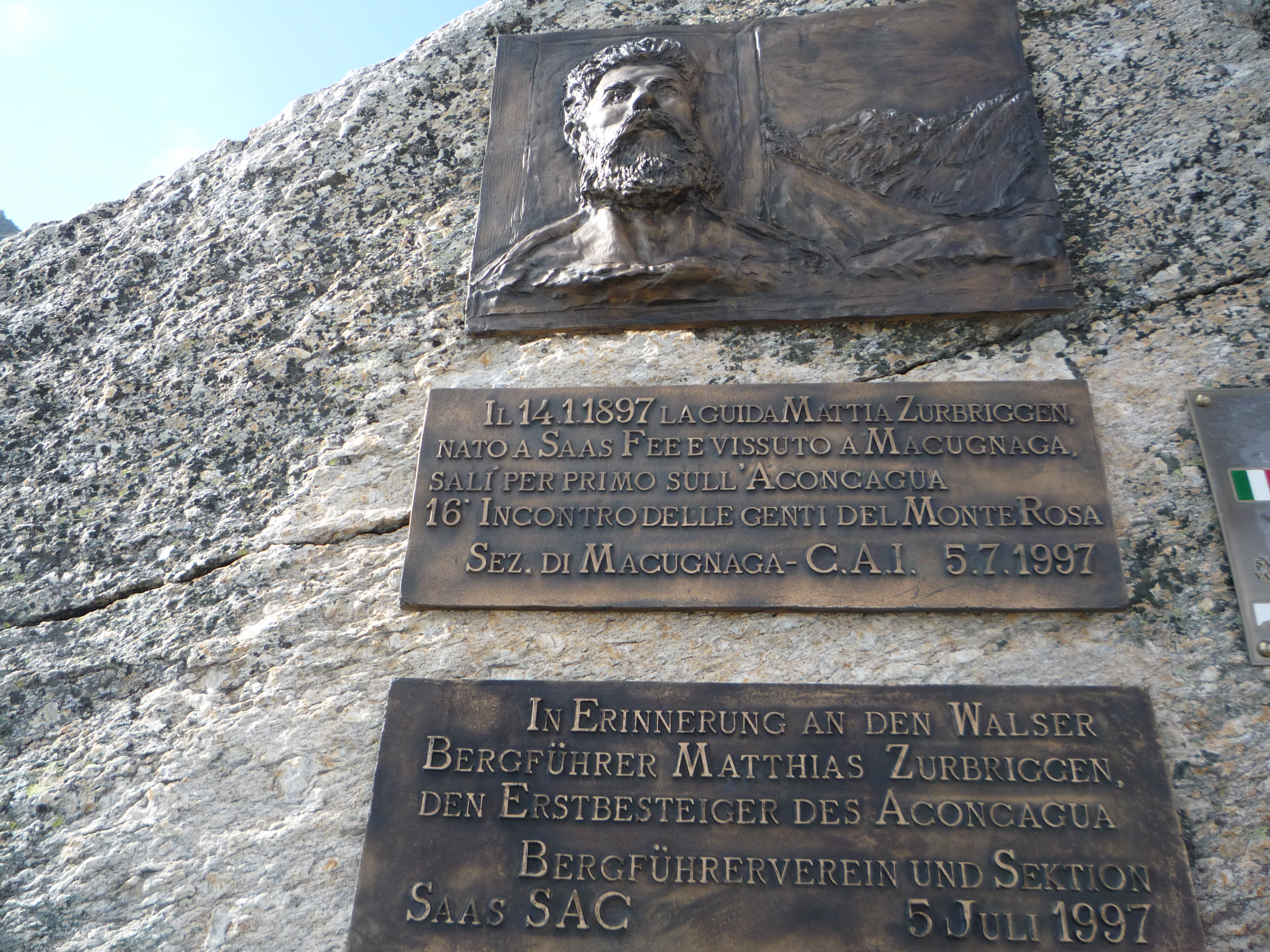
Memorial to Matthias Zurbriggen, Monte Moro Pass, on the border between Italy and Switzerland

Matthias Zurbriggen (15 May 1856 in Saas-Fee – 21 June 1917 in Geneva) was a Swiss mountaineer. He climbed throughout the Alps, the Andes, the Himalayas and New Zealand.

== Ascents ==
He made many first ascents, the best known of which is Aconcagua in Argentina, the highest peak outside of Asia, which he climbed alone on 14 January 1897, during an expedition led by Edward FitzGerald. During the same expedition Zurbriggen also made the first ascent of Tupungato with Englishman Stuart Vines.

He went with Martin Conway on his expedition to the Karakoram in 1892. He accompanied Charles Granville Bruce and Conway when they attempted Baltoro Kangri, on 25 August they reached a subsidiary summit which they named Pioneer Peak. The barometer showed a height of 22,600 feet (6,888 m) which Conway optimistically rounded up to 23,000 feet (7,010 m) . However, Pioneer Peak has since been measured at only 6,501 metres (21,329 ft).

The Zurbriggen Ridge on Aoraki / Mount Cook in New Zealand is named after him. On 14 March 1895, Zurbriggen made the first ascent of the ridge, the second ascent of the mountain and its first solo ascent. He missed the honour of claiming the first ascent of Mount Cook, which was achieved a few months earlier, on Christmas Day 1894 by a party of New Zealanders who were determined to prevent the first ascent being credited to a foreigner.

Fanny Bullock Workman and her husband engaged him as a guide for two of their Himalayan/Karakoram expeditions: in 1899 and 1902. They explored the Biafo Glacier and the unclimbed peaks around it.

Between the Workman expeditions he accompanied the Italian Prince Scipione Borghese on his trip to the Tian Shan in 1900 for an attempt on Khan Tengri. They passed through the northern regions of modern Kyrgyzstan, explored the Engilchek Valley and ascended a number of lower peaks but were unable to reach Khan Tengri.

== Personal life ==
His memoirs, From the Alps to the Andes: Being the Autobiography of a Mountain Guide, were published in 1899.

Later in life, his fortune declined. He lived his last decade in Geneva, as a vagrant in his home country, and was found hanged in Geneva in 1917, an apparent suicide.
