= Polaco =

Polaco is surname of:

- Jorge Polaco (1946–2014), Argentine filmmaker
- Peter Polaco, better known as Justin Credible (born 1973), American wrestler
- Pico Polaco, a mountain in the Cordillera de la Ramada range of the Andes of Argentina
- Lito & Polaco, Rafael Sierra (Lito) (born 1979) and Rafael Omar Polaco Molina (Polaco) (born 1976)

== See also ==
- Idioma polaco
- Glaciar de los Polacos
- Polacco (Italian form)
- Polacca - a type of merchant sailing vessel
- Polaco (slur) - a Spanish derogatory term for a Catalan
