= 1930s Polish Andean expeditions =

Two expeditions of mountain climbers

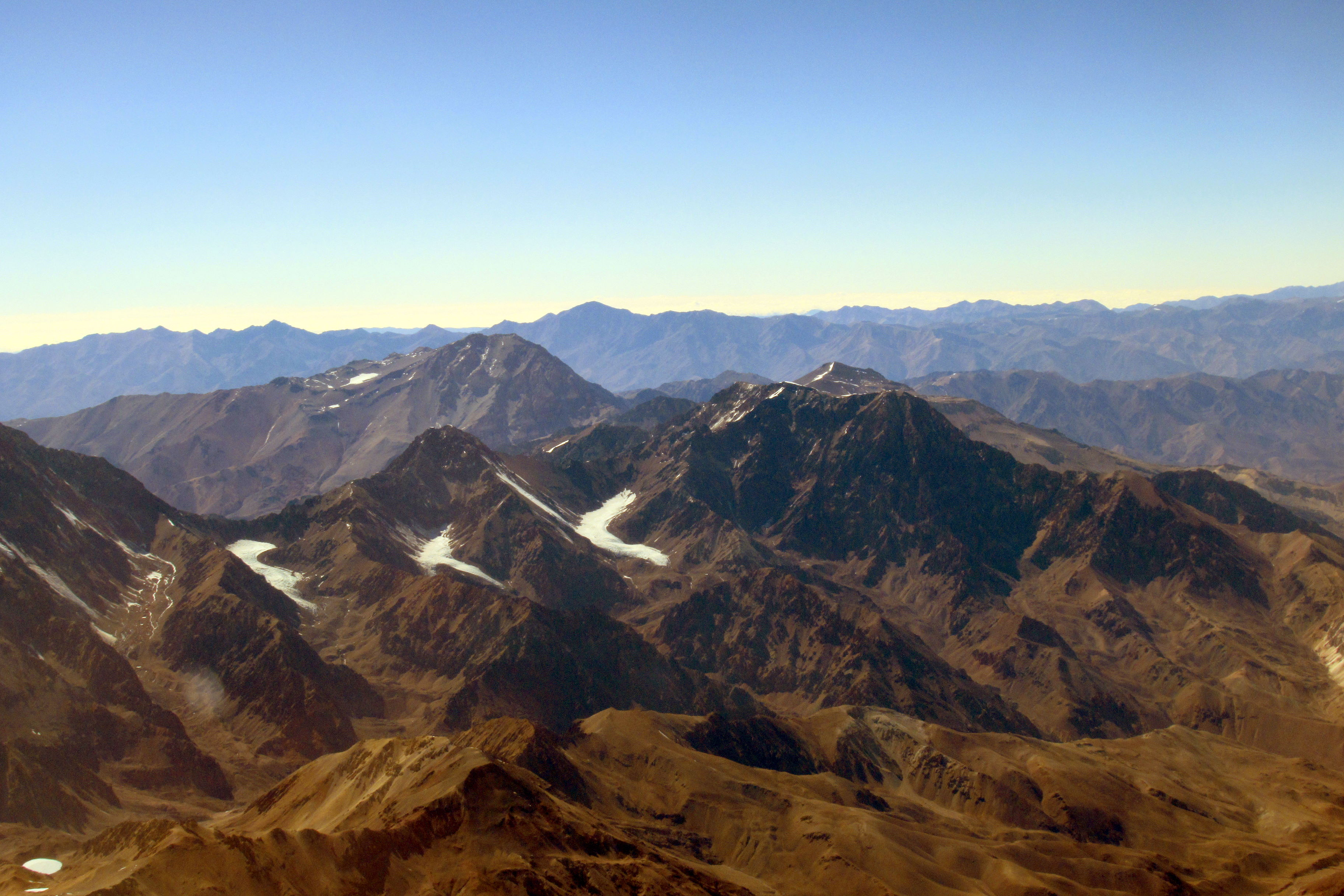
In the foreground from left to right: slopes of Mercedario, Pico Polaco, La Mesa. In the background, from left to right, Cerro Ramada and the faintly visible peak of Alma Negra

Polish Andean expeditions of the 1930s refers to the two expeditions of Polish mountain climbers in the Andes carried out in the 1930s.

The First Polish Andean Expedition of 1933-34 was led by Konstanty Narkiewicz-Jodka. Its achievements included several first ascents of six-thousanders - first ascents of Mercedario and Cerro Ramada, ascents to La Mesa, Alma Negra, and the discovery of Pico Polaco (6050 m), as well as ascents to five-thousanders - including Cerro Negro (5550 m) and exploration of the Aconcagua region; the latter involved pioneering a new climbing route.

The Second Polish Andean Expedition of 1936-37 was led by Justyn Wojsznis. Its achievements included the first ascents of Ojos del Salado and Nevado Pissis.

Both expeditions have been credited with gathering scientific data and have led to a number of literary works being produced (such as autobiographical memoirs).

== First Polish Andean Expedition ==
The First Polish Andean Expedition of 1933–1934 to the Argentinian region of the Cordillera de la Ramada was also the first Polish organized mountaineering and research expedition (Poland regained independence in 1918 in the aftermath of the First World War). The expedition gained worldwide fame.

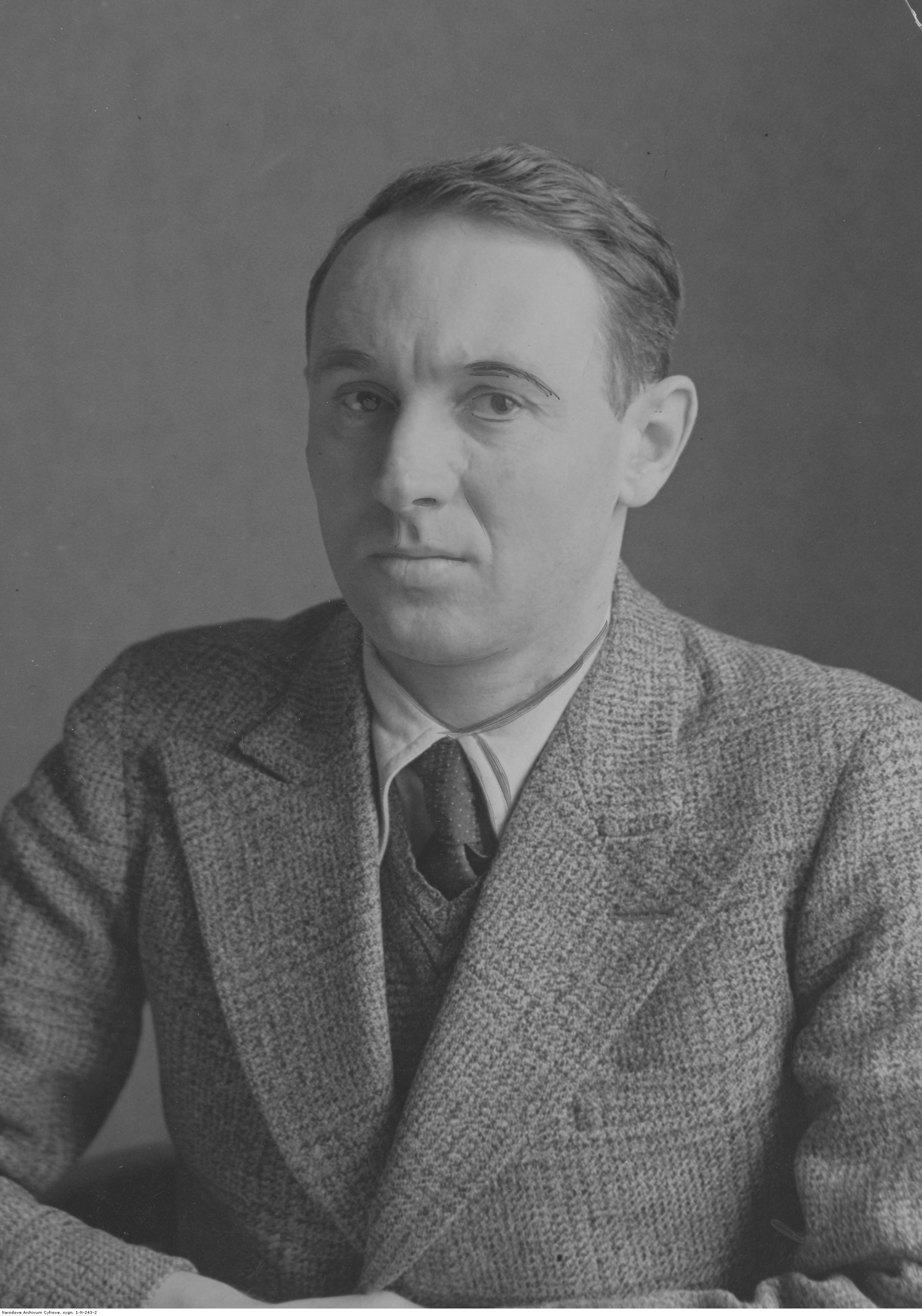
Konstanty Jodko-Narkiewicz, leader of the first expedition, in 1936

Expeditions members included: Konstanty Narkiewicz-Jodko (physicist and leader of the expedition), Stefan Daszyński (engineer and geologist), Jan Kazimierz Dorawski (medical doctor), Adam Karpiński (aircraft designer), Stefan Osiecki (architect and painter) and Wiktor Ostrowski (an engineer).

During the expedition, the participants climbed the following peaks (chronologically):

January 3, 1934: Trabante I (4860 m above sea level; Dorawski and Karpiński)

January 9.: Trabante II (5300 m above sea level; Narkiewicz-Jodko and Ostrowski)

January 16: Pilar Grande (6000 m above sea level; Karpiński)

January 18: Mercedario (6720 m above sea level; Karpiński, Ostrowski, Daszyński and Osiecki - it was the first ascent of this peak in history)

January 26: Cerro Wanda (5271 m above sea level; Karpiński and Dorawski - a then-unknown peak, named by Polish explorers, also known in English as "Wanda Peak")

January 27: Cerro Negro (5550 m above sea level; Dorawski, Karpiński, Ostrowski)

February 9: Alma Negra (6110 m above sea level; Dorawski and Ostrowski)

February 10: La Mesa (6150 m above sea level; Dorawski and Ostrowski)

c. February 10: Cerro Ramada (6410 m above sea level; Narkiewicz-Jodko – first ascent)

March 8: Aconcagua (6960 m above sea level - the highest peak of the Andes, South America and all of America; Ostrowski, Daszyński, Osiecki, Narkiewicz-Jodko; new eastern road; the so-called "Polish Route" or "Ruta de los Polacos" near the Polish Glacier).

Other successes of the expedition include the discovery of a six-thousander, called Cerro N by Polish explorers, but not conquered until 1958. or 1962 (the first ascent was done by an expedition from Argentina; the Argentine geographers changed the name to Pico Polaco to honor the Polish first attempt). Similarly, in honor of the Polish explorers, the glaciers flowing down from Mercedario later received the names: Glacier Ostrowski and Glacier Karpiński (Glaciar Karpiński and Glaciar Ostrowski ).

The expedition was also of scientific importance, in terms of geographical and geological exploration (including fields of tectonics and stratigraphy, paleontology and petrography), as well as meteorological observations. Dorawski's medical observations on the functioning of the human body in mountain conditions were also useful for the field of medicine.

== Second Polish Andean Expedition ==
The Second Polish Andean Expedition of 1936–1937, led by journalist and writer Justyn Wojsznis, took place in the Ojos del Salado region, on the Northern section of the border between Argentina and Chile. The participants of the expedition included, apart from Wojsznis: Stefan Osiecki (participant of the prior expedition), Witold Paryski (environmental activist) and Jan Alfred Szczepański (journalist).

During the expedition, the participants climbed the following peaks (chronologically):

January 18, 1937: Cerro de Los Patos (6,280 m above sea level; summit climbed by all participants)

February 4: Cerro del Nacimiento (Paryski reached the 6,330m south-west peak and Wojsznis the 6,493m north-west peak; the next day, Wojsznis also reached the 6,490m north-east peak)

February 7: Nevado Pissis (5950 m above sea level; Osiecki and Szczepański, first ascent; discovery of the mountain lake Laguna Negra)

same day: Cerro Sosa (approx. 5000 m above sea level; Wojsznis and Paryski)

same day: Volcán del Viento (6010 m above sea level; Wojsznis)

February 24: Nevado Tres Cruces (6620 m above sea level; Osiecki and Paryski - climbers first reached the middle summit; two days later Paryski reached the southern summit alone)

February 26: Ojos del Salado (6870 m above sea level; Szczepański and Wojsznis - first ascent of this peak)

March 11: Volcan de Copiapo (6052 m above sea level; Paryski and Szczepański)

Similar to the first expedition, the participants carried out a number of scientific studies, including a topographical sketch of an area of approximately 3,000 km^{2}. Paryski's medical observations, as well as Dorawski's observations from previous years, contributed to the enrichment of knowledge about climbers' acclimatization and altitude sickness. Some of the materials were however lost during World War II.

The successes of Poles were extensively described in the Argentine and Chilean press; a number of meetings were organized, including in Buenos Aires, La Plata, Montevideo and Santiago. A film shot during the expedition was also shown.

== Legacy ==
The activity of the Polish explorers in the region before World War II paved way to numerous subsequent expeditions after the war, during the times of Polish People's Republic and more recent.

=== In popular culture ===
Another effect of these expeditions was the creation of a collection of mostly Polish-language texts presenting the achievements of Polish climbers. Articles, as well as books, were published by participants of expeditions many years after their end. These publications took place both in specialist circles, e.g. in Polish mountaineering magazines such as Wierchy and Taternik (as well as in foreign languages, including English-language The Geographical Journal), and in forms more widely accessible to the public - such as through several autobiographical memoirs or narratives of expeditions, published by various Polish publishing houses (starting with books by Narkiewicz-Jodka, W walce o szczyty Andów, 1935; and Ostrowski's Na szczytach Kordyljerów. Wspomnienia z polskiej wyprawy naukowo-alpinistycznej w Kordyllera de los Andes from the same year, followed by Szczepański's Wyprawa do księżycowej ziemi, 1954; Paryski's W górach Atakamy, 1957; another book by Ostrowski, Wyżej niż kondory, 1959, and finally Dorawski's Pierwsza wyprawa w Andy, 1961).
