= Ramada (disambiguation) =

A ramada (shelter) is an open air shelter made of tree branches or thatch. It is typically a shade structure in hot, arid locales.

Ramada may also refer to:

== Hotels ==
- Ramada Worldwide, a hotel chain
- Ramada International, a company that owns, operates, and franchises hotels outside of the United States and Canada
- Ramada Jarvis, a former hotel chain in the United Kingdom

== Places ==
- Ramada, Tunisia, a town in Tunisia
- Ramada (Odivelas), a Portuguese parish in Odivelas municipality
- Cerro Ramada, a mountain in Argentina
- Cordillera de la Ramada, a mountain range of the Andes in Argentina
- Ramada Norte, a mountain in the Andes Mountains, Argentina
- Nova Ramada, a municipality in the state Rio Grande do Sul, Brazil
- Ramada (neighborhood), a neighborhood of Guaíba, Rio Grande do Sul, Brazil

== People ==
- Daniel Ramada, Uruguayan theologian and diplomat

== Music ==
- Ramada Inn, a song by Neil Young from Psychedelic Pill
- Ramada Inn, a song by Randy Stonehill from Until We Have Wings
- Rrramada, a song by Young Fathers from Tape One

== Zoology ==
- Liza ramada, scientific name of the thinlip mullet, a species of fish in the family Mugilidae
