= Konstanty Jodko-Narkiewicz =

Polish physicist

Konstanty Jodko-Narkiewicz, also known as Konstanty Narkiewicz-Jodko (1901–1963), was a Polish geophysicist who specialized in studying cosmic radiation. He was also a mountaineer, Arctic explorer, and balloonist.

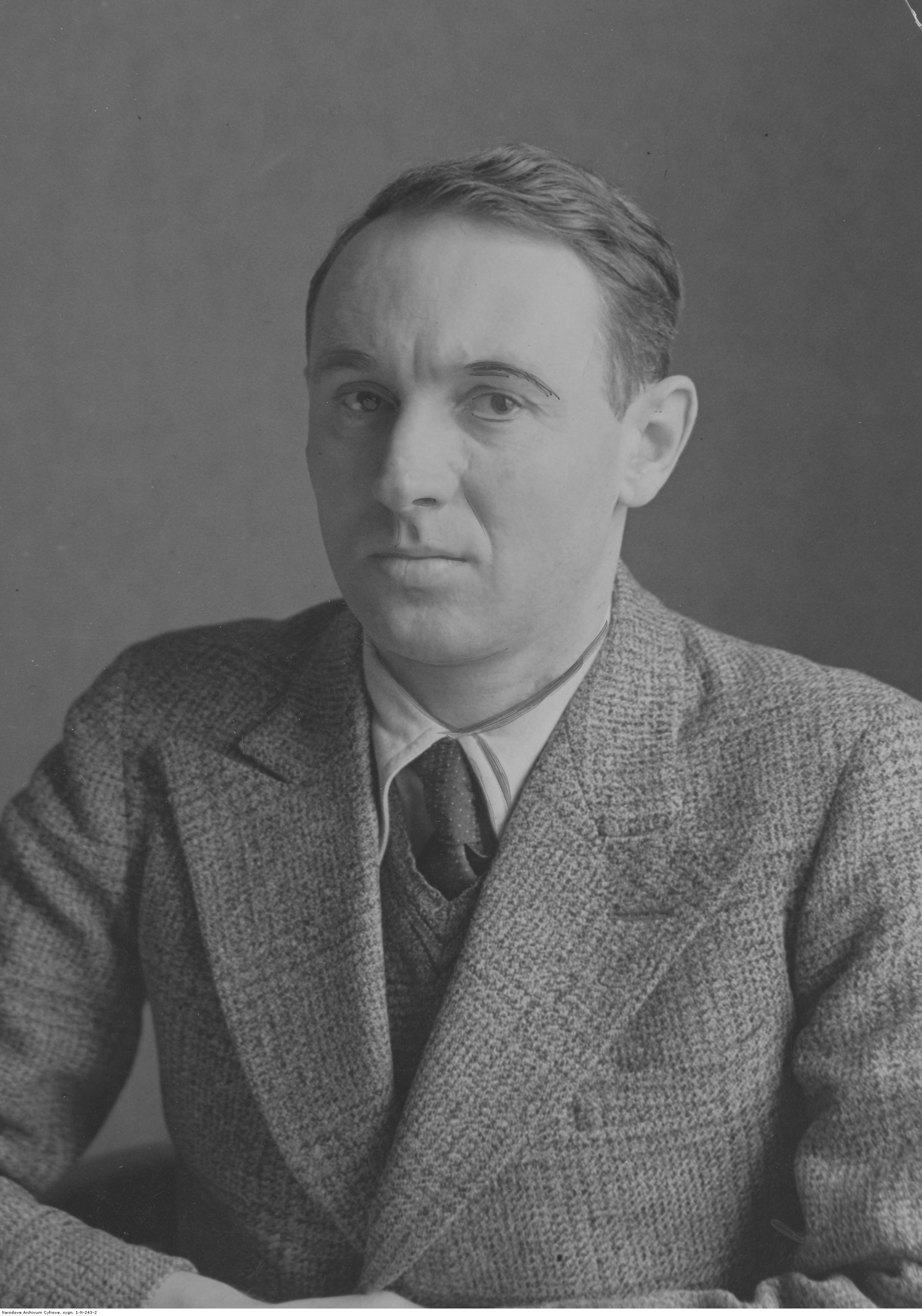
Konstanty Jodko-Narkiewicz

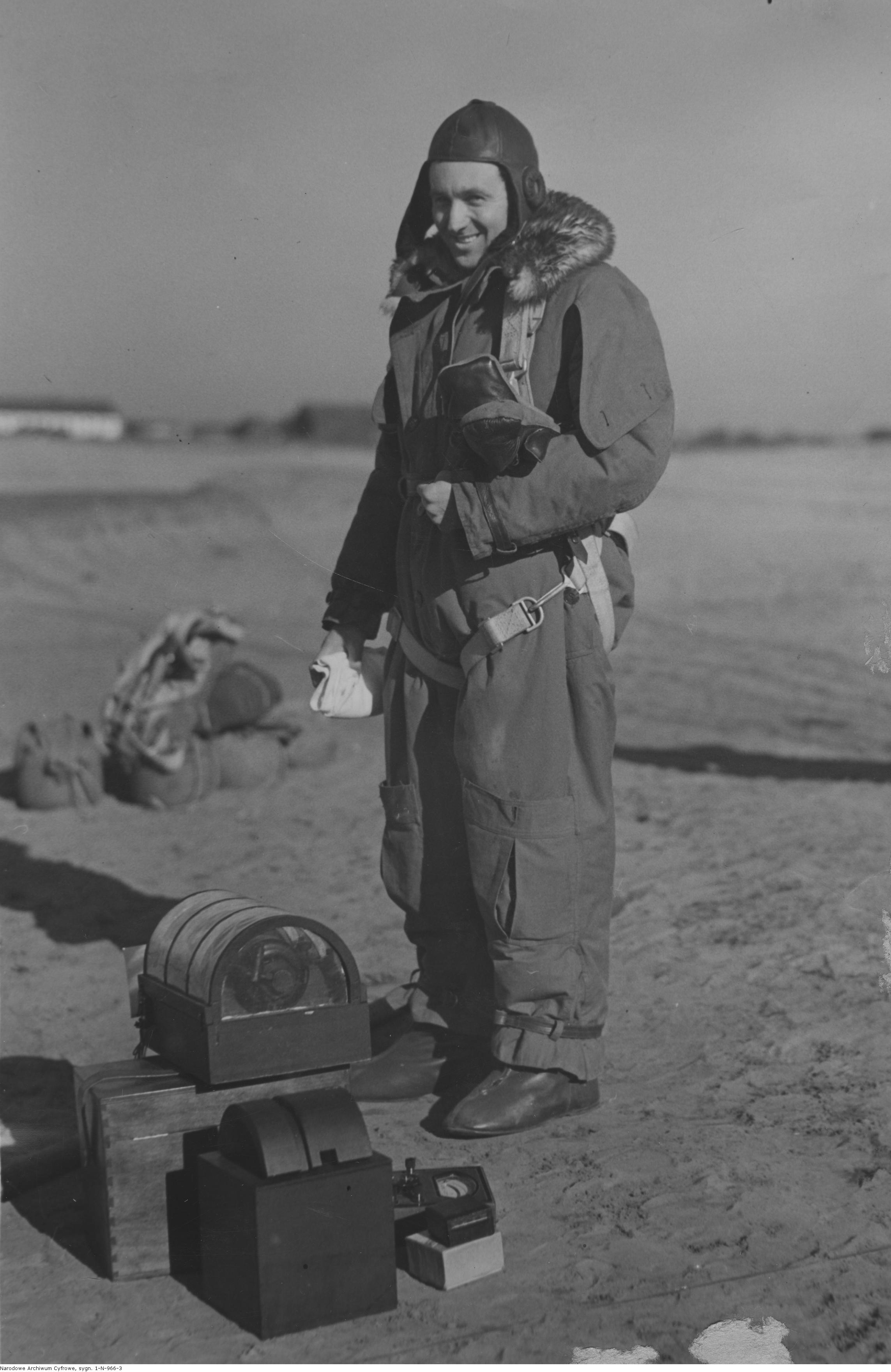
Konstanty Narkiewicz-Jodko before the balloon flight

== Geophysicist ==
Jodko-Narkiewicz trained in natural sciences and geography, gaining a doctorate in physics. Professionally he specialized in the study of cosmic radiation. In the 1930s, he was an assistant at the Physical Institute of Warsaw University.

He found a happy marriage between his career as a physicist and his interest in climbing. For instance, he combined a climbing expedition to the Andes in 1934 with a project to measure geomagnetic effects on cosmic rays.

Between 1933 and 1939, of the seventeen papers on cosmic-ray physics published in Poland, Jodko-Narkiewicz was author or co-author of twelve.

== Mountaineer ==
An experienced alpinist, Jodko-Narkiewicz also climbed mountains in Africa and Spitsbergen.

In 1929 he climbed the Iceland glacier Langjökull.

In 1933–1934 he led a Polish expedition organized by the Tatra Society to the Andes (the 1st Polish Andean Expedition), beginning with the Cordillera de la Ramada, a mountain range in Argentina. The party included Stefan W. Daszynski, Jan K. Dorawski, Wiktor Ostrowski, Adam Karpiński, meteorologist and equipment designer, and Stefan Osiecki, cameraman, and it made the first ascents of Mercedario, Alma Negra, Pico Polaco, La Mesa, and Cerro Ramada, then proceeded south to climb the better-known Aconcagua, the highest mountain in the Americas. The Polish Glacier of Aconcagua was named after this expedition, which originated an alternative route to the peak along the glacier.

In 1936, with Stanislaw Siedlecki and Stefan Bernadzikiewicz, he took part in a Polish expedition which crossed West Spitsbergen from south to north. Covering 850 kilometres, the three men made the first complete traverse of Spitsbergen.

== Balloonist ==
Considering his interests in cosmic rays and mountaineering, it was a natural development for Narkiewicz-Jodko to take to the skies as a balloonist. A high point in this area of his career came on March 29, 1936, when with a scientific colleague he succeeded in taking the balloon Warszawa II (Warsaw II) up to a height of 10,000 metres for the purpose of scientific measurements.

=== The Star of Poland incident ===
On 14 October 1938, in the Tatra Mountains, Jodko-Narkiewicz and Captain Zbigniew Burzyński attempted a stratospheric flight in the hydrogen balloon Star of Poland. Their aim was to reach a height of 30 kilometres, beating the world record for high-altitude flight. They were equipped with a Geiger-Mueller tube telescope, intending to measure the variation in intensity of cosmic rays at different altitudes. The balloon caught fire during take-off, while still less than 100 feet above the ground, but the two men were able to land the gondola safely and were uninjured.

After this, there were no more high-altitude flights in the 1930s.

Jodko-Narkiewicz died at Psary, in the region of Greater Poland, in 1963.

== Selected publications ==
- Konstanty Narkiewicz-Jodko, W walce o szczyty Andów [Battle for the Peaks of the Andes], Warsaw, 1935 (illustrated)
- Konstanty Narkiewicz-Jodko, 'Anregung der Strahlung einiger Metalle durch Quecksilberdampf im Zustand des Nachleuchtens', in Physikalische Berichte, vol. 10 (1929), 1650
- Dr S. L. Ziemecki & Mr K. Narkiewicz-Jodko, 'The Raman-effect in the proximity of the critical point', in Philosophical Magazine (Taylor & Francis, 1930), pp. 299–306
- Konstanty Narkiewicz-Jodko, 'Nachleuchten im elektrisch erregten Hg- Dampf', in Physikalische Berichte, vol. 15, part 1 (1934), 630
- S. Ziemecki & K. Narkiewicz-Jodko, 'Continuous Variation of Cosmic Ray Intensity in the Higher Layers of the Troposphere', in Acad. Polonaise Sciences et Lettres, bulletin no. 7a (July, 1936), pp. 318–326
- K. Narkiewicz-Jodko, 'Specific Ionization Characteristic of Cosmic Rays', in Bulletin international: Sciences mathématiques (Kraków, 1938)
