= Gwiazda Polski =

Gwiazda Polski (The Star of Poland) was a balloon, which, according to the Polish planners, was going to reach the stratosphere, thus beating the 1930s high-altitude world record, established on November 11, 1935 by Albert William Stevens and Orvil Arson Anderson, in the Explorer II balloon. Stevens and Anderson ascended to the altitude of 22,066 m (72,395 feet), the Poles wanted to reach the altitude of 30 kilometers. Polish crew, consisting of Captain Zbigniew Burzynski and Doctor Konstanty Jodko-Narkiewicz, attempted the stratospheric flight in The Star of Poland on October 14, 1938 in the Tatra Mountains, but the balloon caught fire when it was less than 100 feet above the ground.

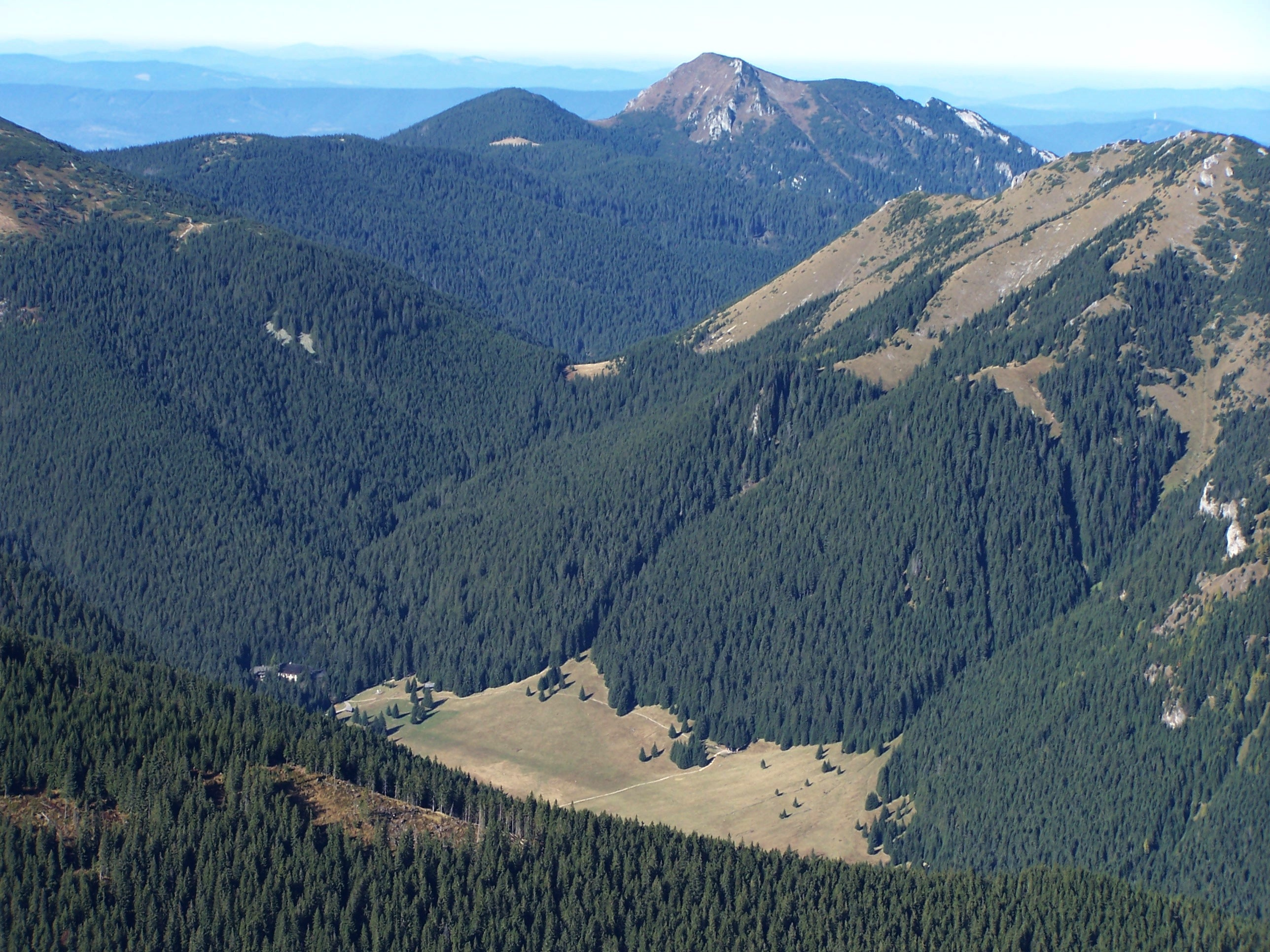
Chocholowska Valley in the Tatra Mountains, where the failed takeoff took place

== The idea ==
In mid-1930s, ballooning was a very popular sport in Poland, pilots from the Polish Aero Club, using equipment made by the renowned Balloon and Parachute Factory Aviotex (Wytwornia Balonow i Spadochronow Aviotex) from Legionowo won several awards during international competitions, including the Gordon Bennett Cup in ballooning, which the Poles won in 1933, 1934, 1935 and 1938.

The first idea of making a Polish flight into the stratosphere was conceived in 1937 by the military authorities, who wanted to beat the record, established two years earlier by Anderson and Stevens.

The idea quickly gained popularity in the whole country. It was sponsored by the national Airborne and Antigas Defence League (Liga Obrony Powietrznej i Przeciwgazowej), with General Kazimierz Sosnkowski serving as the honorary director. Also, president Ignacy Mościcki was keenly interested in the project. However, military circles were informed by the civilian authorities that the flight would be possible if there were a serious scientific purpose associated to it. Therefore, professor Mieczyslaw Wolfke from the Warsaw Polytechnic suggested examination of the cosmic ray., which had been the scientific goal of several other high-altitude balloon flights.

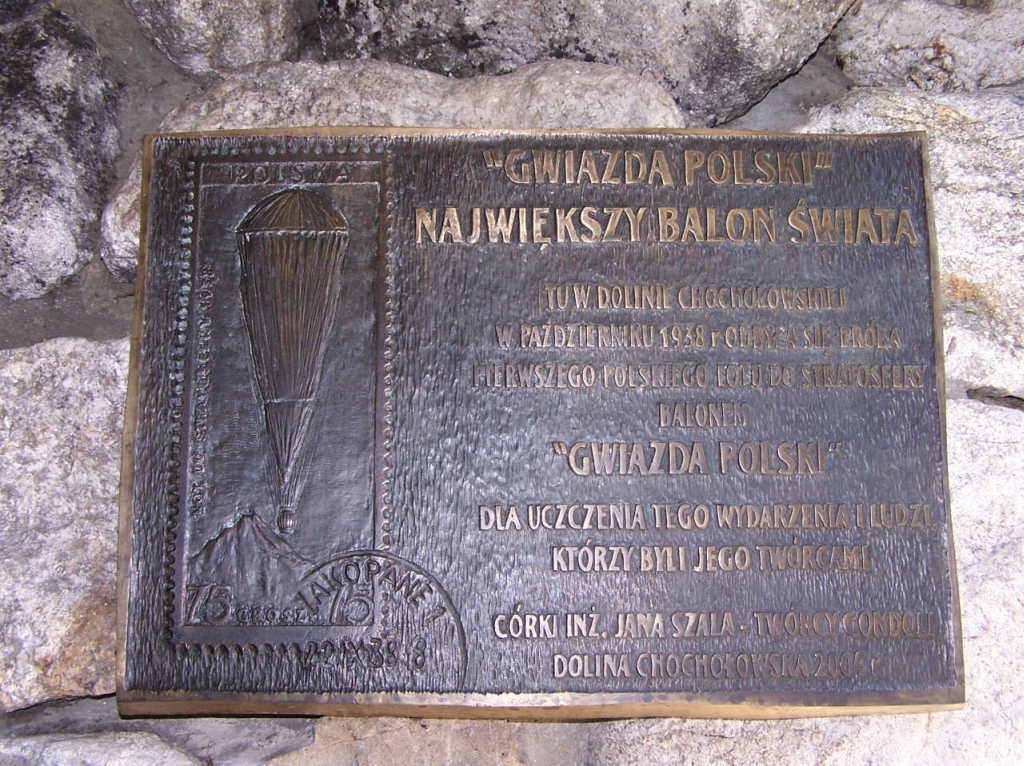
A tablet, dedicated to the mission, located on the wall of a shelter in the Chocholowska Valley

== Preparation ==
Some time in late 1937 or early 1938, a Scientific Council of Flight was created, which consisted of professors Wolfke, Szczepan Szczeniowski, Marian Miesowicz and Mieczyslaw Jezewski. They agreed that the pilots would examine distribution of the rays at various altitudes

Advanced equipment had been prepared, its main parts were a telescope consisting of 30 Geiger-Muller meters, and an Ionization chamber. The takeoff was scheduled for September 1938 in the Chocholowska Valley of the western Tatra Mountains. American experts, including Stevens himself (who came to Zakopane), provided technical assistance. Also, Auguste Piccard, who remained in Switzerland, anxiously anticipated news from Poland.

== The balloon ==
The balloon, named Gwiazda Polski (The Star of Poland) was made by the Aviotex factory in Legionowo and was the world's largest

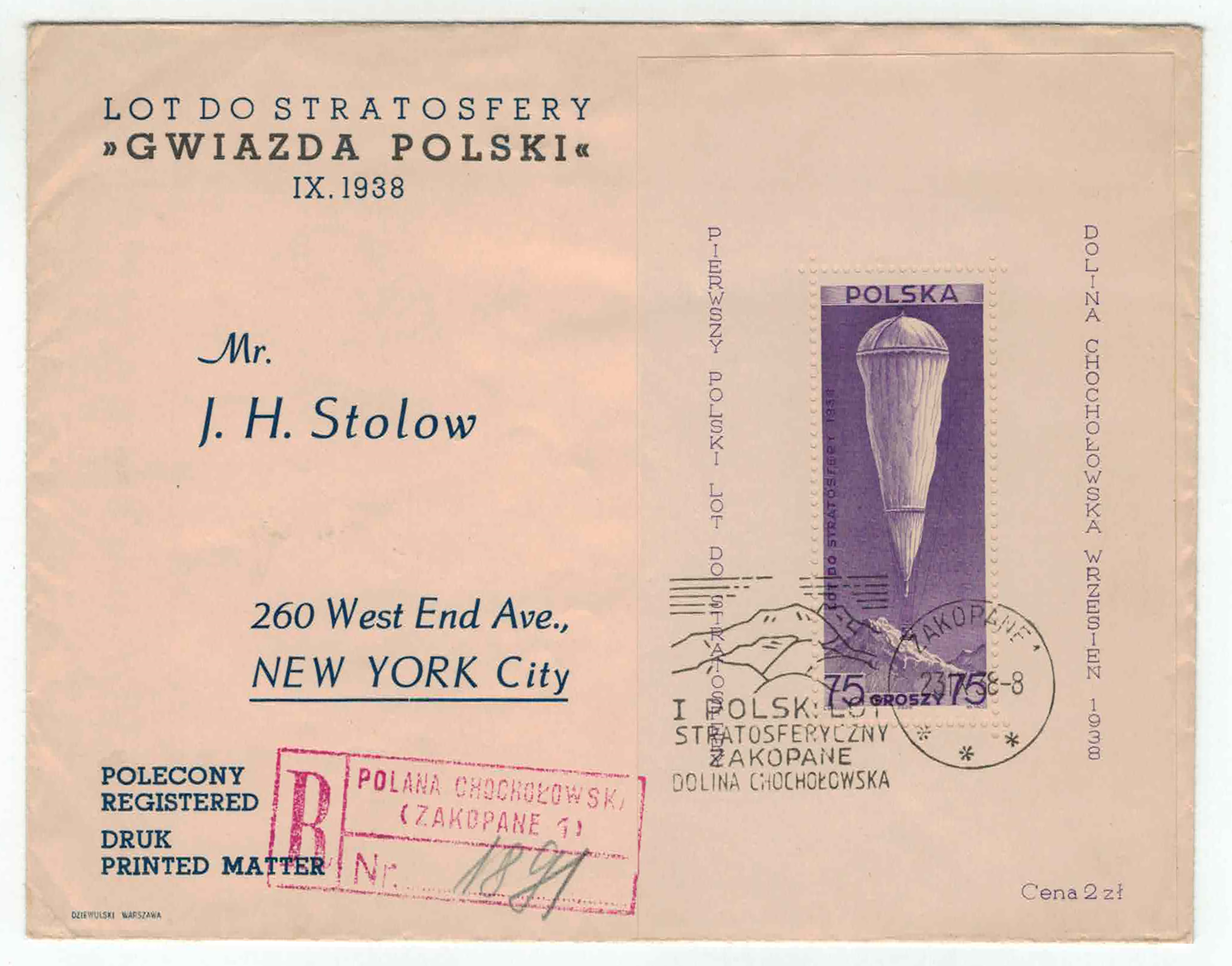
Registered letter to New York franked with a souvenir sheet issued to help raise money for the Gwiazda Polski (Star of Poland) ascent attempt. The sheet is canceled with a special commemorative postmark.

Its bag was made in Legionowo of Japanese silk covered with rubber, and the 500 kilograms (1,100 lb) gondola was constructed by engineer Jan Alfred Szal. Gwiazda Polski was an impressive construction. Its height was 120 meters (390 ft), capacity of the bag was 124,700 m³, size - 12,300 square metres (132,000 sq ft), and weight - 1,500 kilograms (3,300 lb). As costs of this undertaking were high, a special stamp, depicting the balloon was issued by the Polish Mail. Also, individual donors, including members of the Polish community in USA, helped with funding. The violet-color stamp was issued on September 15, 1938. Its market price was 75 grosze, but it was sold for 2 zlotys, with the 1.25 zloty surplus being donated to the Scientific Council of the Flight. Altogether some 65,000 such stamps were printed, and the mail office in Zakopane used specially made seals with depiction of the balloon on all letters and postcards in these days. Today those stamps are scarce, their prices reach up to 200 zlotys The balloon, which had been planned to land somewhere in Volhynia, carried several pieces of mail, sent to Łuck, Rowne and other places. After the fire, the Polish Mail sent those letters in the ordinary way sealed with information that the flight had not taken place due to fire.

== The crew ==
The crew consisted of two persons - Captain Zbigniew Burzyński (1902-1971), one of the best Polish balloon pilots of the 1930s, who had twice won the Gordon Bennett Cup, and a physicist, doctor Konstanty Jodko-Narkiewicz (1901-1963), expert in the cosmic rays, leader of the first Polish expedition to the Andes.

== The flight ==
Due to adverse weather conditions, the takeoff, planned for September 15, was postponed several times Finally, the Council decided that October 14 would be the final attempt, as winter in the Tatra mountains comes earlier than in the plains. On the scheduled day, a large group of spectators showed up in the Chocholowska Valley, brought by special buses and taxis. There were also numerous journalists, including those from the National Geographic. As the Kraków's Ilustrowany Kurier Codzienny newspaper wrote later, the crew, dressed in special uniforms with parachutes, loaded into the gondola. The bag began to raise at around 1:00 a.m., but strong winds made the task difficult. Few spectators knew that the bag was being filled with highly combustible hydrogen, the same gas implicated in the Hindenburg disaster. The safer alternative, helium, was not available to them as most of the world's supply was in Texas and the United States made use of most of the production.

At around 4:00 a.m. the gigantic balloon was filled with hydrogen. Without warning and from some undetermined cause, the stiff fabric went up in flames. According to witnesses, a spark appeared on the top of the bag and quickly enveloped the balloon. It burned very fast. Fortunately, the gondola was spared and no one was injured., which gave Polish scientists hope for a next attempt.

== Aftermath ==
As the gondola was saved, Polish experts decided to recreate the bag and organize another takeoff. In August 1939 the Americans provided the Poles with helium and the flight was planned between September 1–15, 1939, near the town of Sławsko, in the Gorgany On August 31, 1939, leading Polish daily Ilustrowany Kurier Codzienny wrote that preparations for the flight were almost completed, with several meteorogical stations established in the area of Slawsko, and 1015 bottles of American helium delivered by rail. The flight, which was to take place without any audience, was overseen by Engineer Dobrowolski, Major Markiewicz of the Polish Army, and American technical expert, Major Sleyert. However, the Invasion of Poland made it impossible.

== See also ==
LOPP - Airship project made alongside Gwiazda Polski
