= Polanco (disambiguation) =

Polanco is an upscale neighborhood of Mexico City.

Polanco may also refer to:

== Places ==
- Polanco metro station, a station of the Mexico City Metro that serves the Polanco neighborhood
- Polanco, Spain, a municipality in Spain
- Polanco, Zamboanga del Norte, a municipality in the Philippines
- Polanco Hill in Valparaiso, Chile, site of the Polanco Lift
- San Gregorio de Polanco, a city in Uruguay
- Polanco Palace, historic building in Valparaíso, Chile

== People ==
- Polanco (surname), includes list of people with the name
