= Volcán del Viento =

Mountain in Argentina

Volcan del Viento
- Gendarme Argentino 2
- Location within Argentina

Highest point
- Elevation: 6,028 m (19,777 ft)
- Prominence: 452 m (1,483 ft)
- Parent peak: Ojos del Salado
- Isolation: 4.9 km (3.0 mi) to Tipas
- Coordinates: 27°11′27.95″S 068°28′24.23″W

Geography
- Parent range: Argentinean Andes, Andes, Andean Volcaninc Belt

Climbing
- First ascent: 1988-01-12 - Claudio Bravo, Luis Salinas (Argentina)

Volcan del Viento also called Gendarme Argentino 2 is a remote mountain in Argentina with an elevation of 6,028 metres (19,777 ft) metres. Volcan del Viento is within the following mountain ranges: Argentinean Andes, Puna de Atacama and Andean Volcaninc Belt (Central Part). It is located at the Argentinean province of Catamarca. Its slopes are entirely within the territory of the Argentinean city of Fiambalá.

== First ascent ==
The first ascent was reported on February 7, 1937, by Justyn Wojsznis, leader of the Second Polish Andean Expedition Another claim of first ascent has been made several decades later: that Volcan del Viento was first climbed by Claudio Bravo, Luis Salinas (Argentina) on January 12, 1988.

== Elevation ==
Other data from available digital elevation models: SRTM yields 6009 metres, ASTER 5987 metres, ASTER filled 6009 metres, ALOS 5987 metres, TanDEM-X 6049 metres. The height of the nearest key col is 5576 meters, leading to a topographic prominence of 452 meters. Volcan del Viento is considered a Mountain according to the Dominance System and its dominance is 7.5%.
