= Ramada Norte =

Mountain in Argentina

Ramada
- Location within Argentina

Highest point
- Elevation: 6,384 m (20,945 ft)
- Prominence: 1207 metres
- Parent peak: Mercedario
- Coordinates: 32°4′58.07″S 070°1′04.43″W

Geography
- Country: Argentina
- Parent range: Cordillera de la Ramada, Andes

Climbing
- First ascent: 02/02/1934 - Constantine Narkiewicz-Jodko (Poland)

Ramada is a group or massif in Argentina. It has a height of 6,384 metres (20,945 ft). It's located at Calingasta Department, San Juan Province, at the Cordillera de la Ramada.

== Elevation ==
Based on the elevation provided by the available Digital elevation models, SRTM (6371m), SRTM2 (6375m), ASTER (6360m), SRTM filled with ASTER (6375m), TanDEM-X(6402m), and also a handheld GPS survey by Maximo Kausch on 12/2009 (6380 meters), Ramada seems to be 6384 meters above sea level.

The height of the nearest key col is 5177 meters so its prominence is 1207 meters. Ramada is listed as group or massif, based on the Dominance system and its dominance is 18.91%. This information was obtained during a research by Suzanne Imber in 2014.

== See also ==
- List of mountains in the Andes
