= Lech (airship) =

Polish airship

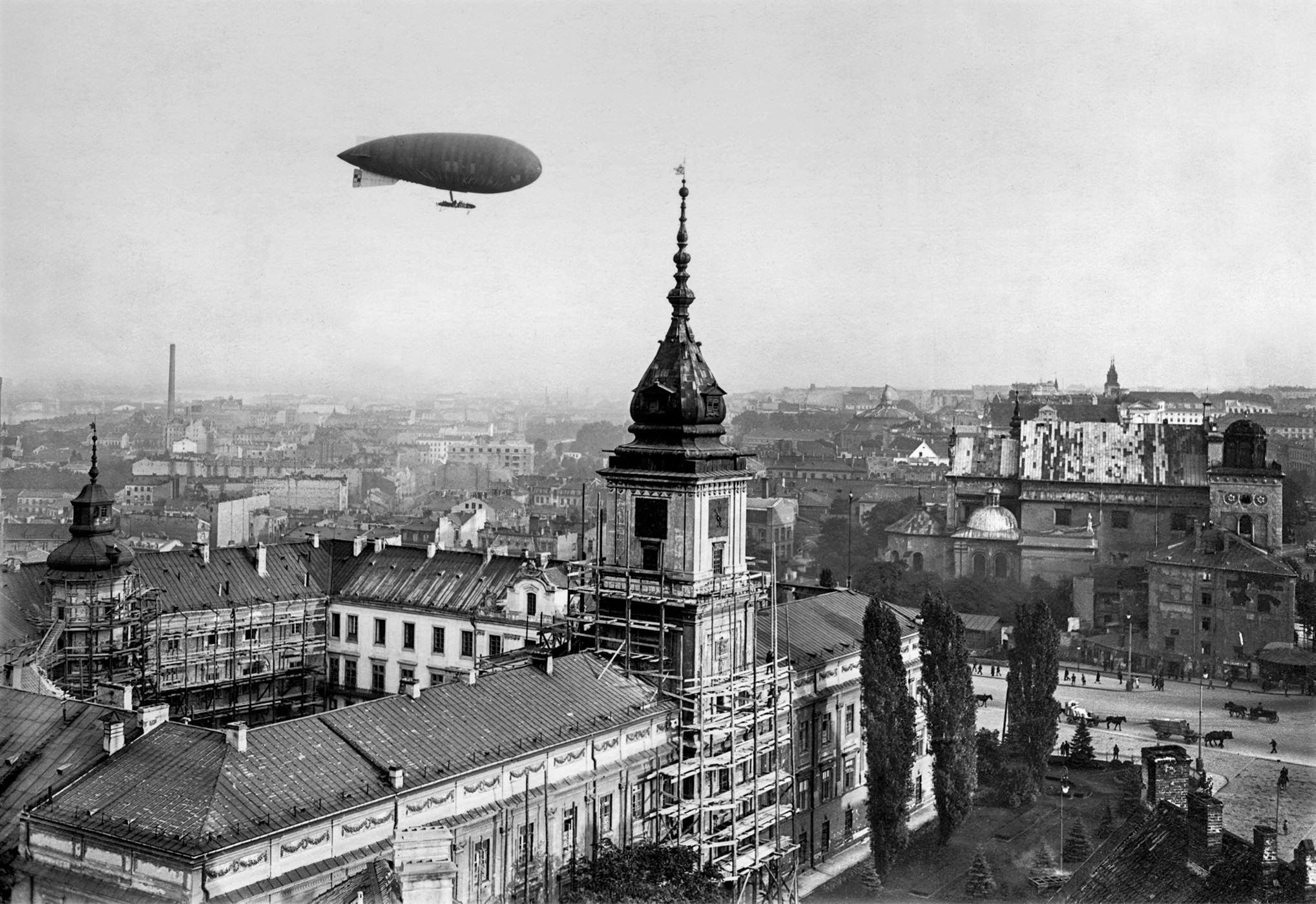
Lech over Warsaw in 1926

Lech was the first Polish airship. It was purchased from France's army surplus in 1920. The airship's type was Zodiac VZ-11, Vedette class and the French Navy had used it for patrolling and escorting purposes in the area of the Mediterranean. Like other airships of that age, it was filled with flammable hydrogen. It was propelled by two Renault engines (some sources claim these were Anzani engines), each with 80 horsepower. Altogether, the French built 63 Zodiac VZ-11 airships, they were sold to various countries, such as Argentina, USA, Russia and the Netherlands.

Renamed Lech, it was brought in parts to the port of Danzig some time in early 1921. Then, in March of that year, it was transported to Toruń, where it was assembled by Zbigniew Burzynski. Between 1921 and 1924, it belonged to the Officer's Aeronautical School in Toruń, then it was passed over to the 1st Balloon Battalion, also in Toruń. Its first commandant was Colonel Slawomir Bilek, then he was replaced by Captain Kazimierz Kraczkiewicz. Lech made numerous flights to Legionowo and Poznań's airport in the district Winiary - places, where special zeppelin halls existed. During those flights, 18 pilots as well as several members of the crew completed practice courses.

On March 2, 1928, Lech was scrapped and the bag's fabric was used for making five field air-sheds.

== Specifications ==
=== General characteristics ===
- Capacity: 7-8 persons
- Length: 50 m
- Diameter: 12 m
- Volume: 3150 m3
- Range: 800 km
- Service ceiling: 3000 m
- Time span of engines - up to 10 hours
- Cargo - up to 320 kilograms of bombs.

=== Performance ===
- Maximum speed: 80 km/h
