= Alma Negra =

Mountain in Argentina

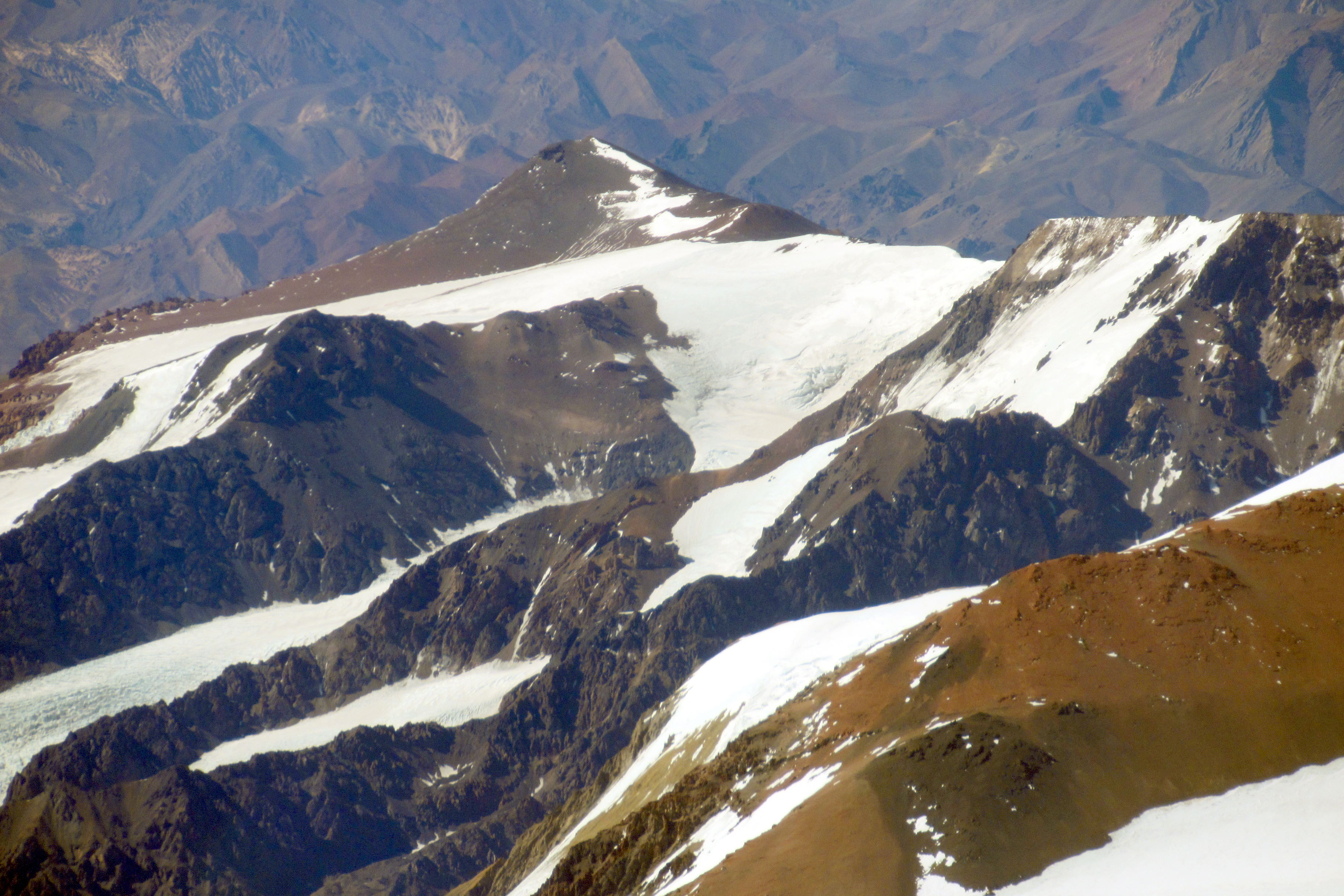

Highest point
- Elevation: 6,110 m (20,050 ft)
- Coordinates: 32°5′47″S 70°4′45″W

Geography
- Location: San Juan Province, Argentina
- Parent range: Cordillera de la Ramada, Andes

Climbing
- First ascent: 1934 by Jan Kazimierz Dorawski and Wiktor Ostrowski

Alma Negra is a mountain in the Cordillera de la Ramada range of the Andes Mountains, in Argentina. It has a height of 6,110 metres (20,046 ft).

The first ascent of the mountain was by a Polish expedition in 1934 (leader, Konstanty Jodko-Narkiewicz; summit climbed by Jan Kazimierz Dorawski and Wiktor Ostrowski on February 9 that year), when a cairn was erected on the summit.

In 2022, Austrian climber Christian Stangl reached the summit of Alma Negra on a new route from the south side in a solo ascent.

== See also ==
- List of mountains in the Andes
