= La Mesa (mountain) =

Mountain in Argentina

Cerro La Mesa
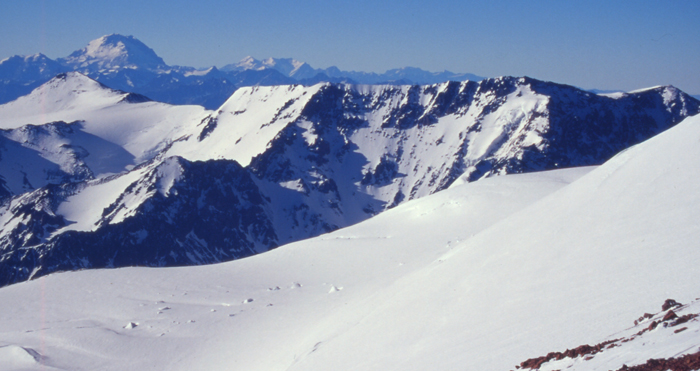
- Cerro de la Mesa seen from the slopes of Mercedario.

Highest point
- Elevation: 6,180 m (20,280 ft)
- Prominence: 955 m (3,133 ft)
- Parent peak: Mercedario
- Coordinates: 32°3′50″S 70°9′58″W

Geography
- Location within Argentina
- Location: Argentina
- Parent range: Cordillera de la Ramada

Climbing
- First ascent: 01/21/1971 - Hans Schöenberger (Austria)

Cerro La Mesa or La Mesa or Cerro de la Mesa is a mountain in the Cordillera de la Ramada range of the Andes, in Argentina. It has a height of 6,180 metres (20,276 ft). La Mesa means table in Spanish. The name of the mountain comes its flat and long summit ridge (there are six summits, the 6200m being the highest). Despite the dry climate of the area, there are significant glaciers flowing down the southern and the eastern flank of the mountain. Its slopes are within the administrative boundaries of the Argentinean city of Calingasta, Province of San Juan.

== First ascent ==
La Mesa was first climbed by Hans Schöenberger (Austria) on January 1, 1971. The Polish 1934 expedition (February 10 of that year; leader: Konstanty Narkiewicz-Jodko, summit climbed by Wiktor Ostrowski, Jan Kazimierz Dorawski) is sometimes credited with first ascent reached a 'southeast pinnacle'.

== Elevation ==
Other data from available digital elevation models: SRTM yields 6158 metres, ASTER 6167 metres, ASTER filled 6161 metres, TanDEM-X 6200 metres. The height of the nearest key col is 5225 meters, leading to a topographic prominence of 955 meters. La Mesa is considered a Mountain Massif according to the Dominance System and its dominance is 15.45%. Its parent peak is Mercedario and the Topographic isolation is 9.5 kilometers.

== See also ==
- List of mountains in the Andes
