= Zbigniew Burzyński =

Polish balloonist

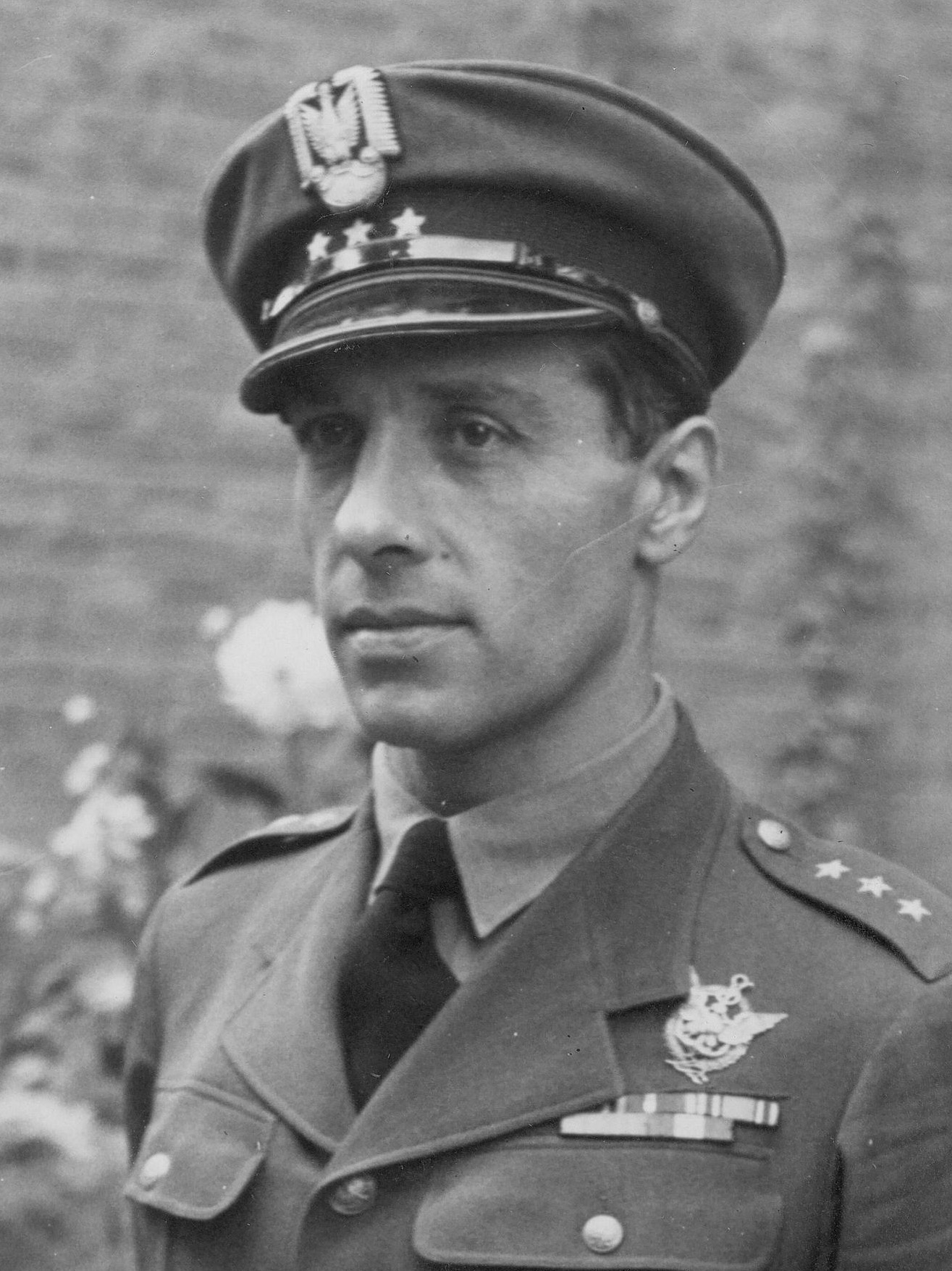
- Born: 31 March 1902; Żółkiew
- Died: 30 December 1971 (aged 69); Warsaw
- Military career
- Allegiance: Poland
- Branch: Polish Army
- Service years: 1921-1946
- Rank: Captain
- Units: 1st Mountain Artillery Regiment; 2nd Balloon Battalion
- Conflicts

Zbigniew Jan Władysław Antoni Burzyński (31 March 1902 in Zhovkva, Polish: Żółkiew near Lwów – 30 December 1971 in Warsaw), was a Polish balloonist and constructor of balloons, pioneer of Polish balloons, who twice won the Gordon Bennett Cup in ballooning, also beat the world record.

== Biography ==
Zbigniew Burzyński was the son of Helena Jaźwiecka and Władysław Burzyński, a forestry engineer. Raised in a middle-class family, he attended high schools in Lwów, Vienna and Kraków, where he joined the Cadet Corps and in 1919 graduated. Then, he entered the Artillery School in Poznań, after this school, briefly serving in the 2nd Mountain Artillery Regiment in Nowy Targ.

On 1 May 1921 Burzyński was sent to a course of aeronautic observers at the Officers' Aeronautic School in Toruń. He completed it with honors and remained there as a lecturer, where he was promoted to Second Lieutenant. He translated from French the handbook of the first Polish zeppelin and participated in its assembly as well as first flights. In the summer of 1922, he made the first balloon flight. The next year, he was promoted to Lieutenant.

In 1924 Burzyński received training at the balloon factory in the French aeronautical centre of Chalais-Meudon. After returning, he opened a shop in Legionowo, which produced fabrics for balloon bags. Under his command, first Polish balloons were made. He remained in Legionowo until 1937, as commandant of the company of observatory balloons in the 2nd Balloon Battalion of the Polish Army. Also, in 1934 he was promoted to Captain. Between 1937 and 1939 he completed the technical course for aviation officers in Warsaw, creating a prototype of the first Polish barrage balloon.

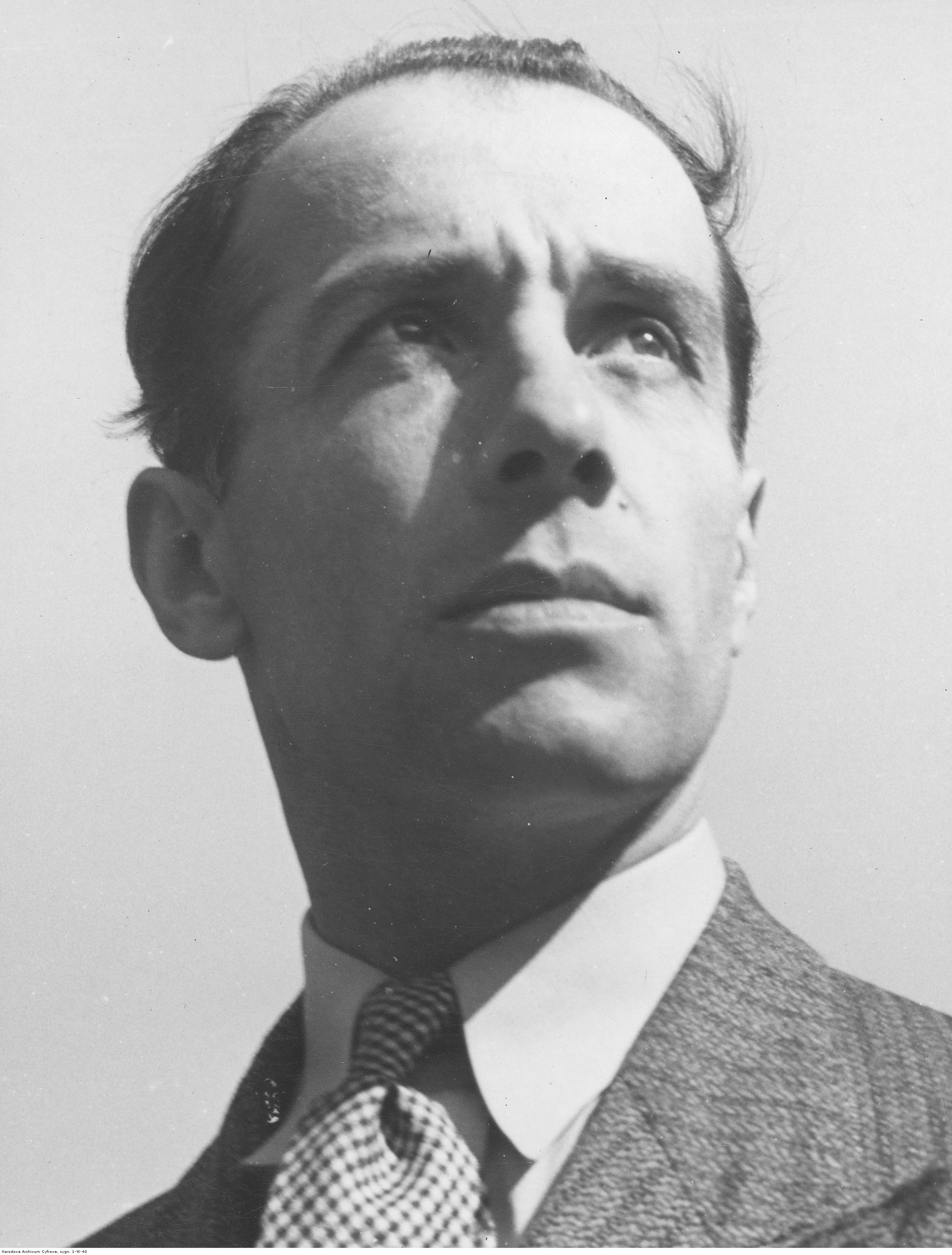
Zbigniew Burzyński

Burzyński also actively participated in ballooning tournaments. His first competition took place in September 1928, during the National Tournament of Balloons. Flying in Lwów, together with Franciszek Hynek, they finished first, with a total distance of 380 km. The following year, flying in Wilno, he participated in international tournament in Poznań, but without success.

In 1932 Burzyński and Hynek were the first Polish crew to participate in the Gordon Bennett Cup. Flying the Gdynia, they crossed 1075 kilometres from Basel to Bielany in 17 hours, with an average speed of 63 km/h, which was the best speed of all 16 crews. On February 28, 1933 Burzyński and Hynek ascended in Toruń to an altitude of 9762 m, beating the Polish record.

In the 1933 Gordon Bennett Cup, which took place in United States, Hynek, with Burzyński as his co-pilot, won the competition, flying 1361 km in Kosciuszko from Chicago to Aulmes in Canada in 39 hours and 39 minutes. The next year, in the Gordon Bennett Cup in Poland, Burzyński's crew finished second in Warszawa II to his former teammate Hynek, who took first in the "Kościuszko" with a new teammate. In the 1935 Gordon Bennett Cup, Burzyński and new teammate W. Wysocki took first place with a flight of 1650 km, a world record for distance, landing at Tishkino, USSR, near Kazan 57 hours and 54 minutes after takeoff.

In the fall of 1938 Burzyński planned to fly in the Gwiazda Polski, but the takeoff did not take place due to fire.

During the Polish September Campaign, Burzyński was caught by the Germans and kept in a POW camp from 6 October 1939 until 1 April 1945. In November of that year, he returned to Poland. In 1955 he graduated from the Warsaw Polytechnic, earning a diploma of engineer of mechanics. Also, he initiated recreational ballooning in Poland as well as Czechoslovakia. He authored two books: Kosciuszko nad Ameryka (1934) and Balonem przez kontynenty (1956).

== Awards and decorations ==
- Officer's Cross of the Order of Polonia Restituta (1964)
- Knight's Cross of the Order of Polonia Restituta (11 November 1935)
- Gold Cross of Merit (twice, 1933, 1934)
- Commemorative Medal for the War of 1918–1921
- Medal of the 10th Anniversary of Regained Independence
- Bronze Medal of Merit for National Defence (1967)
- Badge of Honour of the Airborne and Antigas Defence League

== Sources ==
- Jerzy R. Konieczny, Tadeusz Malinowski: "Mala encyklopedia lotnikow polskich", Warszawa 1983, ISBN 83-206-0337-4.
