= Polacco =

Polacco is a surname. Notable people with the surname include:

- Cesare Polacco (1900–1986), Italian actor and voice actor
- Giorgio Polacco (1875–1960), Italian conductor
- Patricia Polacco (born 1944), American author and illustrator

== See also ==
- Polanco (surname)
