= Pico Polaco =

Mountain in Argentina

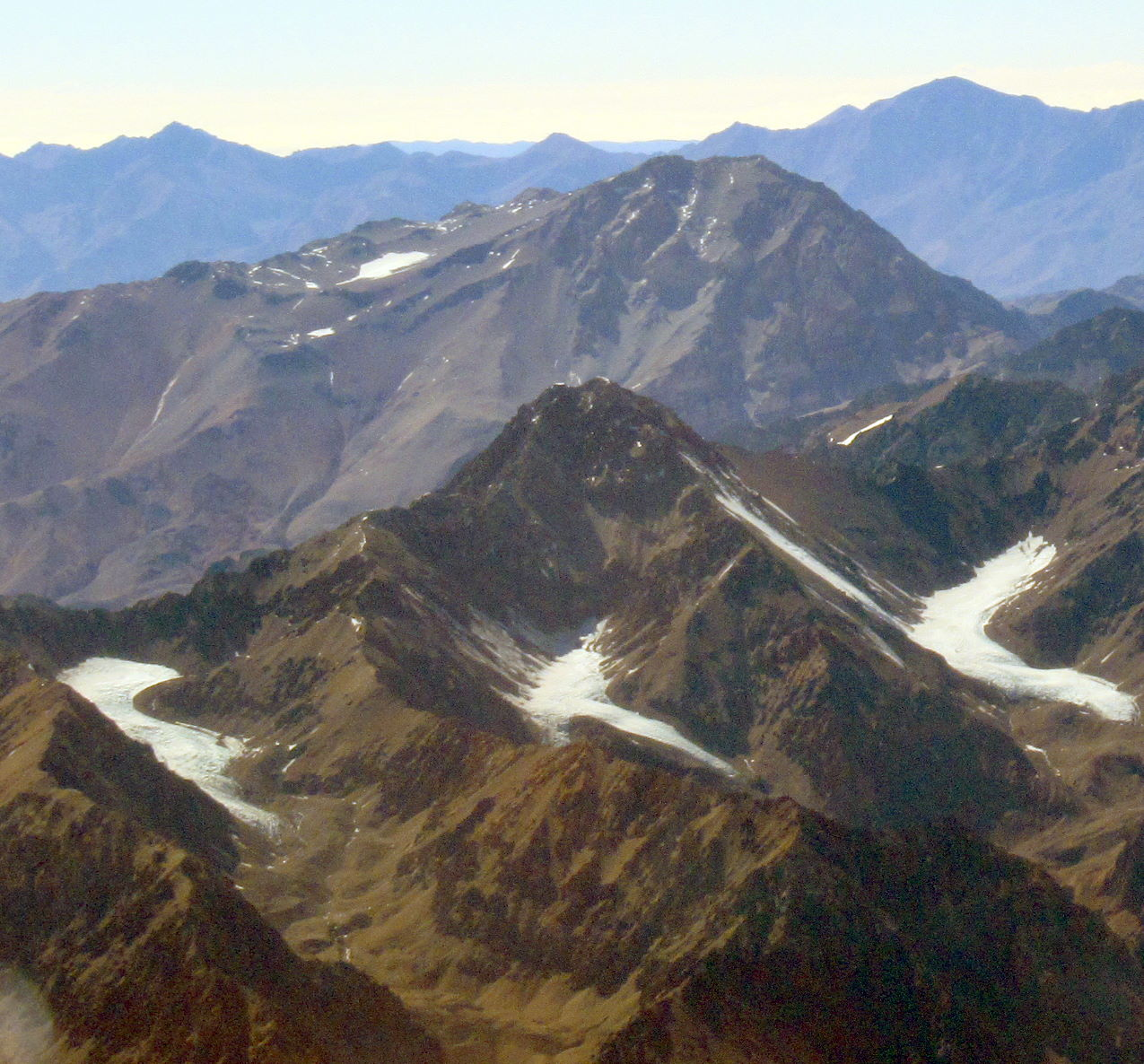

Highest point
- Elevation: 5,950 m (19,520 ft)
- Prominence: 495 metres (1,624 ft)
- Parent peak: La Mesa
- Coordinates: 32°1′43.32″S 070°6′34.19″W

Geography
- Location within Argentina
- Country: Argentina
- Parent range: Cordillera de la Ramada, Andes

Climbing
- First ascent: 21204 - Antonio Beorchia Nigris (Italia) and Edgardo Yacante (Argentina)

Pico Polaco (lit. Polish Peak) is a mountain located in Argentina with a height of 5,950 metres (19,521 ft). It is located at Calingasta Department, San Juan Province, at the Cordillera de la Ramada.

== Name ==
The name was given to the peak following the first documented attempt at first ascent, after the Polish climbers (who were the first explorers) in honor of their achievements within the Cordillera de la Ramada. The Polish expedition referred to the mountain as Innominata ("Unnamed") or "Cerro N".

== Location ==
It is located at Calingasta Department, San Juan Province, at the Cordillera de la Ramada.

== Elevation ==
It has an official height of 5965 meters Based on the elevation provided by the available Digital elevation models, SRTM (5936m), SRTM2 (5920m), ASTER (5913m), SRTM filled with ASTER (5920m), TanDEM-X(5827m), Pico Polaco is about 5950 meters above sea level.

The height of the nearest key col is 5455 meters, so its prominence is 495 meters. Pico Polaco is listed as mountain, based on the Dominance system and its dominance is 8.32%. Its parent peak is La Mesa and the topographic isolation is 4 kilometers. This information was obtained during a research by Suzanne Imber in 2014.

== First ascent ==
The first attempt to climb the mountain was by a Polish expedition in 1934, abandoned due to bad weather and one of the team members' foot injury. The first successful ascent was done in 1958 by Argentine climbers A. Beorchia and E. Yacante.

== See also ==
- List of mountains in the Andes
