= Polanco (surname) =

Polanco is a Spanish surname originating from the municipality of Polanco, Cantabria in Spain. Notable people with the surname include:

- Alfonso Polanco, mayor of Palencia, Spain
- Amelia Vega Polanco, Miss Universe 2003
- Andrés López Polanco, painter active in 17th century in Valencia, Spain
- Antonio Botín Polanco, Spanish writer from Santander, Cantabria
- Carlos Enrique Polanco (born 1953), Peruvian painter
- Dalilah Polanco (born 1971), Mexican actress
- Dascha Polanco (born 1982), Dominican-American actress
- Eduardo Saenz de Buruaga y Polanco, Spanish military general
- Francisco Polanco, Spanish baroque painter of 17th century
- Geovanny Polanco (born 1974), Dominican merengue singer
- Gregory Polanco (born 1991), Dominican baseball player
- Jenny Polanco (1958–2020), Dominican fashion designer
- Jesús Polanco (1929–2007), Spanish businessman and founder of El Pais and Grupo PRISA. Ranked in Forbes' richest list 2006
- Jorge Polanco (born 1993), Dominican baseball player
- Jose Maria Alfaro Polanco, Spanish writer and politician
- Juan Hidalgo de Polanco (1614-1685), Spanish composer, father of the Spanish Opera and of the Zarzuela
- Juan Alfonso de Polanco (1517-1576)- Spanish Jesuit Priest and secretary to Ignatius of Loyola
- Luis Polanco, Spanish governor of Toleto
- Nicolás Manrique de Lara y Polanco, noble of the Marquesado de Lara
- Plácido Polanco (born 1975), Dominican-American Major League Baseball infielder
- Polanco family, noble family from Santillana del Mar, Cantabria
- Rohan Polanco (born 1998), Dominican boxer
- Tomas Polanco Alcantara, Venezuelan writer and historian
- Victoriano Polanco, Spanish painter from Santander

== See also ==
- Polanco
