= Cerro del Nacimiento =

Mountain in Argentina

Nacimiento
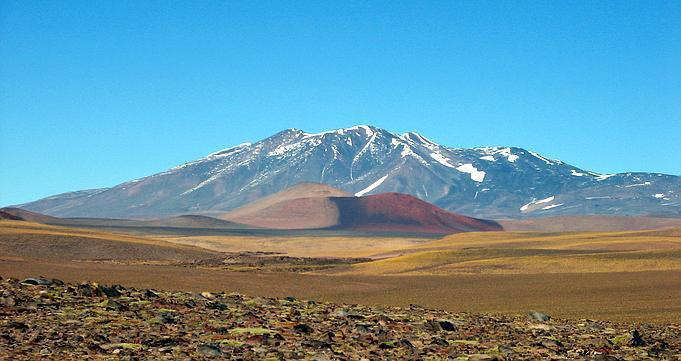

Highest point
- Elevation: 6,436 m (21,115 ft)
- Prominence: 496 m (1,627 ft)
- Coordinates: 27°16′50″S 68°30′45″W

Geography
- Location within Argentina
- Location: Catamarca, Argentina
- Parent range: Cordillera de la Ramada, Andes

Cerro del Nacimiento is an Andean volcano of the Cordillera de la Ramada range, in the Catamarca Province of Argentina. Its summit is 6,436 metres (21,115 ft) above sea level.

== See also ==
- List of mountains in the Andes
