= Polanco Palace =

Mansion in Valparaíso, Chile

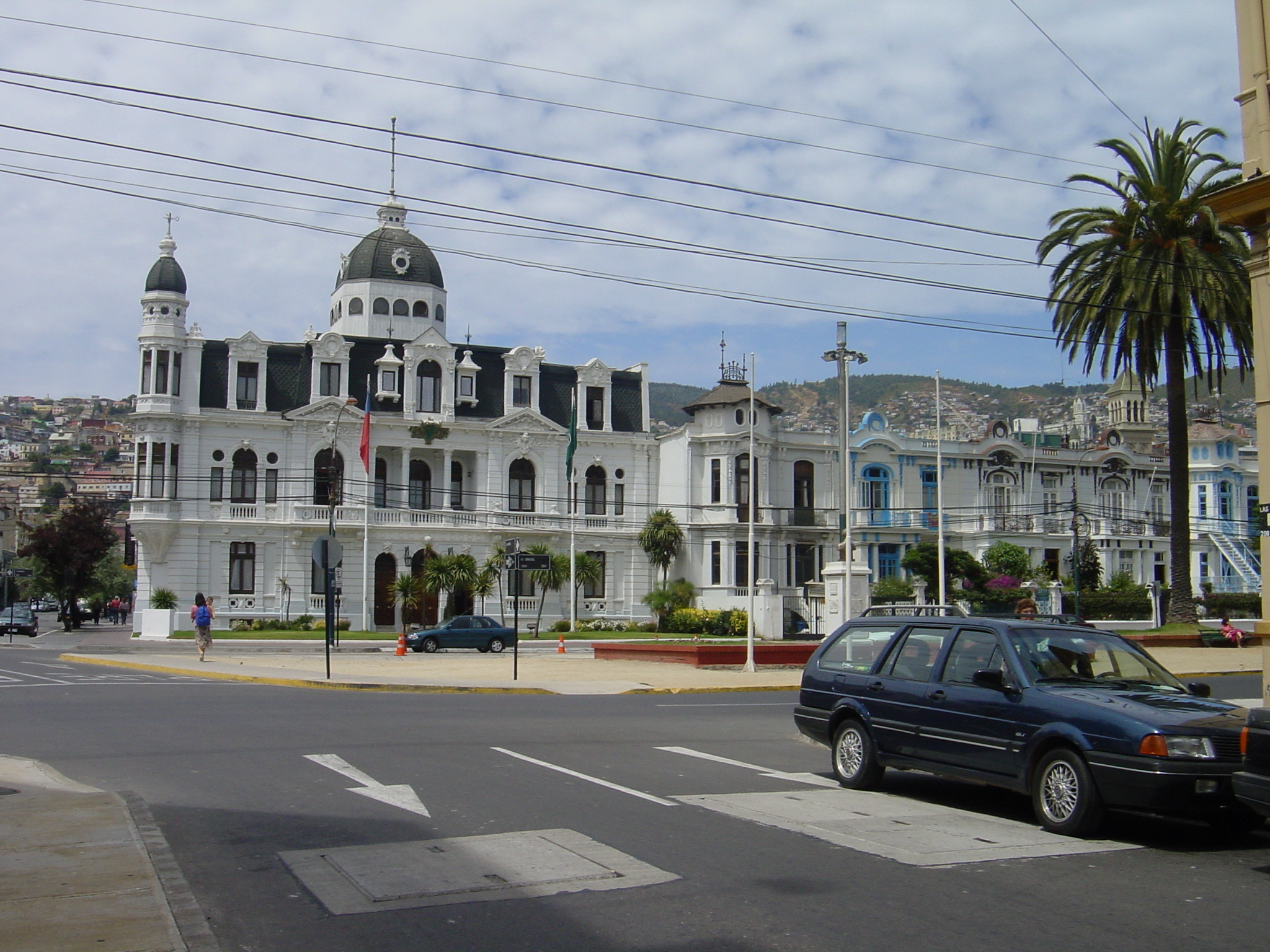
- Polanco Palace in 2006
- Interactive map of the Polanco Palace area

General information
- Architectural style: Historicist architecture. Late eclectic architecture, with Neo-Baroque elements
- Location: Valparaíso, Chile, Las Heras 202, Chile
- Coordinates: 33.04515°S 71.617047°W
- Construction started: 1901
- Completed: 1903
- Renovated: 2016-2017
- Landlord: Carabiniers of Chile

Technical details
- Floor count: 3 plus basement
- Floor area: 1862 m²

The Polanco Palace is a luxurious mansion located in the El Almendral neighborhood of the Chilean city of Valparaíso. It was built in 1903 by order of the Chilean merchant Benignus Polanco Humeres for residential use, and since 1942 it has been used by the Valparaíso Carabiniers prefecture.

It is the only remnant of the palaces built in the city during the 19th century on land reclaimed from the sea, during Valparaíso's economic and industrial boom. All the other palaces of that era located in El Almendral were destroyed by the 1906 Valparaíso earthquake. The building was affected by the 2010 earthquake, and since then it was abandoned until 2016, when its restoration began. For all these reasons, it is considered a property of high urban, architectural and historical value. It is currently considered a Inmueble de conservación histórica (Historic Preservation Property).

== History ==
=== Residential palace (1903-1906) ===
At the beginning of the 20th century, the Chilean merchant Benignus Polanco Humeres had his luxurious residence built in the El Almendral neighborhood of Valparaíso, specifically at the intersection of what is now Las Heras Street and the emerging Brazil Avenue, so named in 1897, replacing its former name of Gran Avenida. This neighborhood, built on land reclaimed from the sea, had been an attractive area for wealthy families to build their mansions since the 1860. Construction began in 1901 and was completed in 1903.

The building withstood the 1906 Valparaíso earthquake, which left a large part of the city destroyed.

=== Police prefecture (1912-1942) ===
After the 1906 earthquake, the building was given to the Prefectura de Policía Fiscal de Valparaíso, which, due to the loss of two of its police stations, had to improvise its headquarters in Plaza Victoria.

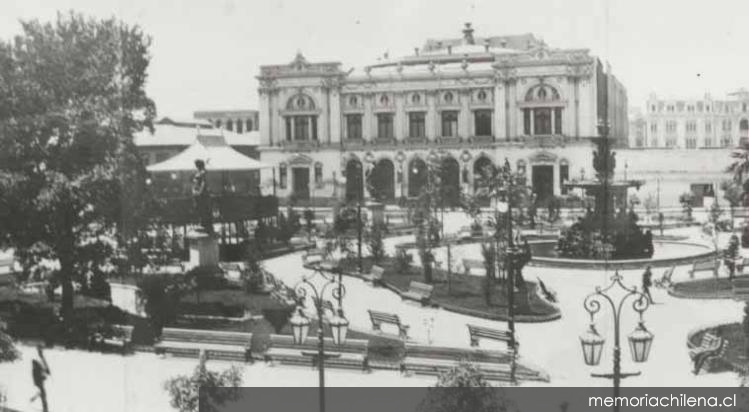
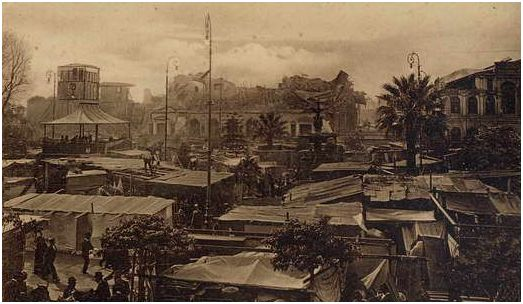
The state of the Plaza Victoria before and after the 1906 earthquake shows its catastrophic consequences

Wealthy families who lost their homes began to move to the adjacent city of Viña del Mar. Over time, the sector lost its acquired prestige and began to transform into a commercial and industrial sector.

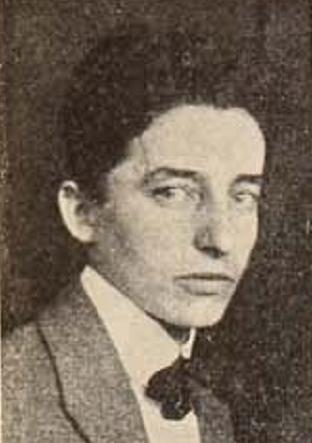
Camilo Mori began a relationship with Maruja Vargas around 1918, when she lived in the Polanco Palace.

President Ramón Barros Luco acquired the property in April 1912, to be used as a police prefecture. Thus, the mansion also became the permanent residence of General Vargas, police prefect at the time, and his family, including his daughter Maruja Vargas (1901-2005), who around 1918, at the age of 17, began a prolific sentimental relationship there with the famous painter Camilo Mori Serrano, despite her father's opposition.

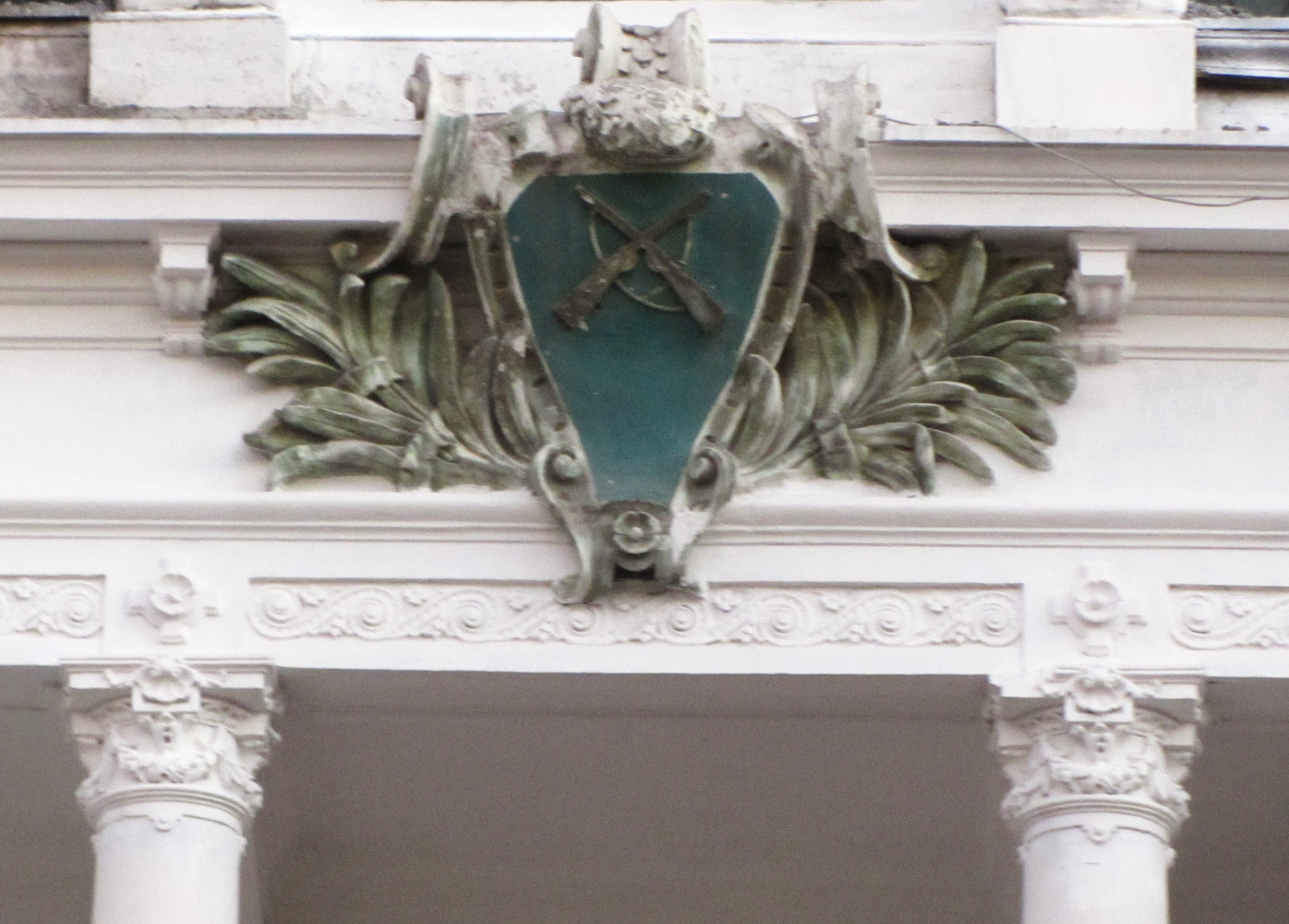
Detail of the Carabiniers of Chile coat of arms on the front of the building

=== Carabiniers of Chile (present) ===
In 1942, the building passed into the hands of the Valparaíso Carabiniers prefecture, and in 1986 it became the officers' casino of the same institution.

On February 27, 2010, the building was damaged by the strong earthquake that hit several regions of the country, after which it had to be evacuated. At the end of 2011, the Carabiniers Welfare Directorate drew up a tender for its comprehensive restoration, at a cost of $600 million pesos at the time, but the process was halted due to objections from the Comptroller General of the Republic. The building remained abandoned for four years, being the victim of vandalism and looting of pendants and bronze elements, until in 2014 police surveillance was arranged and a tender for its restoration was obtained at the end of that year. The restoration, in charge of the company Ariel Nuñez, began in mid-2016, with an investment of $640 million pesos and a stipulated timeframe of 270 days.

== Features ==
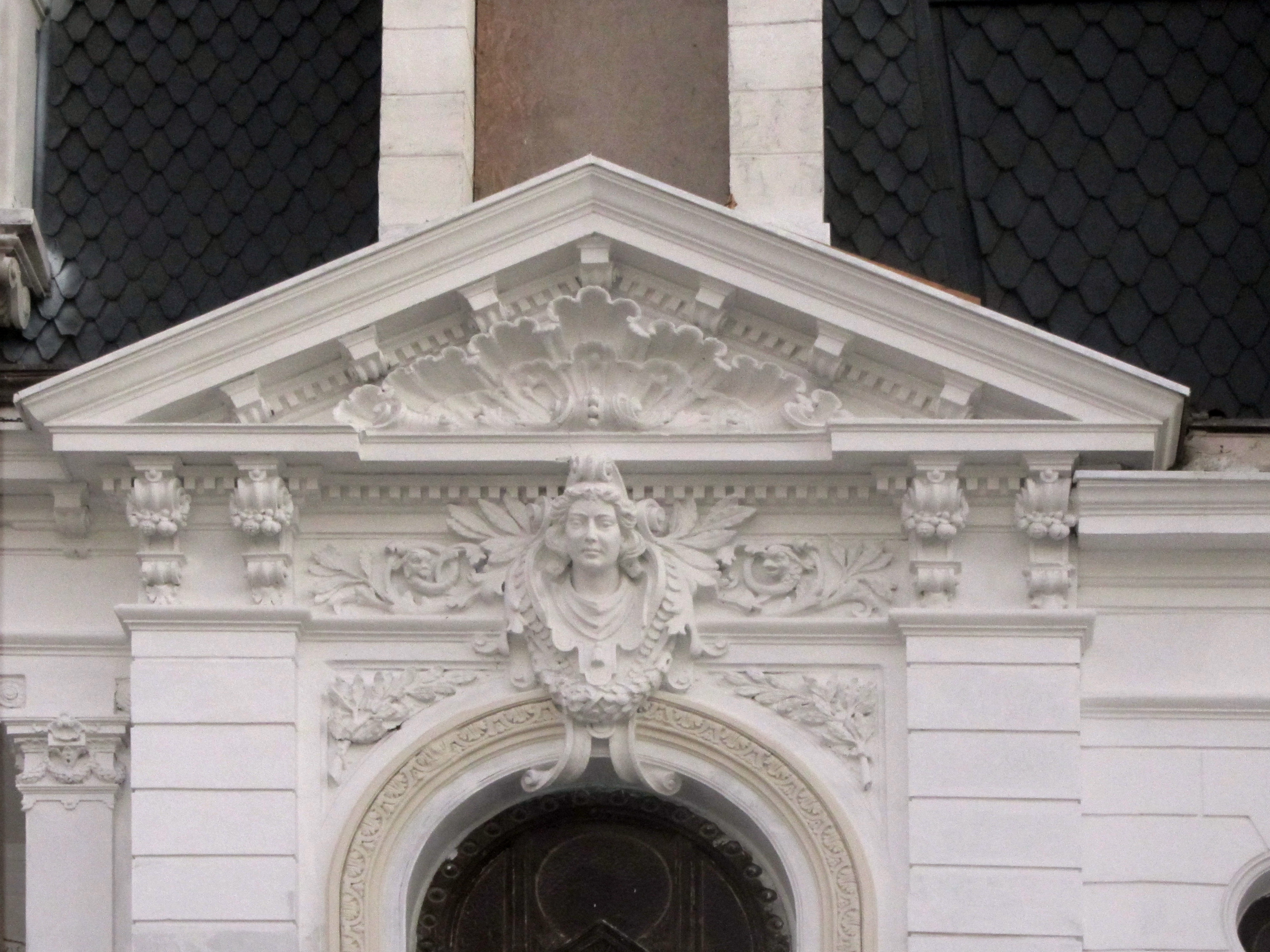
Detail of one of the reliefs on the frontispiece, in 2017

This is the only vestige of the luxurious palaces built in Valparaíso during the 19th century. The destruction of the other buildings was due in part to the fill and sandy soil on which all the buildings in this area were constructed, as it was on land reclaimed from the sea. From an urbanistic point of view, the building stands out for its volume, and today it is an outstanding part of a group of homogeneous buildings in the El Almendral neighborhood of great heritage value.

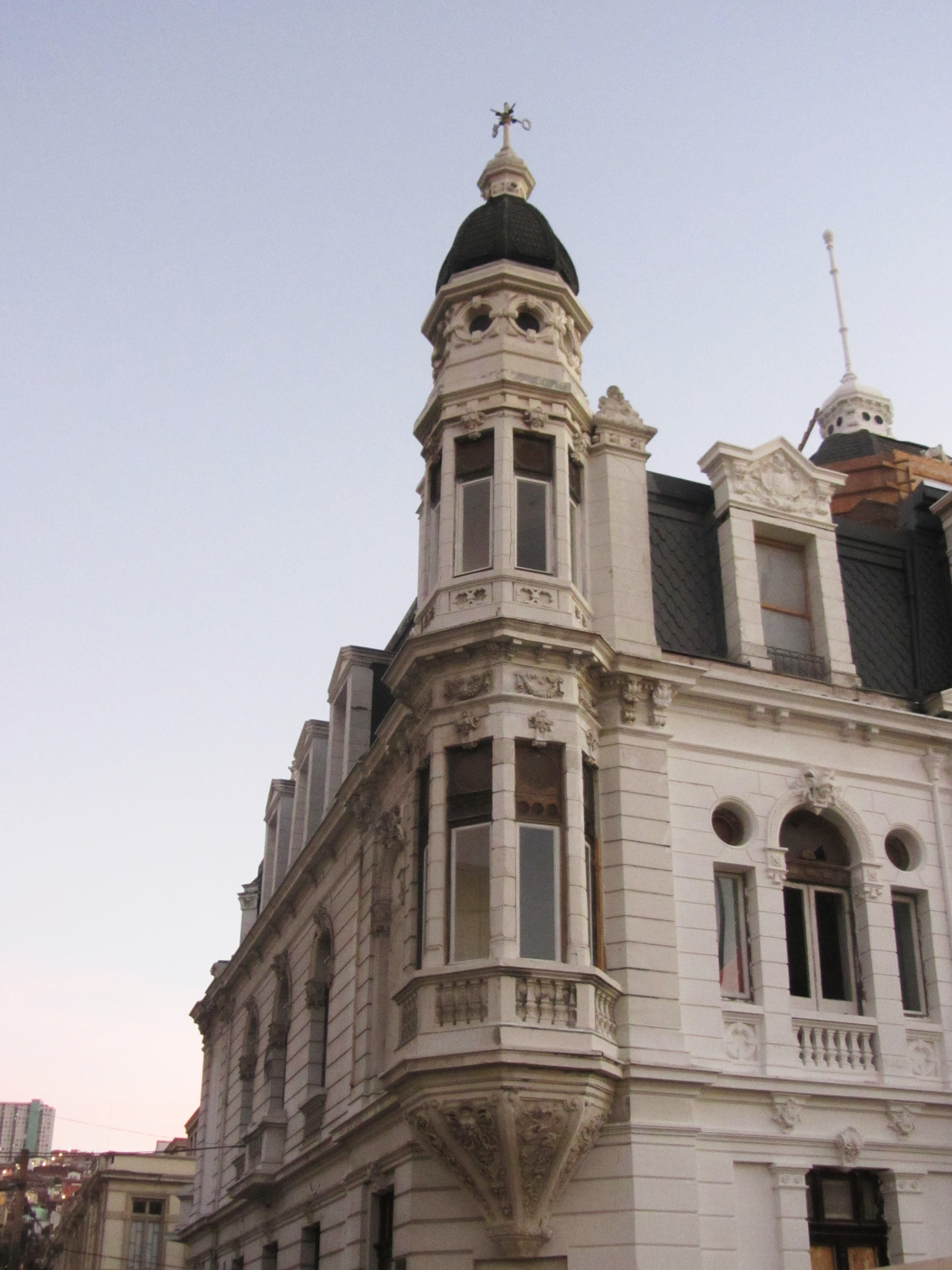
Detail of the tower of the Palace, in 2017

The building has a floor area of 1862 square meters on a site of 780 square meters. Its masonry structure is covered by a stucco facade, crowned by a galvanized steel roof and additional plaster and wood elements.

It is an important reference of late eclectic historicism, with accentuated neo-baroque elements that give it a great aesthetic and architectural quality. Its rich exterior ornamentation is made up of projections, porticoes, railings and elements that emulate fusta and capitals. Its upper cornice has tympanums and a mansard roof. It also has a central dome, and on the corner that faces the intersection of the streets, an attached volume topped by a showy keep .

The building consists of 3 floors and a basement, where 6 living rooms, 16 rooms and 6 suites are distributed. On the first floor is the kitchen, as well as a bar and a ballroom.

== Bibliography ==
- Sturm Moreira, Thomas (2008). "Valparaíso: Su patrimonio histórico y los sismos". Haz tu tesis en cultura 2008 (PDF) (in Spanish). Consejo Nacional de la Cultura y las Artes. pp. 89–126.
