= Szczepan Szczeniowski =

Polish physicist

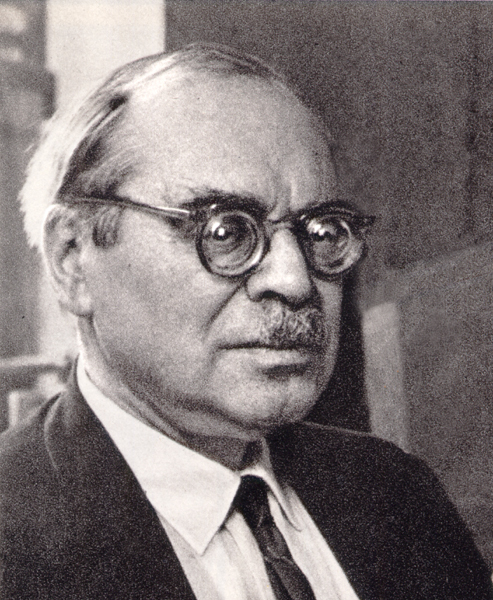
Szczepan Szczeniowski

Professor Szczepan Eugeniusz Szczeniowski (1898–1979), was a Polish physicist, and author of numerous papers on cosmic rays, electron diffraction and ferromagnetism. In early 1930s, he taught at the Jan Kazimierz University in Lwow, in 1937 moving to the Stefan Batory University in Wilno. After World War II, he settled in Poznań, also cooperating with the Warsaw Polytechnic. Szczeniowski was a member of many prestigious organizations - Technical Science Academy, Polish Academy of Knowledge and Polish Academy of Sciences.
