= Polish Glacier =

Glacial field on the highest peak in the Andes

Coordinates: 32°39′20″S 70°00′57″W

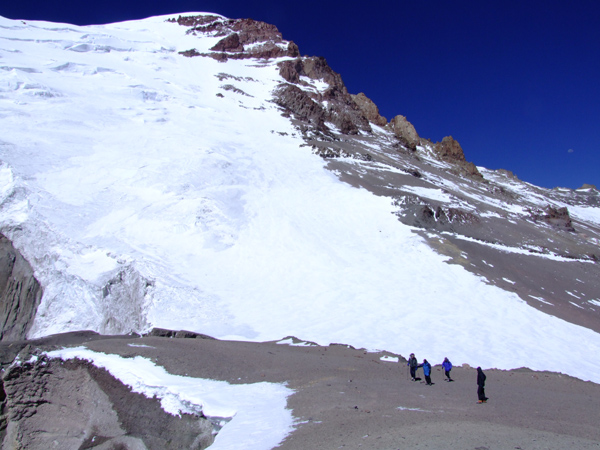
The Polish glacier from above the high camp

The Polish Glacier (Spanish Glaciar de los Polacos) is one of the glacial fields of Aconcagua, the highest peak in the Andes and the Americas. It was named after the Polish expedition of 1934. Led by Konstanty Jodko-Narkiewicz, the team developed an alternative route to the peak through the glacier, which was named the Polish Route.

== See also ==
- Aconcagua
- List of glaciers
