= Stefan Osiecki =

Polish painter

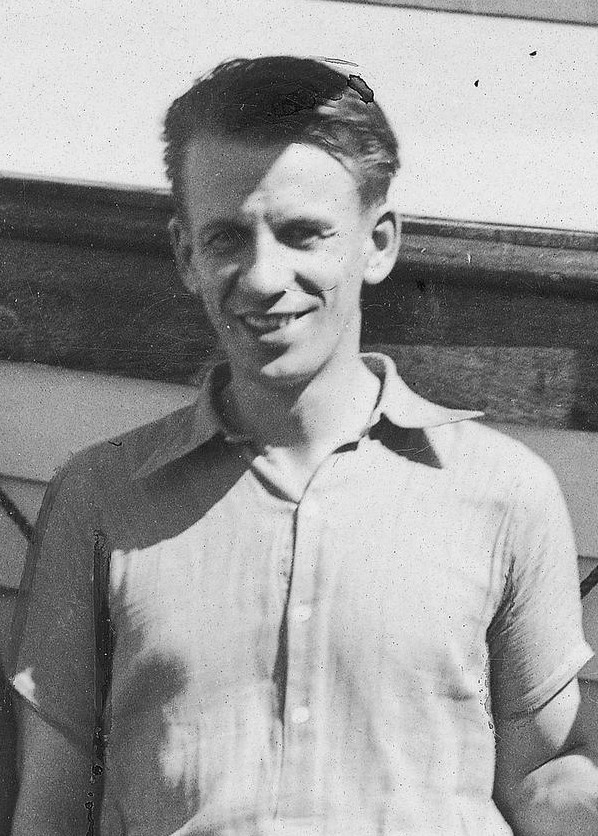
- Stefan Osiecki in 1937
- Born: 23 February 1902; Warsaw, Poland
- Died: 7 May 1977 (aged 75); London, England
- Occupation: Painter

Stefan Osiecki (23 February 1902 – 7 May 1977) was a Polish painter and mountaineer. His work was part of the painting event in the art competition at the 1932 Summer Olympics.

As a mountaineer, he took part in the 1930s Polish Andean expeditions.
