= Mercedario =

Mountain in Argentina

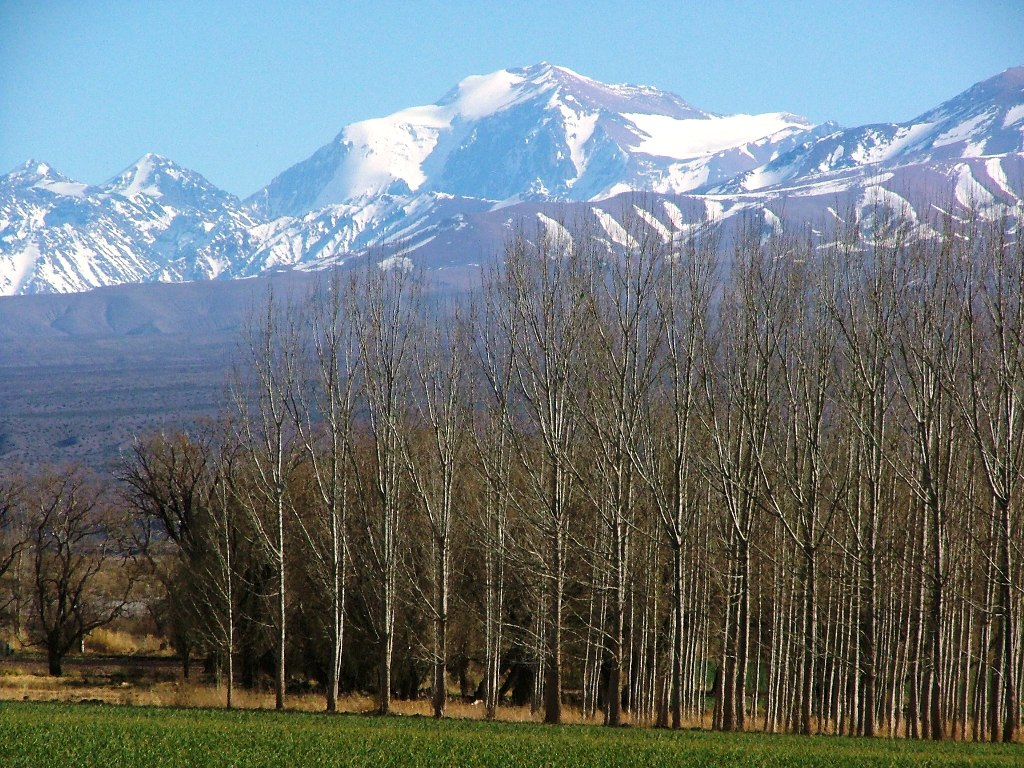
- View of the Mercedario from Barreal

Highest point
- Elevation: 6,720–6,770 m (22,050–22,210 ft); SRTM
- Prominence: 3,353 m (11,001 ft); Ranked 57th
- Isolation: 75.14 km (46.69 mi)
- Listing: Ultra
- Coordinates: 31°58′45″S 70°06′45″W

Geography
- Location within Argentina
- Location: San Juan, Argentina
- Parent range: Cordillera de la Ramada, Principal Cordillera, Andes

Climbing
- First ascent: 18 January 1934
- Easiest route: scramble

Cerro Mercedario is the highest peak of the Cordillera de la Ramada range and the eighth-highest mountain of the Andes. It is located 100 km to the north of Aconcagua, in the Argentine province of San Juan.

== Ascent history ==
It was first ascended on January 18, 1934, by Adam Karpiński and Wiktor Ostrowski, members of a Polish andinist expedition led by Konstanty Jodko-Narkiewicz. The Polish party erected a cairn on the summit.

In 1968, after several attempts by some of the strongest Argentine climbers, a Japanese group led by Saburo Yoshida accomplished the first ascent of the south side. In 1971 an Austrian expedition climbed the north side, led by Fritz Moravec and Othmar Kucera. In 1972, Italians Sergio Job Gino and Antonio Beorchia Nigris climbed the Mercedario through the normal route and discovered some Inca ruins just below the summit. In January 1975 an Italian expedition led by Antonio Mastellaro climbed the east side of the peak. In 1983 a small expedition from Gorizia was able to traverse the south-west ridge, which is considered the most difficult route on the mountain, and one of the last mountaineering issues in the Andes. On January 27 Mauro Collini, Sergio Figel, Mario Tavagnutti and Rudi Vittori reached the top.

== Photo gallery ==
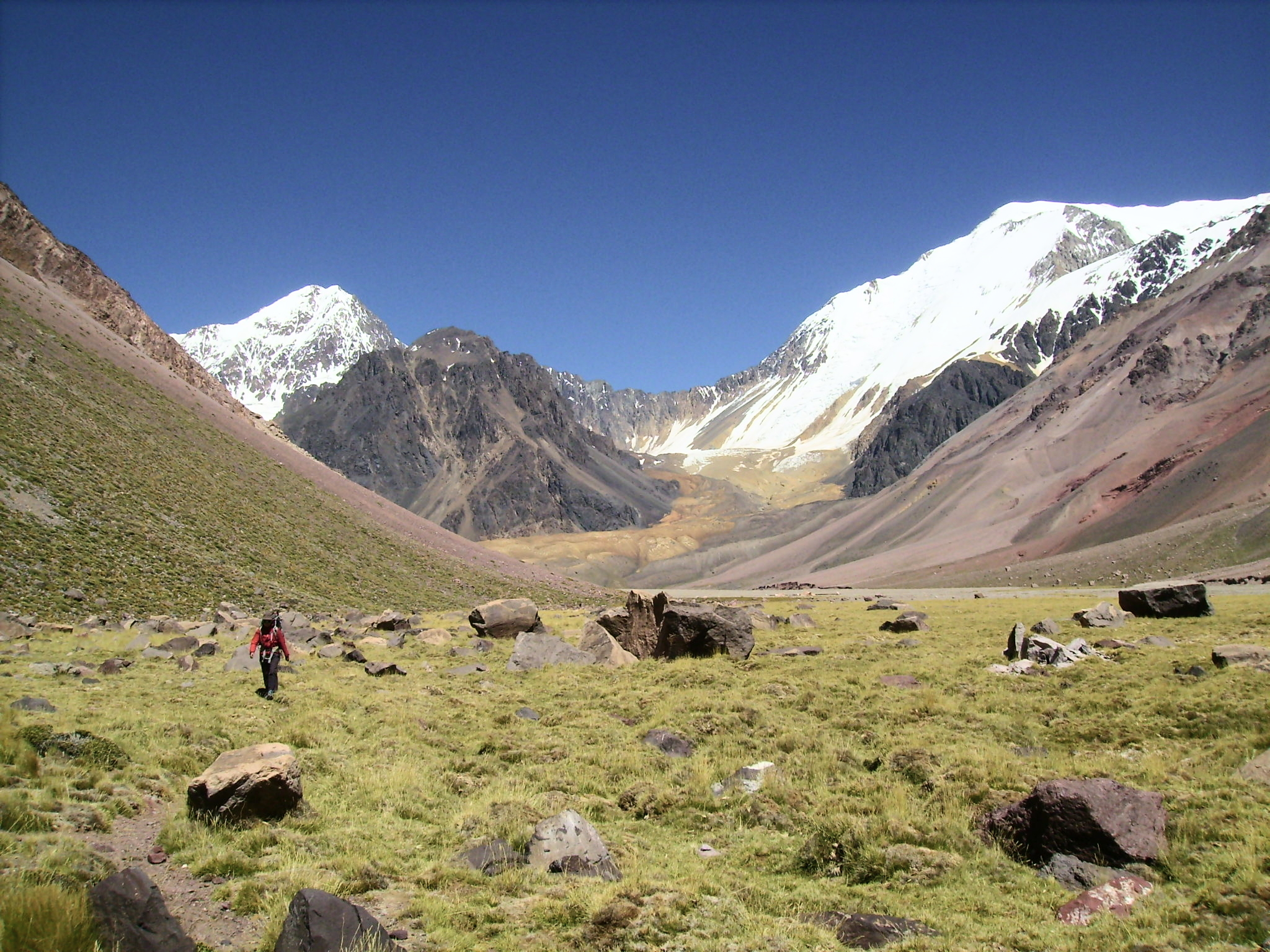
The mountain seen from the Colorado Valley.

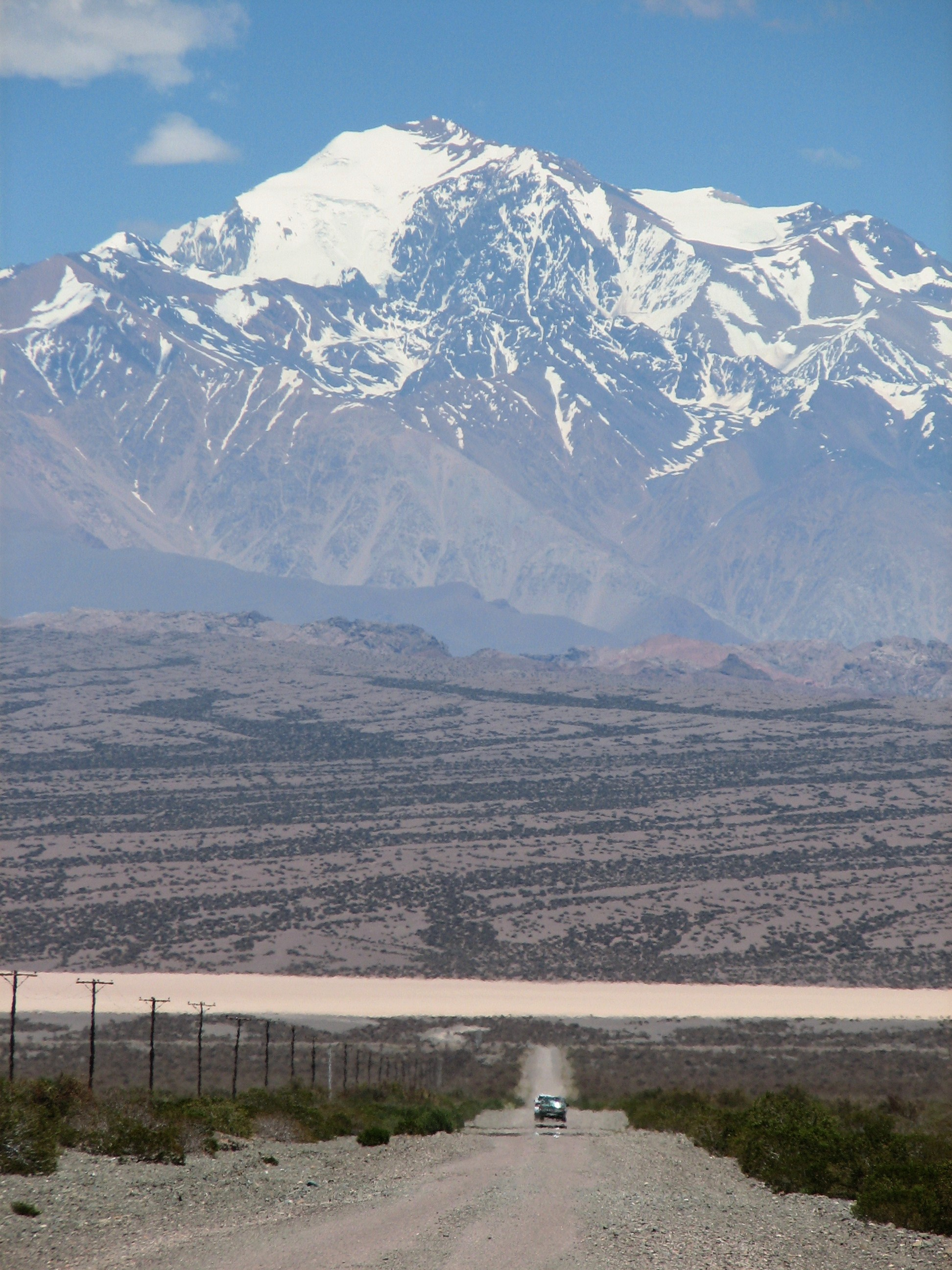
This mountain is located in El Leoncito National Park.

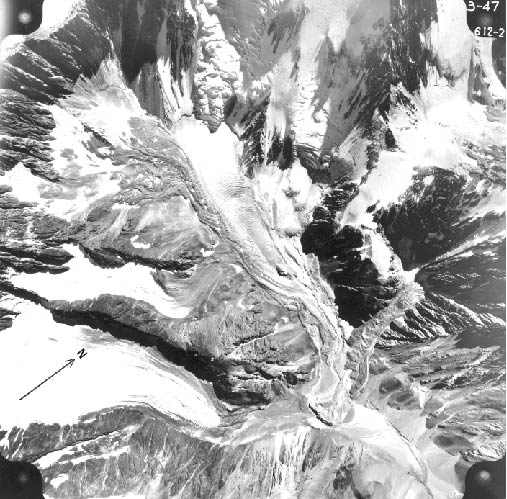
Vertical aerial photograph of glaciers on the southeast side of Cerro Mercedario.

== See also ==
- List of Ultras of South America
- List of peaks by prominence
