= Cordillera de la Ramada =

Mountain range in Argentina

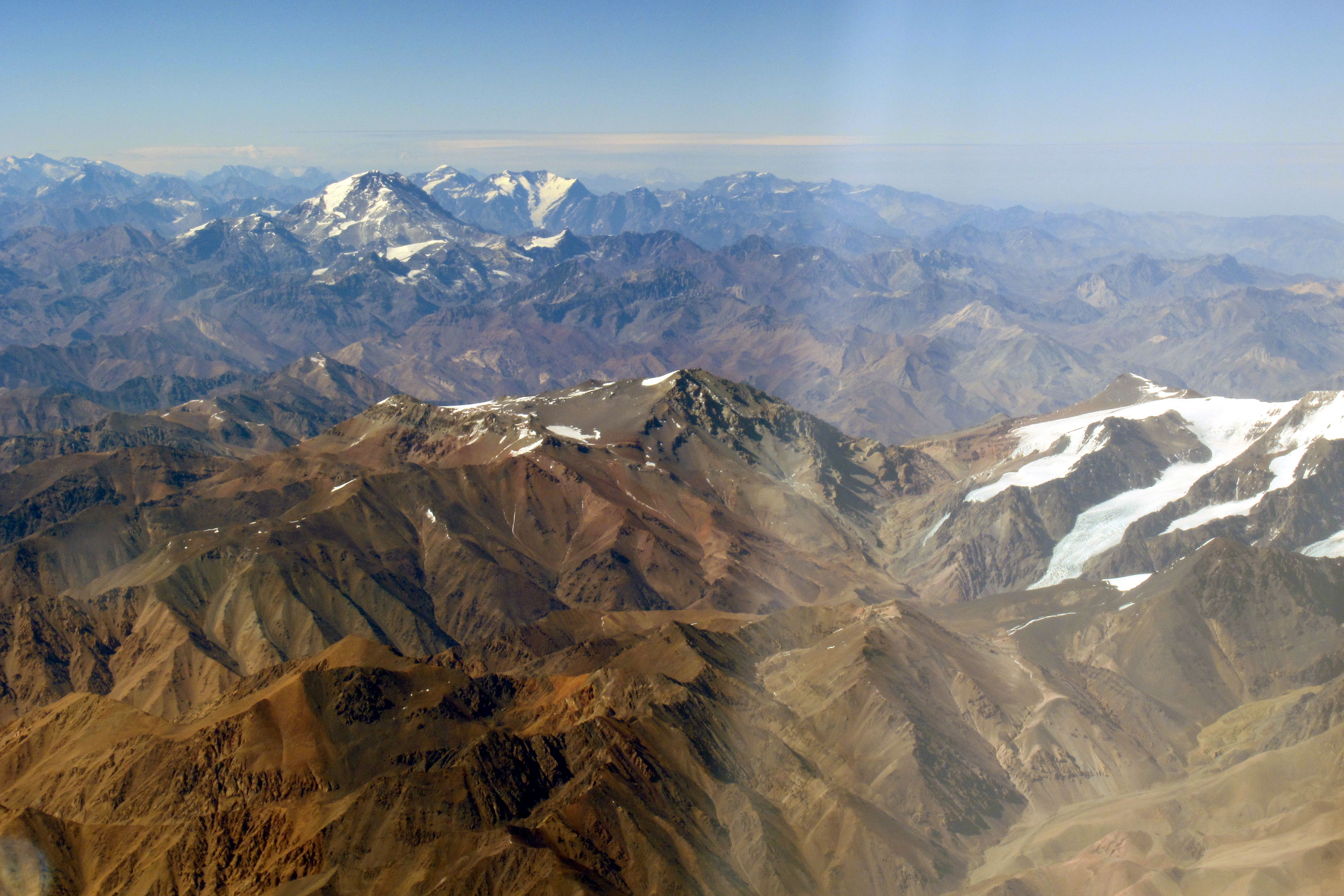
- Part of the Cordón de la Ramada at a glance with Cerro Ramada (6370 m a.s.l.) in the center.

Highest point
- Peak: Mercedario
- Elevation: 6,720 m (22,050 ft)
- Coordinates: 31°58′45″S 70°06′45″W

Naming
- Etymology: Spanish for "Range of the Shelter"

Geography
- Country: Argentina
- Range coordinates: 31°0′S 70°10′W
- Parent range: Principal Cordillera, Andes

The Cordillera de la Ramada (Spanish for "Range of the Shelter", also called Cordón de la Ramada, in which cordón means 'ribbon' or 'rope', is a mountain range in the San Juan province of Argentina, forming part of the Andes. Its highest peak is Mercedario at 6,720 metres (22,050 ft).

The first ascents of several peaks in the range were achieved by a Polish expedition of 1934 organized by the Tatra Society and led by Konstanty Jodko-Narkiewicz, whose party consisted of S. W. Daszynski, J. K. Dorawski, A. Karpinski, S. Osiecki, and W. Ostrowski. They climbed Mercedario, Alma Negra, Pico Polaco, La Mesa, and Cerro Ramada.

The range is clearly visible from the better-known Aconcagua, the highest mountain in the Americas at 6,962 metres (22,840 ft), which is 100 km south of Mercedario, with the result that some of the many climbers who frequent Aconcagua move on to this range, although the area is less easy to access.

Thanks to heavy cloud cover, the whole range has formed large glaciers which come to their lower ends at about 4,000 metres (13,120 ft). La Mesa, at 6,200 metres (20,340 ft), has especially huge glaciers and is not often climbed. Long ridge traverses are necessary to climb it.

Temperatures can be extreme in summer and winter, but the climate is stable in the autumn and the spring. The best time of year for climbing in the range is from mid-December to the end of February.

In the lower country beneath the range there are substantial mining industries, producing limestone, dolomite, bentonite, marble, aggregates, calcite and feldspar, as well as silver and gold. Paleontologists have found fossils here of some of the earliest dinosaurs, including the Herrerasaurus and Eoraptor lunensis. Local wildlife includes condors, rheas, guanacos and vicuña.

== Mountains ==
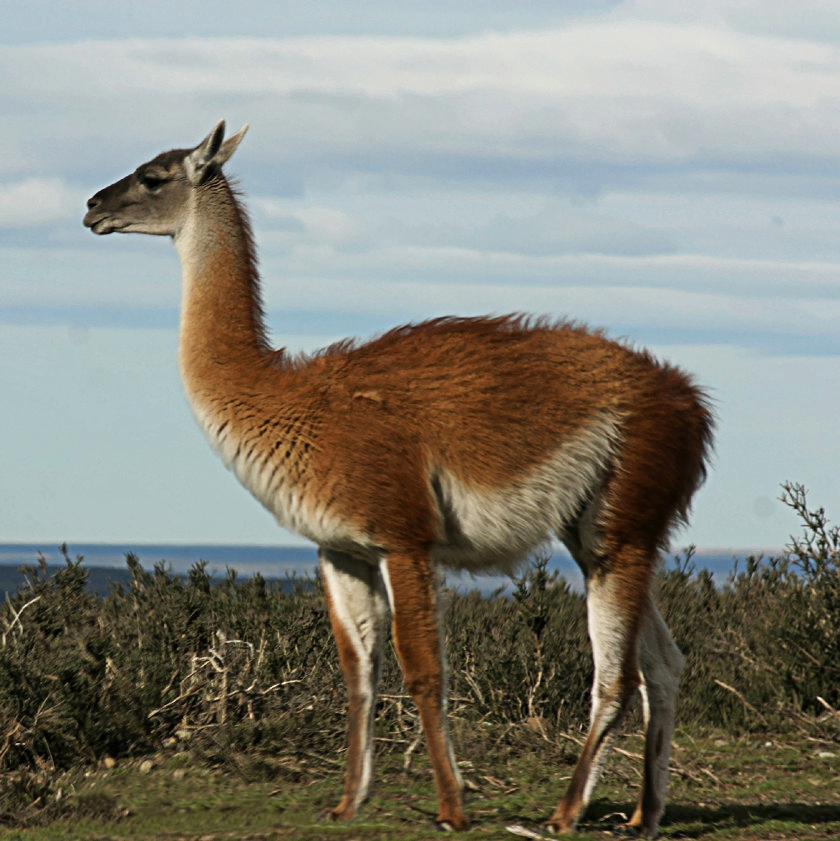
The guanaco, which runs wild in the area.

- Mercedario, 6,720 metres (22,050 ft), the eighth highest mountain of the Andes, known in Chile as El Ligua.
- Ramada Norte, 6,500 metres (21,330 ft)
- Cerro del Nacimiento, 6,493 metres (21,300 ft)
- Alma Negra, 6,290 metres (20,640 ft)
- Cerro Ramada, Argentina and Chile, 6,200 metres (20,340 ft)
- La Mesa, 6,200 metres (20,340 ft)
- Pico Polaco, 6,001 metres (19,690 ft)

== See also ==
- List of mountains in the Andes
