= Cerro Ramada =

Mountain in Argentina

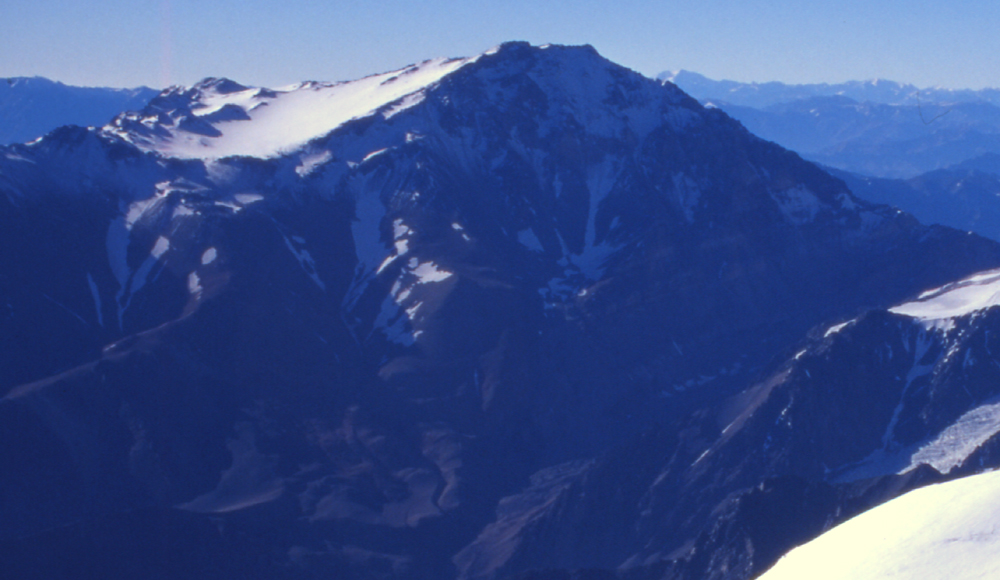
- Cerro Ramada as seen from Cerro Mercedario

Highest point
- Elevation: 6,384 m (20,945 ft)
- Coordinates: 32°05′S 70°01′W

Geography
- Location: Argentina - Chile
- Parent range: Cordillera de la Ramada

Climbing
- First ascent: 1934

Cerro Ramada is a mountain in the Cordillera de la Ramada range of the Andes, in Argentina. It has a height of 6,384 metres (20,945 ft).

The first recorded ascent of the mountain was made on 9 February 1934 by Konstanty Narkiewicz-Jodka, who led a Polish expedition.

== See also ==
- List of mountains in the Andes
