= List of volcanoes in Chile =

The Smithsonian Institution's Global Volcanism Program lists 105 volcanoes in Chile that have been active during the Holocene. The country's National Geology and Mining Service lists 90 active volcanoes.

The volcanoes of the Andes originate from the subduction of the Nazca Plate under the South American Plate, while the volcanoes of Chile's Pacific islands formed from magma coming from three distinct hotspots, Easter, Juan Fernández and San Felix hotspots. The westernmost part of the ridges formed by these hotspots contain the most recently active volcanoes. Some volcanoes or groups of volcanoes are under surveillance of the Southern Andean Volcano Observatory (Spanish: Observatorio Volcanológico de los Andes del Sur; OVDAS) because of their critical activity or proximity to big cities.

This list does not include Chilean claims in the Antarctic.

Name	Landform type	Elevation (m)	Last eruption	Coordinates	Other names	OVDAS surveillance
Tacora	stratovolcano	5,980	Upper-Pleistocene	17.72°S 69.77°W		
Carrizalillo (caldera)	Caldera		Cretaceous–Paleogene			
Potrerillos (caldera)	Caldera		Cretaceous–Paleogene			
Lexone	Lava dome	5,340	Holocene	17.87°S 69.48°W		
Choquelimpie	Stratovolcano		Miocene	18°18′19″S 69°16′42″W		
Lauca (volcano)	Stratovolcano	5,140	Pliocene	18°20′S 69°23′W		
Caldera Lauca	Caldera		Miocene			
El Rojo Norte	Cinder cone		Pliocene	18°28′S 69°12′W		
Cerro Napa	Stratovolcano		Pleistocene	20°30′S 68°40′W		
El Rojo Sur	Cinder cone		Pliocene	20°50′S 68°37′W		
Porunita	Cinder cone		3.5 million years ago	20°50′35.1″S 68°36′49.5″W		
Pabellón de Inca	Stratovolcano			20°55′S 68°37′W		
Cerro Cebollar		5,716	A few million years	21°37′S 68°28′W		
Cerro Chela	Stratovolcano	5,644	Pliocene	21°24′S 68°30′W		
Cerro de las Cuevas	Stratovolcano	5,294	3.15±0.15 million years ago	21°35′S 68°29′W		
Cerro Chanka	Lava dome		Pleistocene	21°47′09″S 68°18′37″W		
Cerros Bravos-Barros Negros	Volcanic complex		26-22 million years ago	26°38′S 69°15′W		
Chillahuita	Lava dome			22°10′S 68°02′W		
Chusmiza	Stratovolcano		Miocene			
Taapaca	stratovolcano	5,860	320 BC ± 50 years	18.10°S 69.50°W		
Corral de Coquena	maar, spatter rampart	4,572	Pliocene	23°26′S 67°28′W		
Cerro Alconcha	stratovolcano		more than 9.3 million years ago	21°04′S 68°32′W		
Apacheta-Aguilucho volcanic complex	Two volcanoes	5,581	50,000 years ago	21°50′S 68°10′W		
Parinacota	stratovolcano	6,348	Holocene	18.17°S 69.15°W		
Cerro Cariquima	stratovolcano	5,365	Pleistocene	19.55°S 68.68°W		
Acotango	stratovolcano	6,052	Holocene	18.37°S 69.05°W		
Wallatiri	stratovolcano	6,071	1960	18.42°S 69.17°W		
Arintika	stratovolcano	5,597	Holocene	18.73°S 69.05°W		
Isluga	stratovolcano	5,550	1913	19.15°S 68.83°W		
Puchuldiza		4,500	Pleistocene	19.42°S 68.97°W		
Cerro Pina		4,037	Holocene	19.49°S 68.65°W		
Tatajachura	stratovolcano	5,240	6 ± 1.3 million years ago	19.5°S 69.12°W		
Iru Phutunqu	stratovolcano	5,163	1995	20.73°S 68.55°W		
Millunu	stratovolcano		Miocene			
Guaichane-Mamuta	Volcanic complex	4,684	Miocene			
Cerro Ascotan	stratovolcano	5,500	1995	21°41′S 68°07′W		
Unnamed		4,800	Holocene	20.83°S 68.63°W		
Olca-Paruma	stratovolcano	5,407	1867	20.93°S 68.48°W		
Aucanquilcha	stratovolcano	6,176	Holocene	21.22°S 68.47°W		
Ollagüe	stratovolcano	5,868		21.30°S 68.18°W		
Cerro del Azufre	stratovolcano	5,846	Holocene	21.78°S 68.23°W		
San Pedro	stratovolcano	6,145	1960	21.88°S 68.40°W		
Paniri	stratovolcano	5,946		22.08°S 68.25°W		
Cerro del León	stratovolcano	5,760		22.18°S 68.12°W		
Linzor	stratovolcano	5,680		22.18°S 67.95°W		
Cerro Toconce		5,435	Holocene	22.20°S 68.10°W		
Cerro Deslinde		5,606		22°16′26″S 67°56′10″W		
El Volcán		5,100		22.33°S 67.97°W		
El Tatio		4,280	Pleistocene	22.35°S 68.03°W		
Tocorpuri (La Torta)	stratovolcano	5,018		22.50°S 67.90°W		
Putana	stratovolcano	5,890	1810 ± 10 years	22.57°S 67.87°W		
Chaxas	lava dome		1.09±0.56 mya	22°45′S 68°00′W		
Sairecabur	stratovolcano	5,971	Holocene	22.74°S 67.88°W		
Licancabur	stratovolcano	5,916	Holocene	22.83°S 67.88°W		
Guayaques	Lava domes	5,598	Holocene	22.88°S 67.58°W		
Purico Complex	Pyroclastic shield, Volcanic complex	5,703	Holocene	23.00°S 67.75°W		
Alitar	Stratovolcano	5,346	Holocene	23°09′S 67°38′W		
Acamarachi	stratovolcano	6,046		23.18°S 67.37°W	Pili	
Colachi	stratovolcano	5,631	Holocene	23.23°S 67.65°W		
Laguna Verde	stratovolcano	5,412	Holocene?	23.25°S 67.71°W		
Cerro Overo	maar	4,555	Holocene	23.35°S 67.67°W		
Tumisa	Lava domes	5,658	500,000 years ago	23°28′S 67°49′W		
Aguas Calientes	stratovolcano	5,924		23.37°S 67.68°W		
Lascar	stratovolcano	5,592	2022	23.37°S 67.73°W		
Chiliques	stratovolcano	5,778	Unknown	23.58°S 67.70°W		
Cordón de Puntas Negras	stratovolcano	5,852	Holocene	23.75°S 67.53°W		
Miñiques	stratovolcano	5,910		23.82°S 67.77°W		
Cerro Tujle		3,550	Holocene	23.83°S 67.95°W		
El Laco	Volcanic group	5,325 or 5,472	Pleistocene	23°50′29.6″S 67°29′24.6″W		
Cordón Chalviri	stratovolcano	5,623	Holocene	23.85°S 67.62°W		
Caichinque	stratovolcano	4,450		23.95°S 67.73°W		
Tilocalar	stratovolcano	3,116		23.97°S 68.13°W		
Pular	stratovolcano	6,233	Unknown	24.18°S 68.05°W		
El Negrillar	pyroclastic cone	3,500		24.18°S 68.25°W	See also Negrillar de Ensenada at the Osorno (volcano)	
La Negrillar	pyroclastic cone	4,109		24.28°S 68.60°W	See also Negrillar de Ensenada at the Osorno (volcano)	
Socompa	stratovolcano	6,051	5250 BC (?)	24.40°S 68.25°W		
Llullaillaco	stratovolcano	6,739	1877	24.72°S 68.50°W		
Volcan de la Pena	stratovolcano	5,247	12 million years ago	25°4.37′S 68°42.72′W		
Cerro Escorial	stratovolcano	5,447	Holocene	25.08°S 68.37°W		
Lastarria	stratovolcano	5,697	Holocene	25.17°S 68.50°W		
Chaco	volcano	5,045 or 5,145	Miocene	25°27′S 69°02′W		
Cordón del Azufre	stratovolcano	5,463	Holocene	25.33°S 68.52°W		
Cerro Bayo	complex volcano	5,401	Holocene	25.42°S 68.58°W		
Dos Crateres	Twin volcano		7.9±0.5 Ma	25°36′S 68°36′W		
Sierra de Gorbea	Lava field		4.7±0.5 Ma and 5.2±0.5 Ma	25°44′S 68°45′W		
Juan de la Vega	maar			25°52′S 68°48′W		
Chato Aislado	Caldera and lava dome		1.2 Ma	25.98°S 68.81°W		
Dos Puntas	Volcano		2 Ma	25°58′S 68°27′W		
Leon Muerto		4799	19,900,000 ± 800,000 years ago	25°57′S 68°28′W		
Salar Grande	Caldera		Miocene	26°00′S 68°40′W		
Doña Ines	Stratovolcano	5075	Miocene	26°04′40″S 69°11′06″W		
Los Colorados	Caldera		Miocene	26.09°S 68.32°W		
El Salvador			Paleocene-Eocene	26°17′30″S 69°32′30″W		
San Felix	Shield volcano	183	Holocene	26.27°S 80.12°W		
Sierra Nevada de Lagunas Bravas	stratovolcano	6,127		26.48°S 68.57°W		
Wheelwright caldera	caldera		Pliocene	26°45′00″S 68°37′30″W		
Falso Azufre	stratovolcano	5,890	Holocene	26.80°S 68.37°W		
Pukao	submarine volcano			26.95°S 110.27°W		
Ojos de Maricunga	stratovolcano and caldera	4,985	middle Miocene	27°00′S 69°13′W		
Incahuasi	stratovolcano and caldera	6,621		27.04°S 68.28°W		
El Solo	stratovolcano	6,190		27.11°S 68.72°W		
Pastillito	volcanic chain	4,883	Middle Miocene			
Ojos del Salado	stratovolcano	6,891	700 AD ± 300	27.12°S 68.53°W		
Poike, Easter Island	shield volcano	370	>1Ma	27.15°S 109.38°W		
Porquesa	Lava dome	4,600	Pliocene/Pleistocene	19°59′S 68°46′W		
Rano Kau, Easter Island	crater lake	250	>1Ma	27.15°S 109.38°W		
Terevaka, Easter Island	shield volcano	507	>1Ma	27.15°S 109.38°W		
Moai	submarine volcano			27.1°S 109.85°W		
Copiapó	stratovolcano	6,052		27.30°S 69.13°W		
Jorquera	caldera					
Tupungato	stratovolcano	6,570	0.8 million years ago	33.35°S 69.75°W		
Tupungatito	stratovolcano	6,000	1987	33.40°S 69.80°W		
Unnamed	submarine volcano	-642		33.62°S 76.83°W		
Robinson Crusoe	Shield volcano	922	1835	33.65°S 78.85°W		
Alexander Selkirk Island	volcanic island	1,329	<1Ma	33.75°S 80.75°W		
San José	stratovolcano	5,856	1960	33.78°S 69.89°W		
Maipo	stratovolcano	5,264	1912	34.16°S 69.83°W		
Palomo	stratovolcano	4,860	Holocene	34.61°S 70.30°W		
Tinguiririca	stratovolcano	4,280	1917	34.81°S 70.35°W		
Planchón-Peteroa	stratovolcano	4,107	2010	35.24°S 70.57°W		
Mondaca	Lava dome	2,048	Holocene	35.46°S 70.80°W		
Descabezado Chico				35.52°S 70.60°W	Cone of Calabozos	
Calabozos	caldera	3,508	Holocene	35.56°S 70.50°W		
Cerro Azul	stratovolcano	3,788	1967	35.65°S 70.76°W	Los Hornitos, Quipazu, Descabezado Grande	
Descabezado Grande	stratovolcano	3,953	1933	35.85°S 70.75°W	Cerro Azul, Quipazu, Hornitos	
San Pedro de Tatara		3,621	Holocene	35.99°S 70.85°W	San Pedro-Pellado	
Laguna del Maule	caldera	3,092	Holocene	36.02°S 70.58°W		
Longaví	stratovolcano	3242	Holocene	36.20°S 71.20°W		
Lomas Blancas		2,268	Holocene	36.29°S 71.01°W		
Resago	Cinder cone	1,550	Holocene	36.45°S 70.92°W		
Nevados de Chillán	stratovolcano	3,212	2021	36.86°S 71.37°W		
Antuco	stratovolcano	2,979	1869	37.40°S 71.34°W		
Copahue	stratovolcano	2,965	2024	37.85°S 71.17°W		
Callaqui	stratovolcano	3,164	1980	37.92°S 71.45°W		
Laguna Mariñaqui	Cinder cones	2,143		38.27°S 71.10°W		
Tolhuaca	stratovolcano	2,806	Holocene	38.31°S 71.65°W	Tolguaca, see also Lonquimay.	
Sierra Nevada	stratovolcano	2,554	Holocene	38.35°S 71.35°W		
Cerro Chapulul		2,143	Holocene	38.37°S 71.08°W		
Lonquimay	stratovolcano	2,865	1990	38.38°S 71.58°W	See also Tolhuaca or Tolguaca	
Llaima	stratovolcano	3,125	2009	38.69°S 71.72°W		
Sollipulli	caldera	2,282	1240 AD ± 50	38.97°S 71.52°W		
Caburgua-Huelemolle	stratovolcano	995	Holocene	39.20°S 71.83°W		
Cerro Redondo		1,496		39.27°S 71.70°W	Cone of Sollipulli, Cone of Caburgua-Huelemolle	
Villarrica	stratovolcano	2,847	2025	39.42°S 71.93°W		
Quetrupillán	stratovolcano	2,360	1872	39.50°S 71.70°W		
Lanín	stratovolcano	3,747	560 AD ±150	39.63°S 71.50°W		
Quinchilca	caldera		Pleistocene	39.68°S 72.008°W		
Mocho-Choshuenco	stratovolcano	2,422	1864	39.93°S 72.03°W		
Carrán-Los Venados	pyroclastic cones, maars	1,114	1979	40.35°S 72.07°W		
Mencheca		1,840	Holocene	40.53°S 72.04°W	Stratovolcano of Puyehue-Cordón Caulle	
Puyehue-Cordón Caulle	stratovolcano	2,236	2011	40.59°S 72.12°W		
Antillanca-Casablanca	pyroclastic cones, stratovolcano	1,990	Holocene	40.77°S 72.15°W		
Puntiagudo-Cordón Cenizos	pyroclastic cones	2,493	1930	40.96°S 72.26°W		
Osorno	stratovolcano	2,652	1869	41.10°S 72.49°W		
Cayutué-La Viguería	Pyroclastic cone	506	Holocene	41.25°S 72.27°W		
Calbuco	stratovolcano	2,003	2015	41.33°S 72.61°W		
Cuernos del Diablo	stratovolcano			41.37°S 72.02°W		
Yate	stratovolcano	2,187	Holocene	41.76°S 72.39°W	See also Hornopirén.	
Hornopirén	stratovolcano	1,572	Holocene	41.87°S 72.43°W	See also Yate	
Apagado (Hualiaque)	pyroclastic cone	1,210		41.88°S 72.59°W		
Huequi	stratovolcano	1,318	1920	42.37°S 72.57°W		
Michinmahuida	stratovolcano	2,404	1835	42.78°S 72.43°W	Minchinmávida	
Chaitén	lava dome	1,122	2011	42.83°S 72.65°W		
Corcovado	stratovolcano	2,300	1835	43.18°S 72.80°W	See also Yanteles.	
Yanteles	stratovolcano	2,050	6650 BC	43.50°S 72.80°W	See also Corcovado.	
Palena Volcanic Group	Cinder cone		Holocene	43.68°S 72.50°W		
Melimoyu	stratovolcano	2,400	200 AD ± 75	44.08°S 72.88°W		
Puyuhuapi	Cinder cone	255	Holocene	44.30°S 72.53°W		
Mentolat	stratovolcano	1,660	Holocene	44.67°S 73.08°W		
Cay	stratovolcano	2,200		45.06°S 73.00°W		
Maca	stratovolcano	2,960	Holocene	45.10°S 73.20°W		
Mount Hudson	stratovolcano	1,905	1991	45.90°S 72.97°W		
Río Murta (volcano)	pyroclastic cone			46.17°S 72.67°W		
Arenales	stratovolcano	3,437	1979	47.20°S 73.48°W		
Lautaro	stratovolcano	3,345	1979	49.02°S 73.55°W		
Viedma	Subglacial volcano	1,500	1988	49.36°S 73.28°W		
Aguilera	stratovolcano	2,546	1650 BC	50.17°S 73.83°W		
Reclus	stratovolcano	1,000	1908 AD ± 1	50.98°S 73.70°W		
Pali-Aike	volcanic field		5550 BC ± 1000	52.00°S 70.00°W		
Burney	stratovolcano	1,495	1910	52.33°S 73.40°W		
Fueguino	lava domes	150	1820	54.95°S 70.25°W		

== Gallery ==
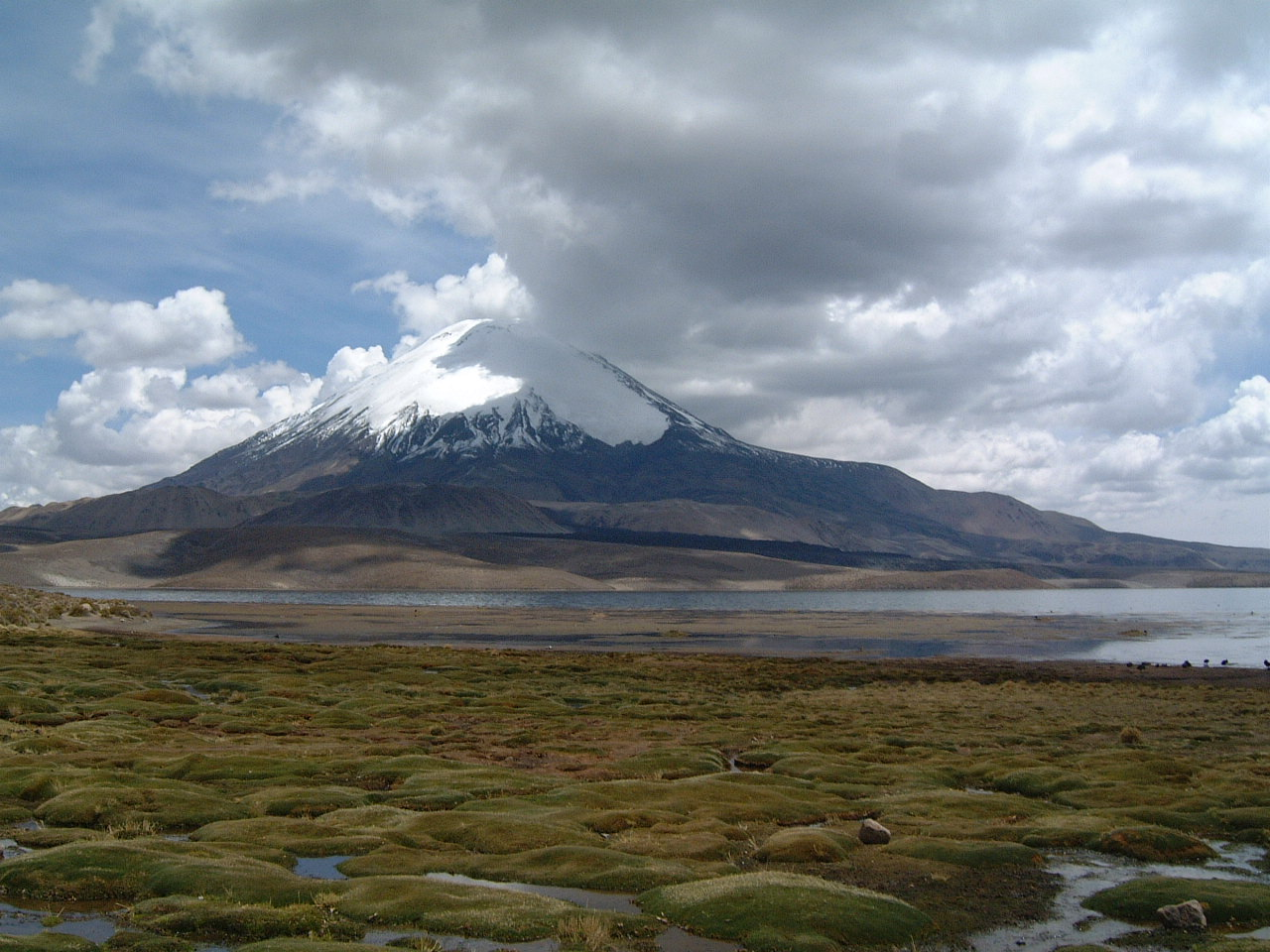
Parinacota and Chungará Lake

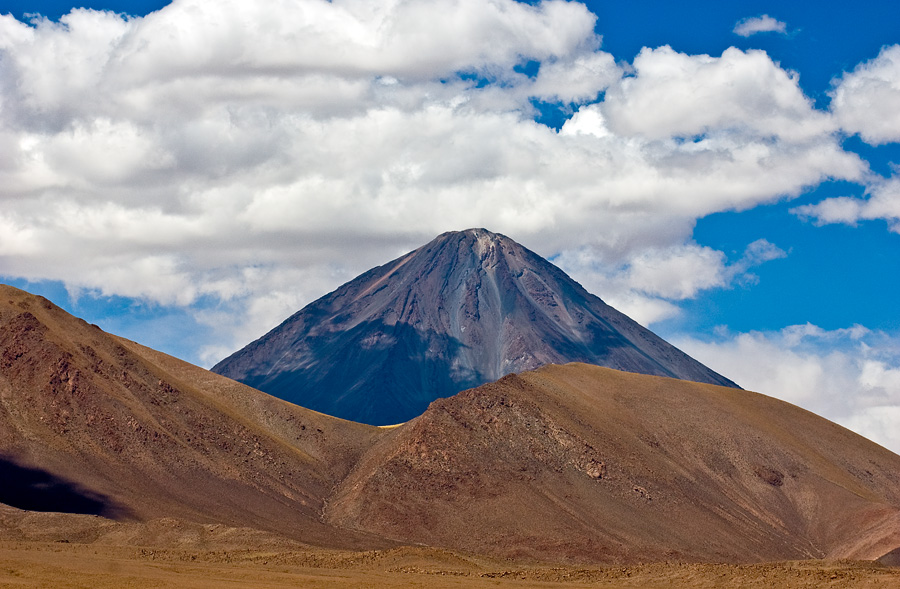
Licancabur's summit

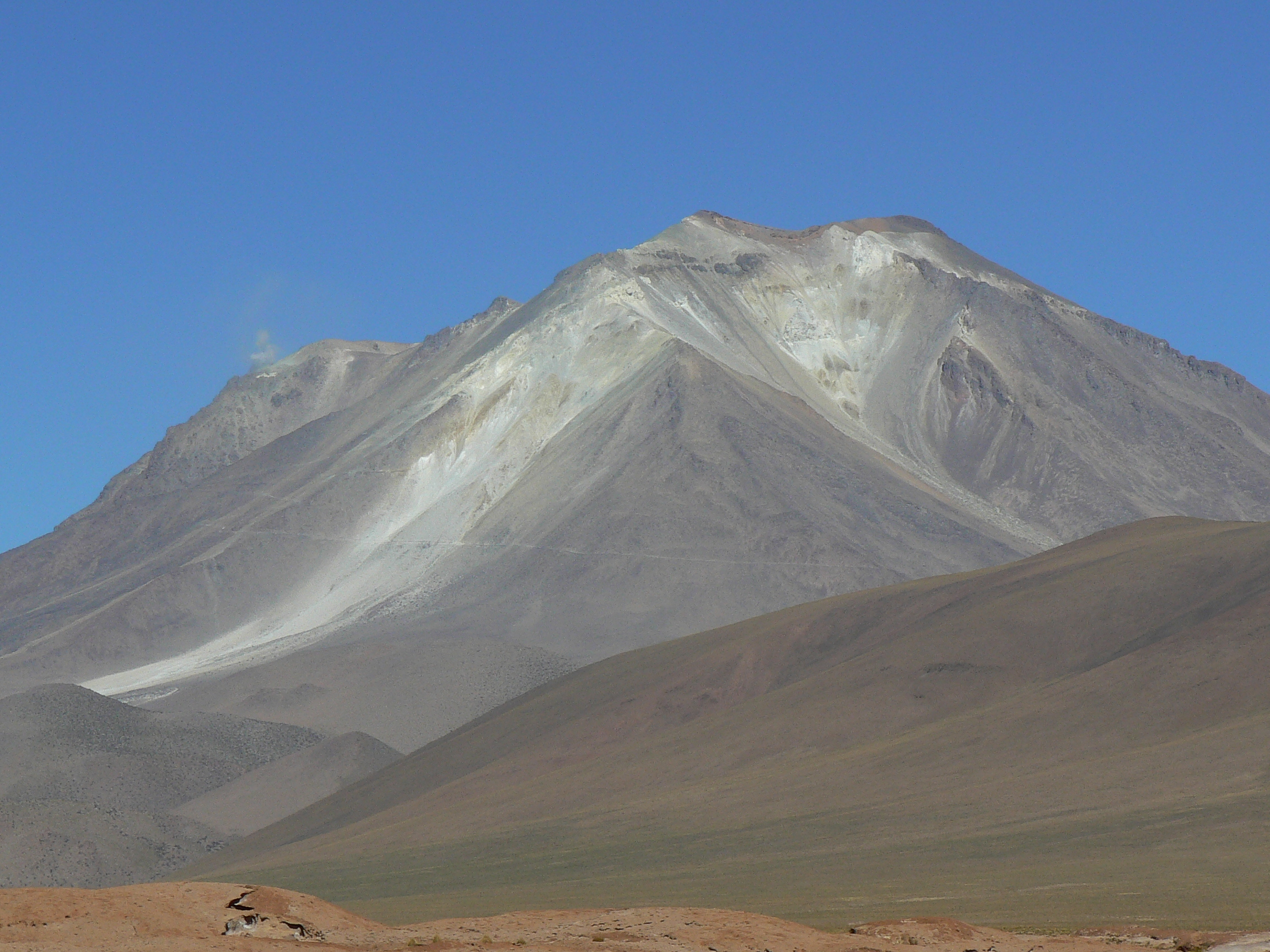
Ollagüe seen from Bolivia

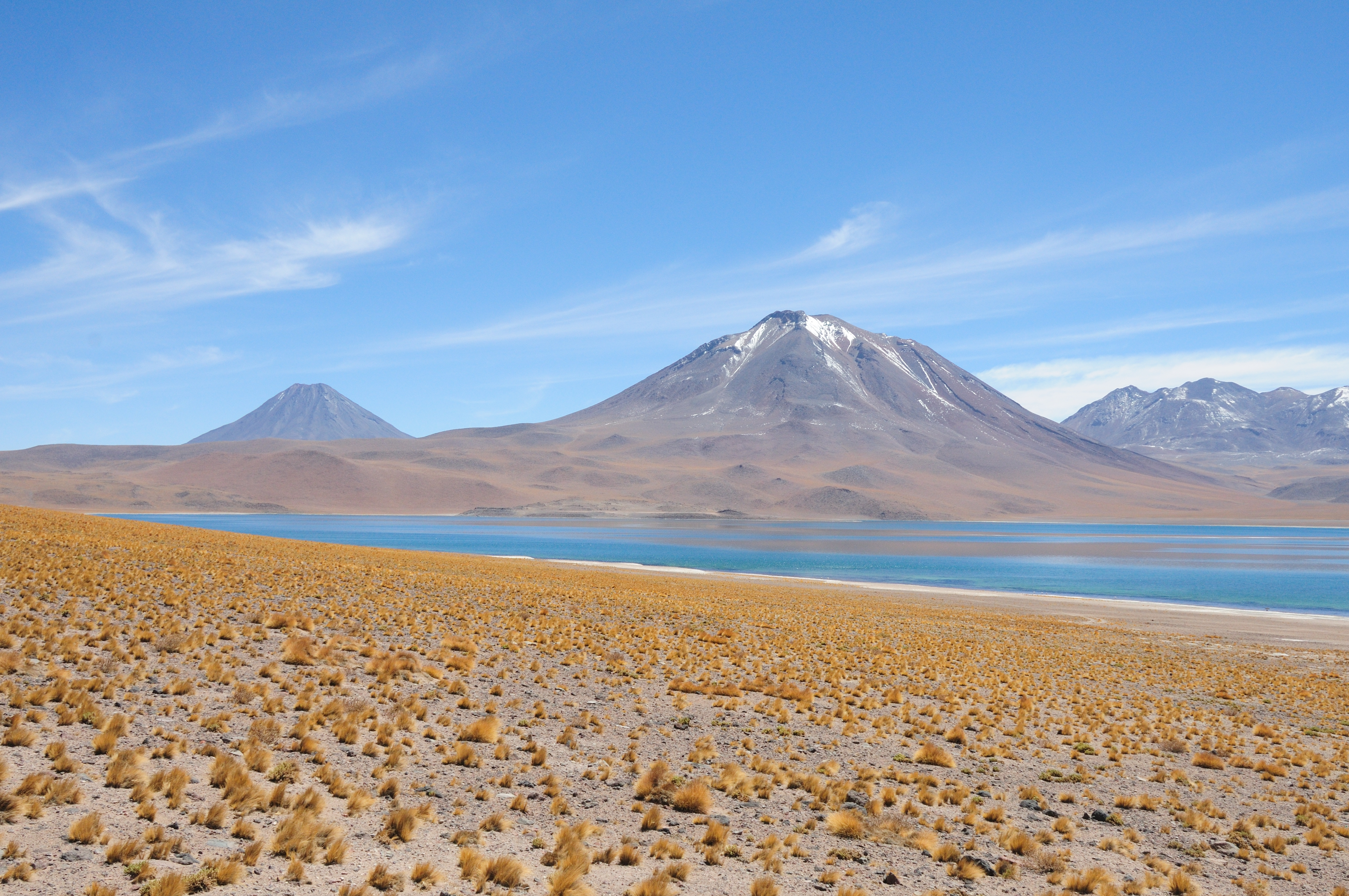
Miscanti and Laguna Miscanti

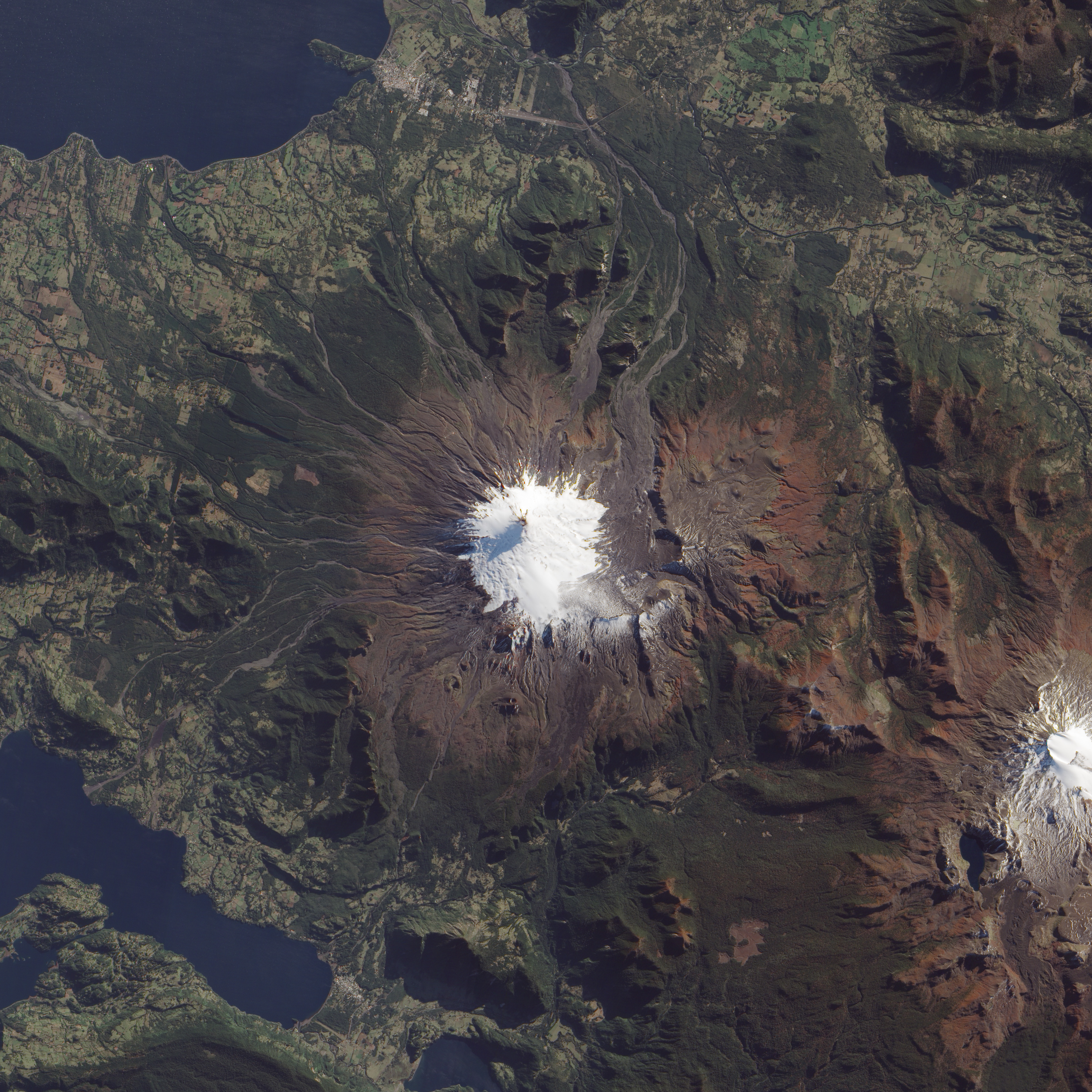
Satellite image of Villarrica, one of Chile's most active volcanoes

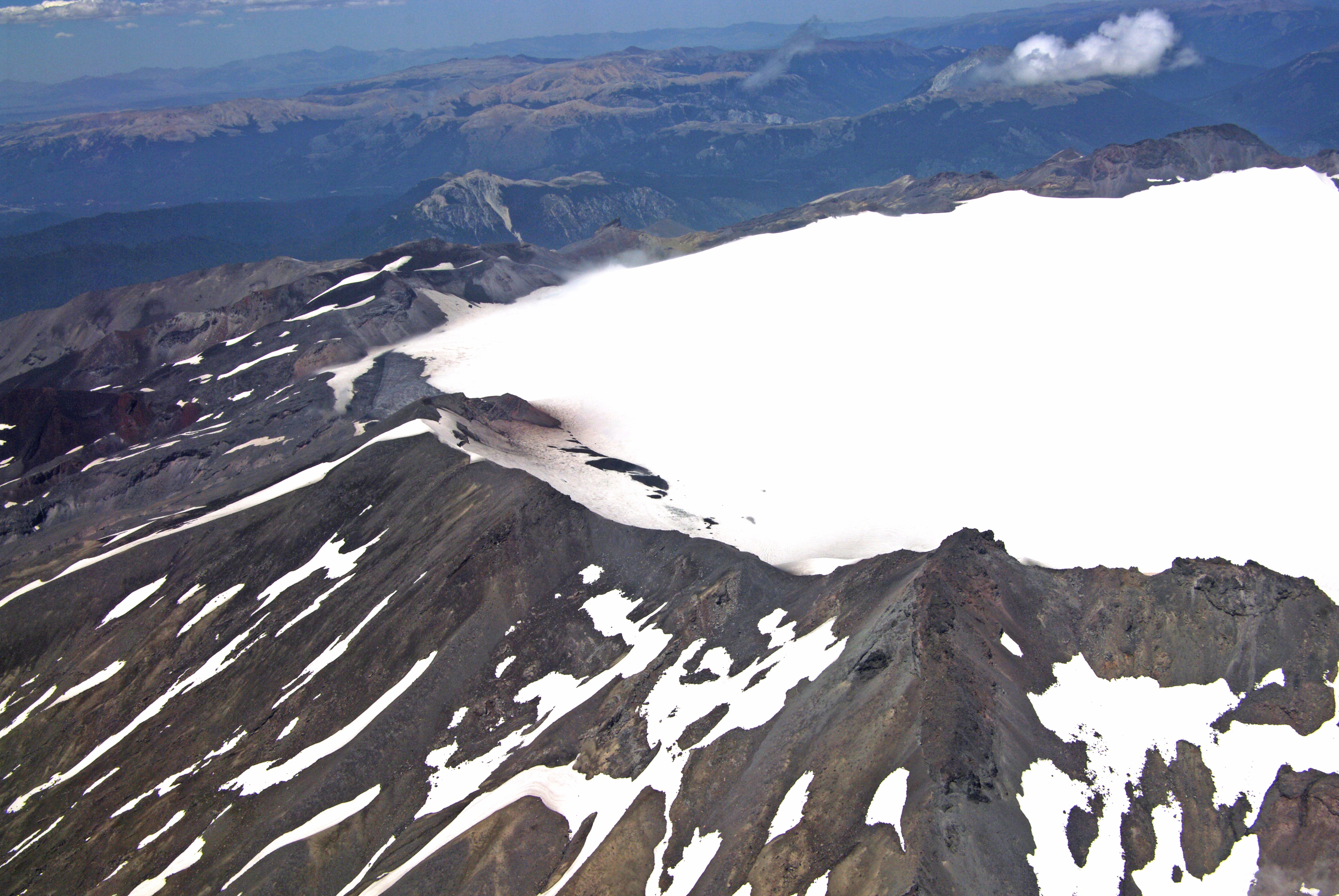
Aerial view of Sollipulli's ice-clad caldera

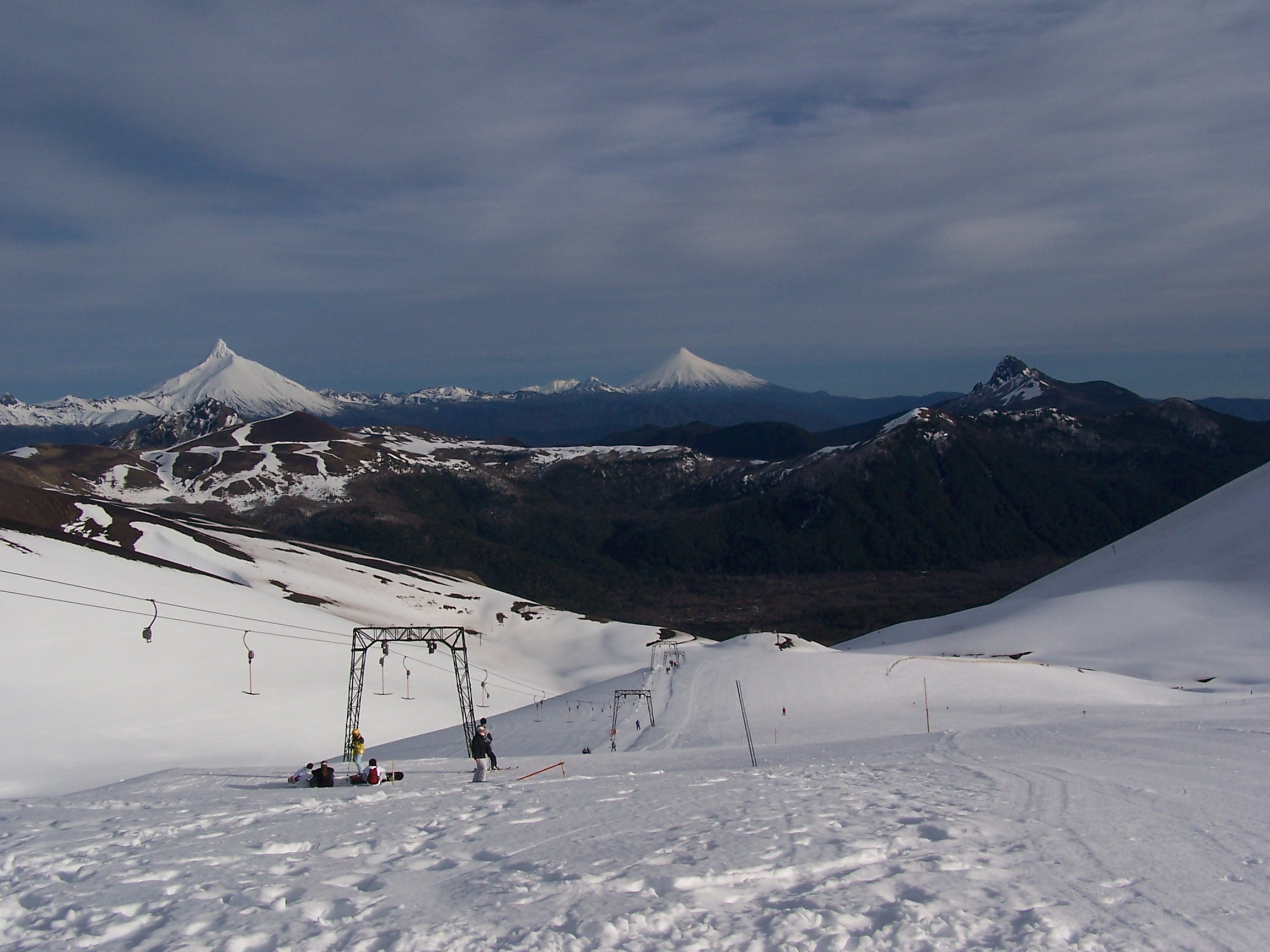
Ski slopes on the Antillanca Group, in the background: Puntiagudo and Osorno

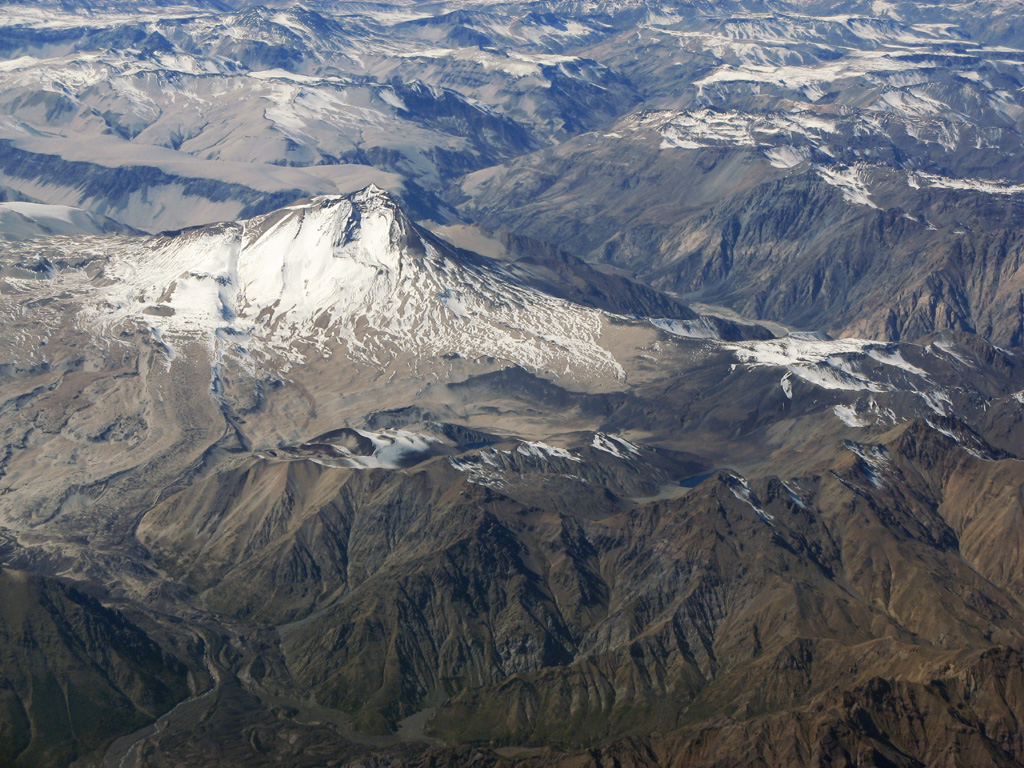
Aerial view of Cerro Azul

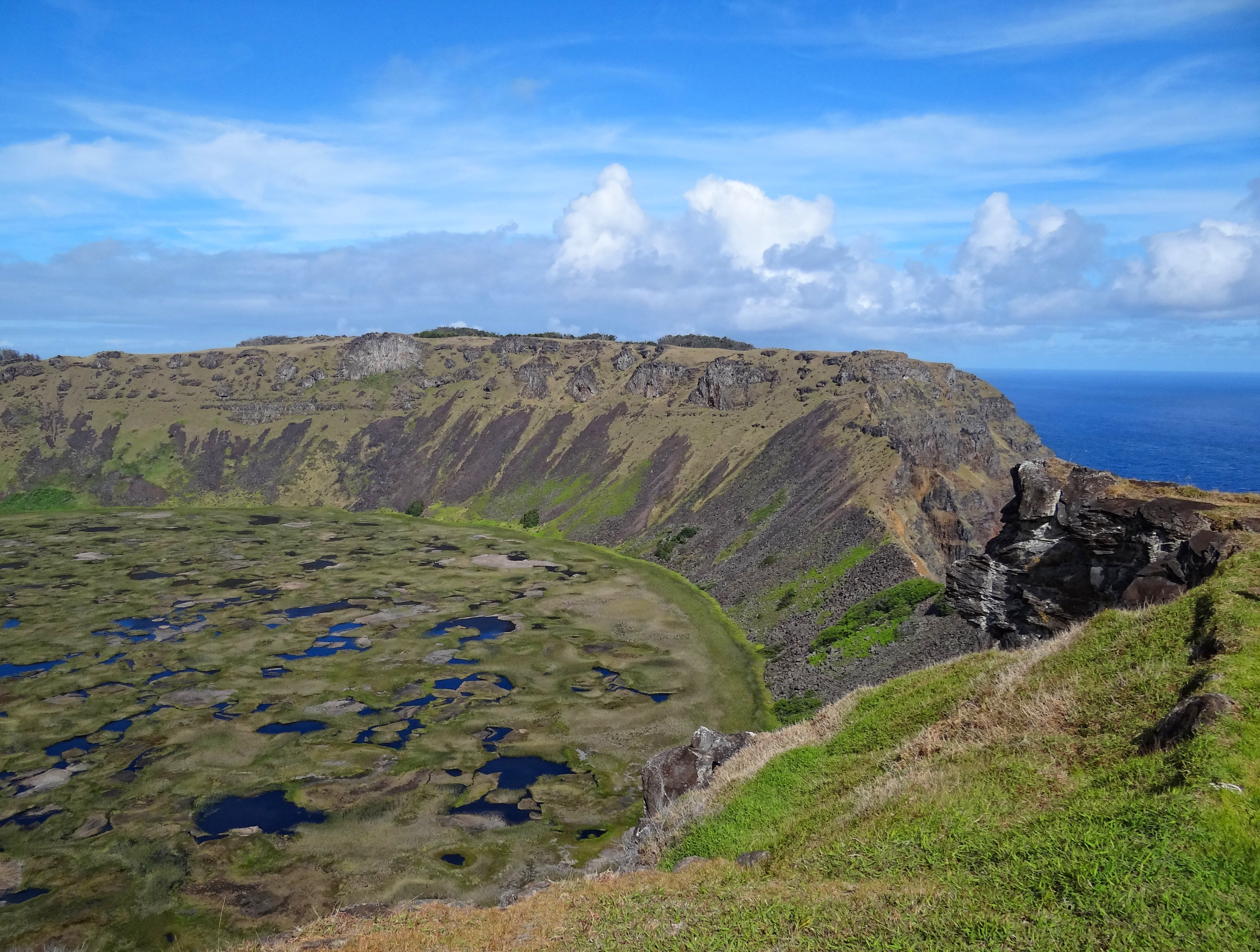
Rano Kau crater on Easter Island

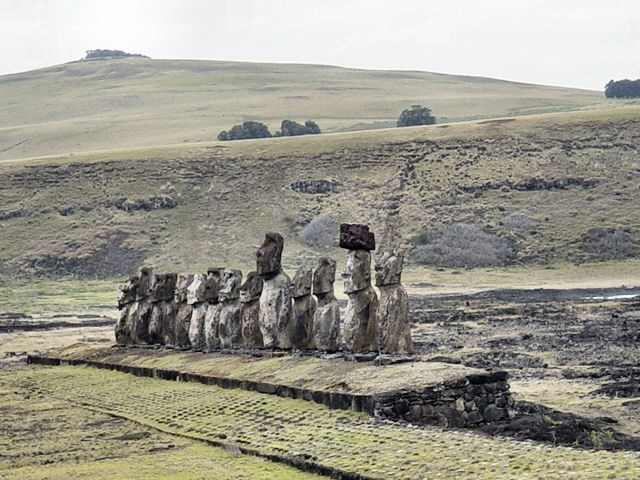
Poike volcano, in the foreground, Ahu Tongariki

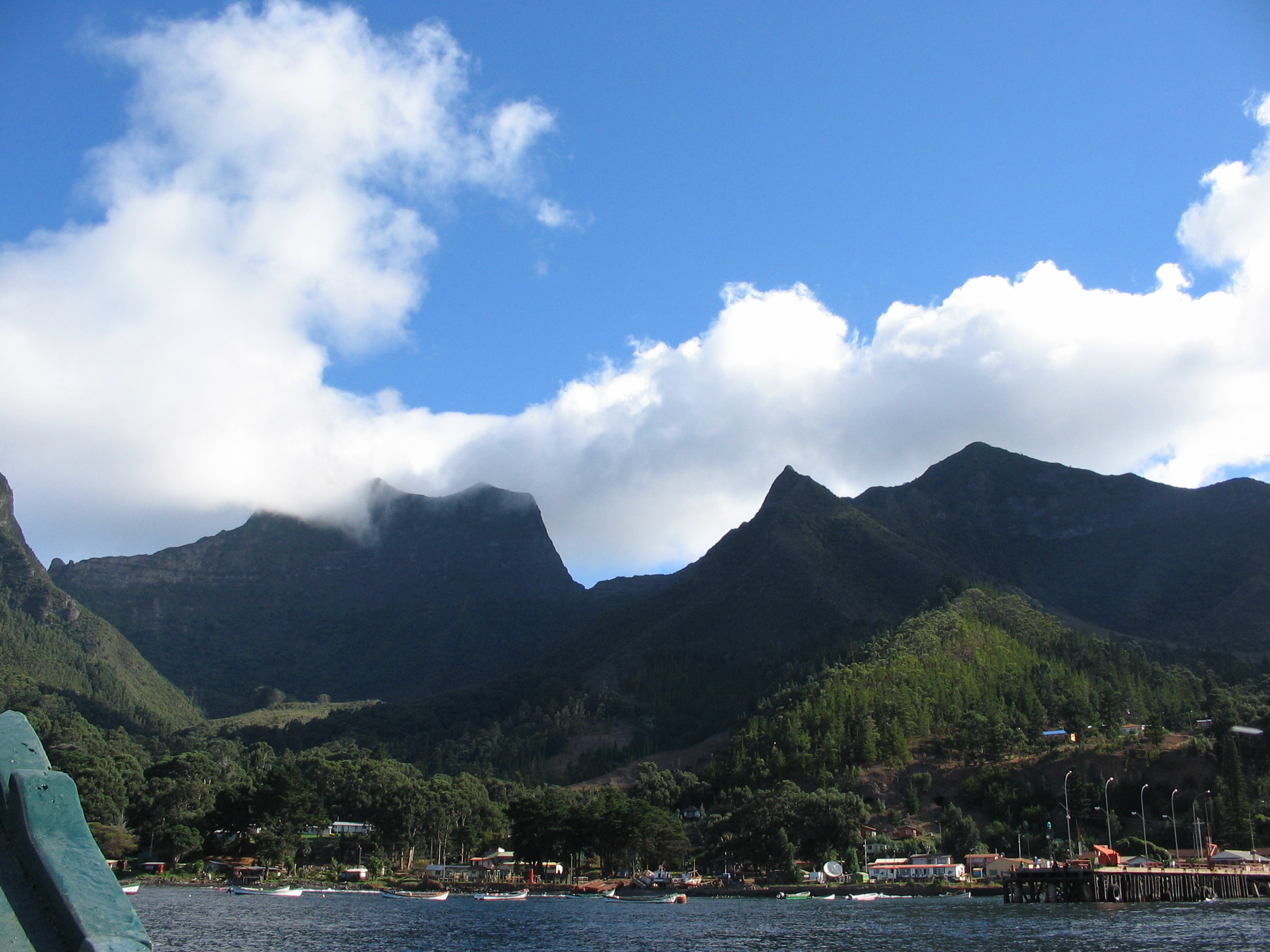
Eroded volcanic island of Robinson Crusoe

== See also ==
- Glaciers of Chile
- List of fjords, channels, sounds and straits of Chile
- List of islands of Chile
- List of lakes of Chile
- List of rivers of Chile
- Lists of volcanoes
- Ring of Fire
- Volcanism of Chile
