= Southern Andean Volcano Observatory =

The Southern Andean Volcano Observatory (Spanish: Observatorio Volcanológico de los Andes del Sur), also known by its acronyms as OVDAS, is part of Red Nacional de Vigilancia Volcánica, a program of the Chilean National Geology and Mining Service to watch the 43 most dangerous volcanoes of Chile. 2012 there were 30 volcanos under observation.

This is a list of the volcanoes with activity reports made by the OVDAS.

Name	Last eruption	Region	Coordinates	OVDAS webpage
Isluga	96000±6000 years BP	Tarapacá	19°07′S 68°49′W	
San Pedro	1960	Antofagasta	21°53′S 68°24′W	
Lascar	1993	Antofagasta	23°22′S 67°54′W	
Tupungatito	1959-60	Metropolitana	33°23′S 69°48′W	
San José	1932-33	Metropolitana	33°47′S 69°53′W	
Tinguiririca	1917	O'Higgins	34°49′S 70°20′W	
Planchón-Peteroa	2010	Maule	35°14′S 70°34′W	
Descabezado G.	1932-33	Maule	35°35′S 70°44′W	
San Pedro de Tarara	96000±6000 years BP	Maule	36°00′S 71°50′W	
Nevado de Longaví	Holocene	Maule	36°12′S 71°10′W	
Laguna del Maule	3000 years BP	Maule	36°59′S 70°35′W	
Nevados de Chillán	1973	Biobío	36°51′S 71°24′W	
Antuco	1853	Maule	37°24′S 71°21′W	
Copahue	1992	Biobío	37°52′S 71°10′W	
Callaqui	1980	Biobío	37.92°S 71.45°W	
Lonquimay and Tolhuaca	1990	Araucanía	38°23′S 71°35′W	
Llaima	2009	Araucanía	38°41′S 71°44′W	
Sollipulli	1240 A.D.	Araucanía	38°59′S 71°31′W	
Villarrica	2010	Araucanía, Los Ríos	39.42°S 71.93°W	
Quetrupillán	1650±70 BP	Araucanía, Los Ríos	39.5°S 71.7°W	
Lanín	2170±70 years BP	Araucanía, Los Ríos	39.7°S 71.5°W	
Mocho-Choshuenco	1864	Los Ríos	39°55′S 72°02′W	
Carrán-Los Venados	1955 AD	Los Ríos	40.35°S 72.07°W	
Puyehue-Cordón Caulle	2011	Los Ríos, Los Lagos	40°31′S 72°12′W	
Antillanca-Casablanca	2910 ± 150 years BP	Los Lagos	40.77°S 72.22°W	
Osorno	1869	Los Lagos	41°06′S 72°30′W	
Calbuco	2015	Los Lagos	41.32°S 72.60°W	
Yate and Hornopirén	?	Los Lagos	41°46′S 72°24′W	
Michinmahuida	17th century?	Los Lagos	42°48′S 72°26′W	
Chaitén	2008	Los Lagos	42°50′S 72°39′W	
Corcovado and Yanteles	6870±90 BP	Los Lagos	43°11′S 72°47′W	
Macá	9000 years BP	Aysén	45°06′S 73°10′W	
Melimoyu	200 AD ± 75 years	Aysén	44°05′S 72°53′W	
Mentolat	1850?	Aysén	44.70°S 73.08°W	
Hudson	1991	Aysén	45°54′S 72°58′W	

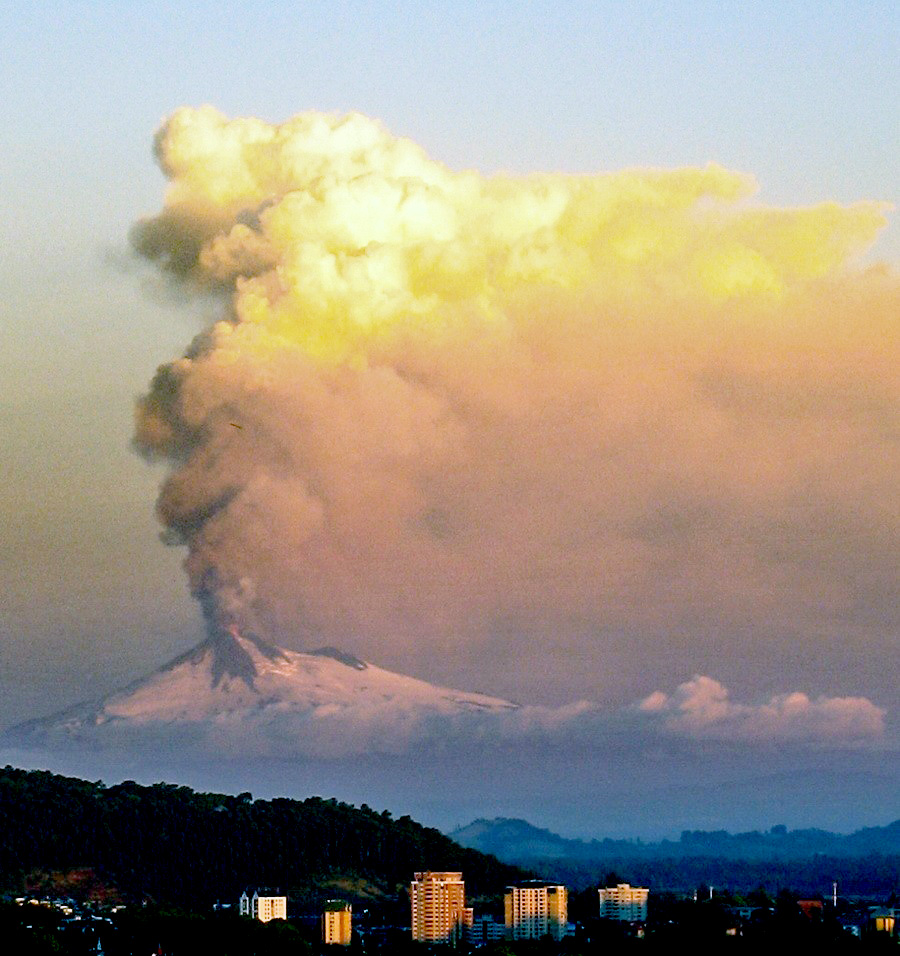
Llaima's 2008 eruption as viewed from Temuco

The headquarters are at Cerro Ñielol at Temuco from where there is good sight to Llaima and Villarrica, two of Chile's most active volcanoes. Much of the OVDAS work is made in collaboration with CONAF that administers the national parks and reserves where many volcanoes are located. The regional government of Araucanía Region also contributed to the project.

== See also ==
- List of volcanoes in Chile
