= Pabellón de Inca =

Volcano in Chile

Coordinates: 20°55′S 68°37′W

Pabellón de Inca is a volcano in Chile. Located in the Tarapacá Region, it rises 1,000 metres (3,300 ft) above the basement.

Volcanic activity in the region during the Eocene had formed the Icanche Formation, about 45 million years ago. After a pause of about 33 million years, volcanic activity resumed during the Miocene and continues to the present day. The volcanism included the Uijna and Carcote ignimbrites and the stratovolcanoes on the border between Chile and Bolivia.

Together with Irruputuncu and del Inca and Poruñita it is considered to be a young volcano. Lava flows and craters are no longer recognizable but the volcano maintains a conical shape. Other volcanoes in the area are El Rojo Sur and Olca-Paruma. Pabellón de Inca is not active.

Pabellón de Inca, Irruputuncu and Poruñita have erupted andesite and dacite. They contain hornblende and pyroxene.

The tree Polylepis tarapacana is found on Pabellón de Inca.
