= Millarca Valenzuela =

Chilean geologist and meteorite expert

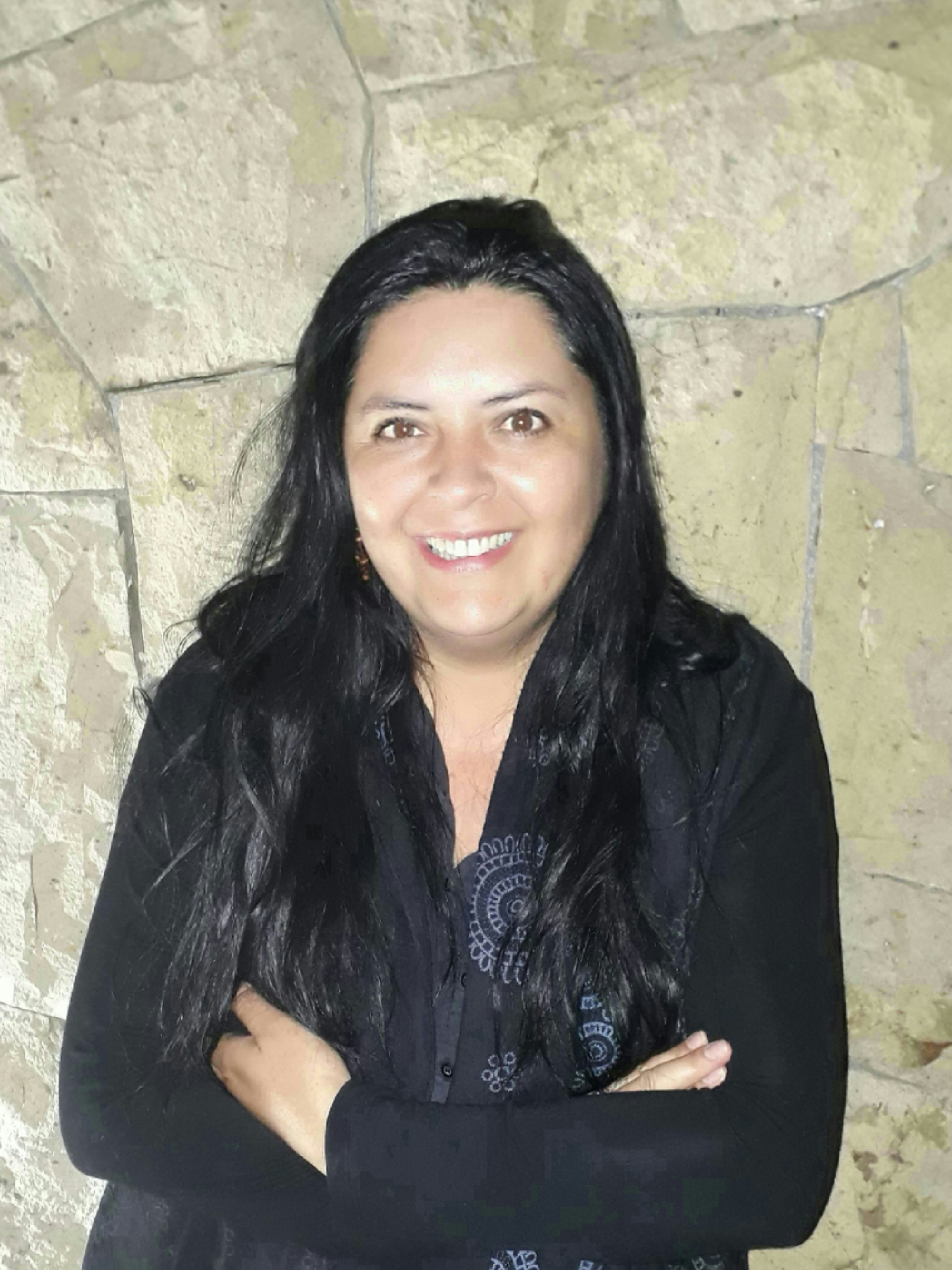
- Valenzuela in 2018
- Born: Antofagata, Chile
- Occupation: Geologist

Edith Millarca Valenzuela Picón is a Chilean geologist and meteorite expert. She has contributed to the study of meteorites that fall in the Atacama Desert in Chile.

== Biography ==
Millaraca Picón was born in Antofagasta, Chile in 1977. She studied geology at the University of Chile where she gained her PhD in the study of meteorological conditions of the Atacama Desert in 2011. She established the first national meteor monitoring and observation station in Chile - the Chilean Allsky Camera Network for Astro-Geoscience (CHACANA).

In 2009, she was elected to the Adolfo Ibáñez University business schools and El Mercurio young leaders network which recognises people who have made a significant impact in their field of work in Chile. In 2017, the asteroid 11819 was given the name Millarca in recognition of her work.

Since 2018, she is head of a unit at National Geology and Mining Service of Chile specialising in meteorites. She is also the Vice-President of the Geological Society of Chile.
