= Colachi =

Mountain in Chile

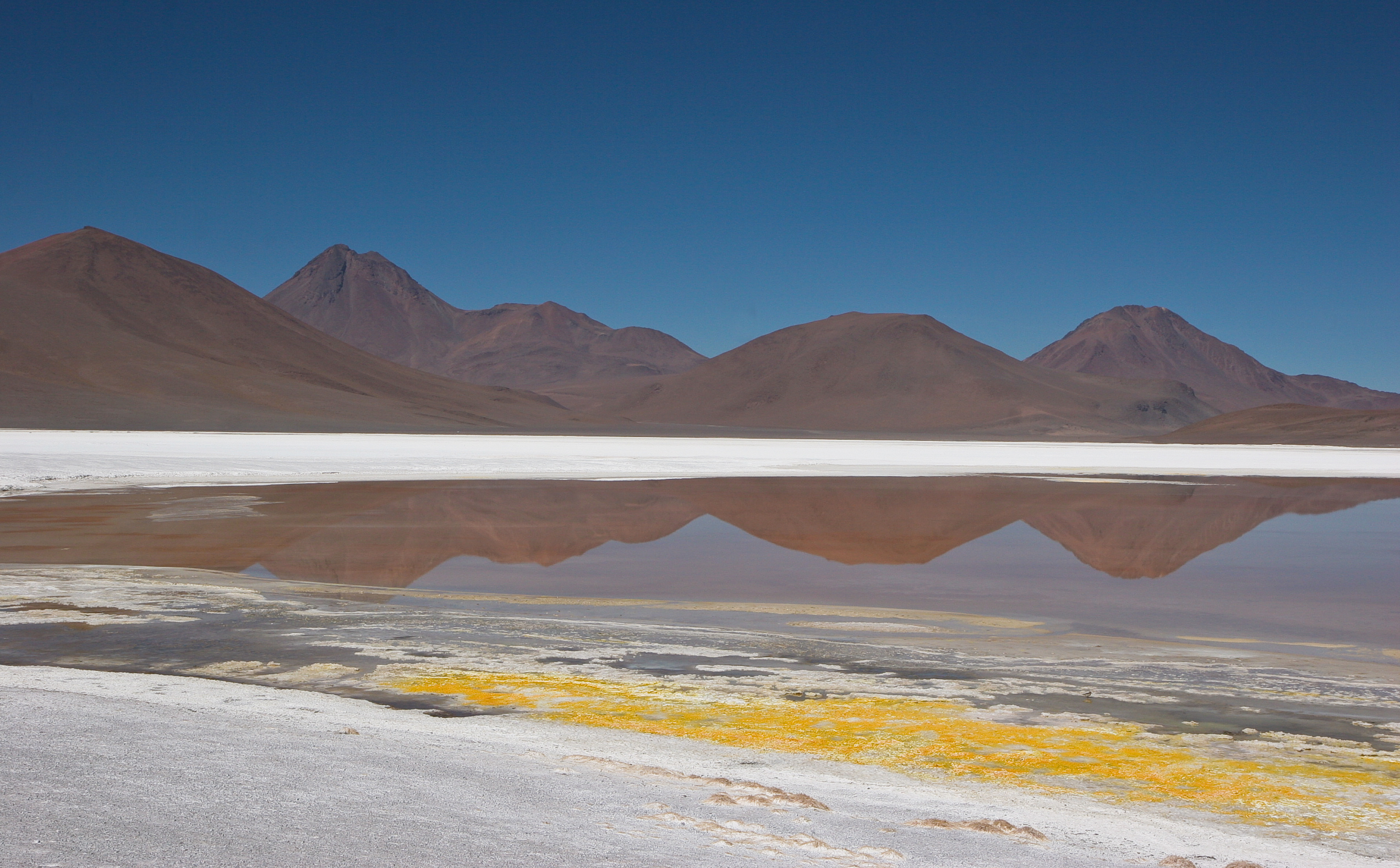
- Salar de Pujsa with Acamarachi and Colachi volcanoes in the distance. Colachi is visible in the rightmost portion of the image.

Highest point
- Elevation: 5,631 m (18,474 ft)
- Coordinates: 23°14′11″S 67°38′42″W

Geography
- Location within Chile
- Location: Antofagasta Region, Chile
- Parent range: Andes

Geology
- Mountain type: Stratovolcano
- Last eruption: Unknown

Colachi is a stratovolcano in the Antofagasta Region of northern Chile. It was built on a basement of ignimbrites. A 7 km² silicic lava flow lies on the saddle between the volcano and Acamarachi.

Colachi is part of a chain of stratovolcanoes stretching along the eastern side of the Salar de Atacama, the most active of which being Lascar.

== See also ==
- List of volcanoes in Chile
- Laguna Verde (volcano)
- Purico Complex
