= Laguna Mariñaqui =

Volcano in the Malleco Province of the Chilean Andes

Coordinates: 38.255°S 71.167°W

Laguna Mariñaqui is a volcano in the Malleco Province of the Chilean Andes.

The volcano consists of two craters located along a fault zone two kilometers (1.2 miles) apart with associated pyroclastic material and andesitic lava flows on a high plateau at an elevation of 2,000–2,300 metres (6,600–7,500 ft). Cerro Chapulul is an associated cinder cone that was formed during the Holocene.

The stratovolcanoes of Copahue and Tolguaca respectively lie to the north and south-southwest of the Laguna Mariñaqui system.
