= Potrerillos (caldera) =

Caldera in Chile

Potrerillos is a caldera in Chile, in the Atacama Region.

Potrerillos has a diameter of 10 kilometres (6.2 mi) and is filled by ash flows and andesitic, basaltic and rhyolitic lava flows. The caldera was active 65-56 million years ago. It and the neighbouring Cerro Vicuña and El Salvador calderas form the Indio Muerto volcanic complex, which was influenced by local faults. Later Eocene volcanism formed the rhyolitic Potrerillos lava dome.

== Sources ==
- Rivera, O. M.; Falcón, M.F. "CALDERAS TIPO COLAPSO-RESURGENTES DEL TERCI ARIO INFERIOR EN LA PRE-CORDILLERA DE LA REGION DE ATACAMA: EMPLAZAMIENTO DE COMPLEJOS VOLCANO-PLUTONICOS EN LAS CUENCAS VOLCANO-TECTONICAS EXTENSIONALES HORNITOS E INDIO MUERTO" (PDF). tienda.sernageomin.cl (in Spanish). Puerto Varas: SERNAGEOMIN. Archived from the original (PDF) on 4 March 2016.
