= Porunita =

Inactive volcano in Chile

Coordinates: 20°50′35.1″S 68°36′49.5″W

Porunita is an inactive volcano in Chile.

It is a cinder cone which rises 90 metres (300 ft) above the surrounding plain and has a diameter of 800 metres (2,600 ft). The cone was constructed by andesite pyroclastic material and features a summit crater. The cone was formed 3.5 million years ago and has been degraded by erosion since then.

== Sources ==
- Vergara, Hernan L. "El vulcanismo superior en un sector Andino del Norte Grande de Chile" (PDF). SERNAGEOMIN (in Spanish). p. 175. Archived from the original (PDF) on 2015-11-25.
- Gardeweg, M.; Selles, D.; Arcos, R.; Pino, H.; Camacho, J.; Sprohnle, C.; Sanhueza, A.; Mont, A. "Volcanismo del Cenozoico tardío al este de Collahuasi, Región de Tarapacá, Chile" (PDF). SERNAGEOMIN (in Spanish). p. 3. Archived from the original (PDF) on November 25, 2015.
