= Volcan de la Pena =

Volcano in Chile

Coordinates: 25°4.37′S 68°42.72′W

Volcan de la Pena is a volcano in Chile.

Volcan de la Pena is part of the High Andes of Chile, between 25° and 26°30′ degrees south. The Andes there at altitudes over 3,500 metres (11,500 ft) feature a number of volcanoes, as well as products of eruptive activity. The Salar Grande lies east of Chato Aislado. Chato Aislado has been proposed as a geosite location for Chile.

Volcan de la Pena is a 5,247-metre-high (17,215 ft) cone that rises from a Miocene ignimbrite plateau, northeast of the Salar de Pajonales. The 12 million-year-old cone is capped off by a lava dome and has been affected by numerous sector collapses in the past, which have generated hummocky deposits. The largest collapse has a volume of 2.31 cubic kilometres (0.55 cu mi). Most of these deposits are degraded, as are the collapse scars. The total volume of the otherwise little eroded edifice is about 31 cubic kilometres (7.4 cu mi).

== Sources ==
- Villa, Victor (October 2015). "Evaluación preliminar de geositios en la Alta Cordillera de Chile, entre los 25º y 26º S" (PDF). SERNAGEOMIN (in Spanish). La Serena, Chile: XIV Chilean Geological Congress. Archived from the original (PDF) on 10 January 2017.
