= Chato Aislado =

Volcano in Chile

Coordinates: 25.98°S 68.81°W

Chato Aislado is a volcano in Chile.

Chato Aislado is part of the High Andes of Chile, between 25° and 26°30′ degrees south. The Andes there at altitudes over 3,500 metres (11,500 ft) feature a number of volcanoes, as well as products of eruptive activity. The Salar Grande lies east of Chato Aislado. Chato Aislado has been proposed as a geosite location for Chile.

Chato Aislado features a caldera formed by explosive activity. This caldera has a diameter of 5 kilometres (3.1 mi). Ignimbrites with thicknesses of more than 179 metres (587 ft) are exposed in the caldera, and crop out over a surface area of 105.04 square kilometres (40.56 sq mi). These ignimbrites are of dacitic composition, rich in crystals and pumice and display no welding. A lava dome within the caldera reaches a height of 180 metres (590 ft), it shows traces of a collapse on its eastern flank.

Chato Aislado is of Pleistocene age. The ignimbrite has been dated 1.2 million years ago. The caldera was formed within the ignimbrites erupted early in the volcano's history. The last activity generated the lava dome.

== Sources ==
- Villa, Victor (October 2015). "Evaluación preliminar de geositios en la Alta Cordillera de Chile, entre los 25º y 26º S" (PDF). SERNAGEOMIN (in Spanish). La Serena, Chile: XIV Chilean Geological Congress. Archived from the original (PDF) on 10 January 2017.
