= Malalcahuello-Nalcas =

Nature reserve in Chile

Coordinates: 38.35°S 71.55°W

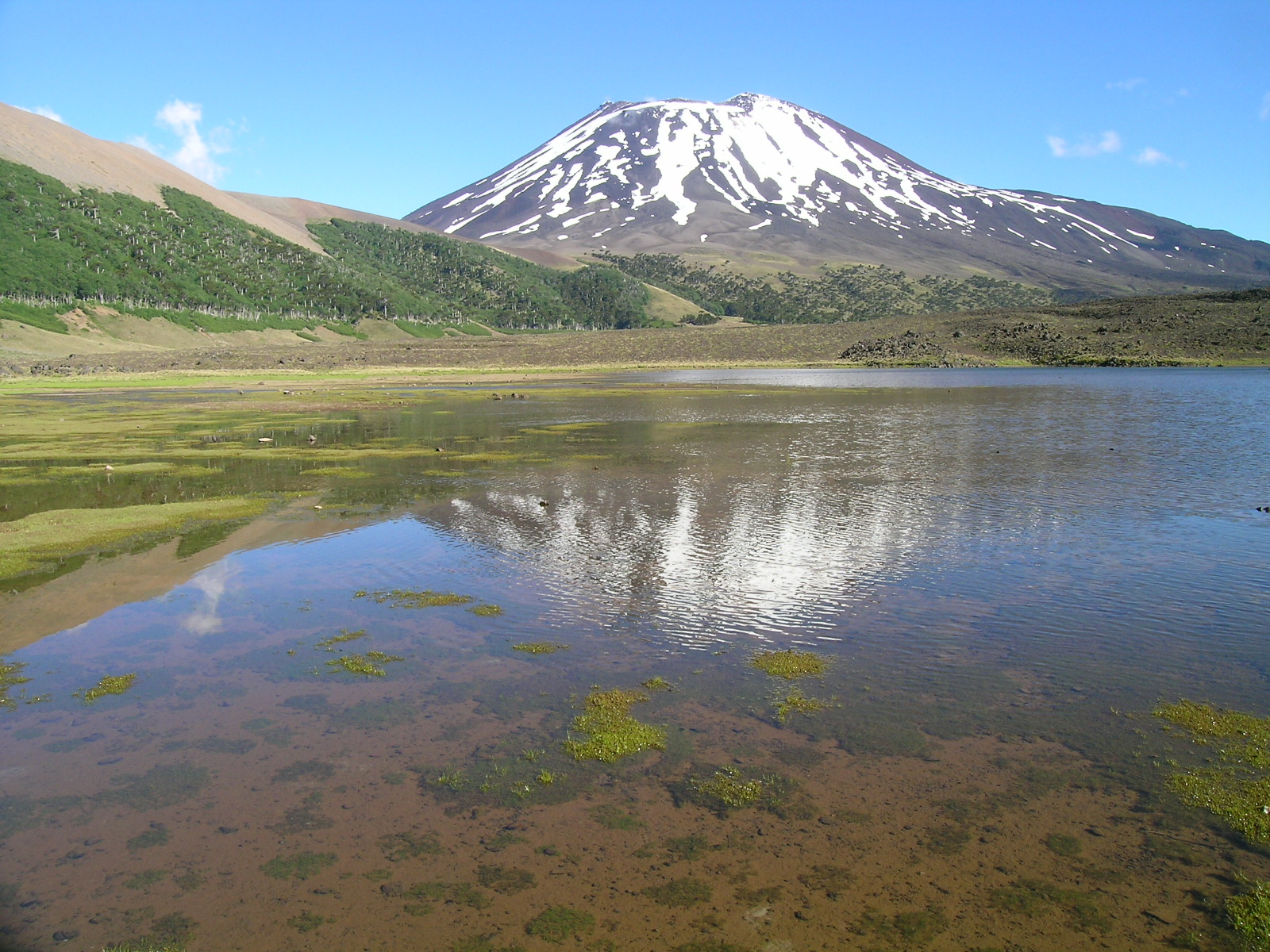
Lonquimay

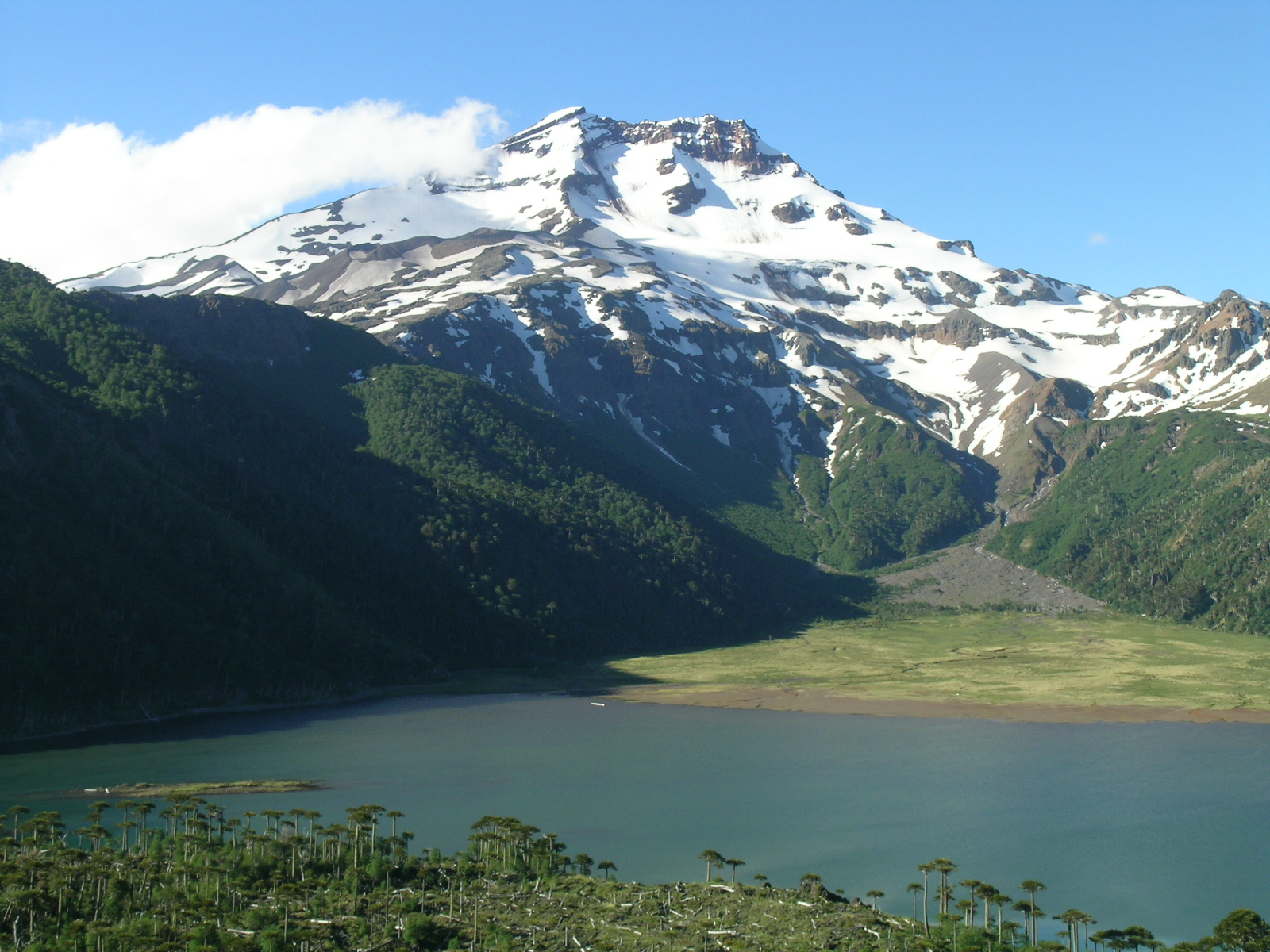
Tolhuaca

Malalcahuello-Nalcas is a protected area comprising two adjoining national reserves: Malalcahuello and Nalcas. It is located in the Andes, in the Araucanía Region of Chile and bordering the Bío-Bío Region.

The landscape of the area is dominated by the volcanoes Lonquimay and Tolhuaca.

The combined Reserva Nacional Malalcahuello-Nalcas covers 313 km^{2}, with the boundary between the Reserva Nacional Nalcas (to the north) and the Reserva Nacional Malalcahuello (to the south) crossing the summit of Lonquimay.

Sandy volcanic soil covers much of the area, with large forested areas dominated by araucaria trees. Widespread logging took place in the 1950s.

A number of trekking paths can be followed, including a route encircling Lonquimay. Many of these start from the administrative centre of the reserve, operated by CONAF, at the village of Malalcahuello.
