= Olca-Paruma =

Volcanic complex in Chile

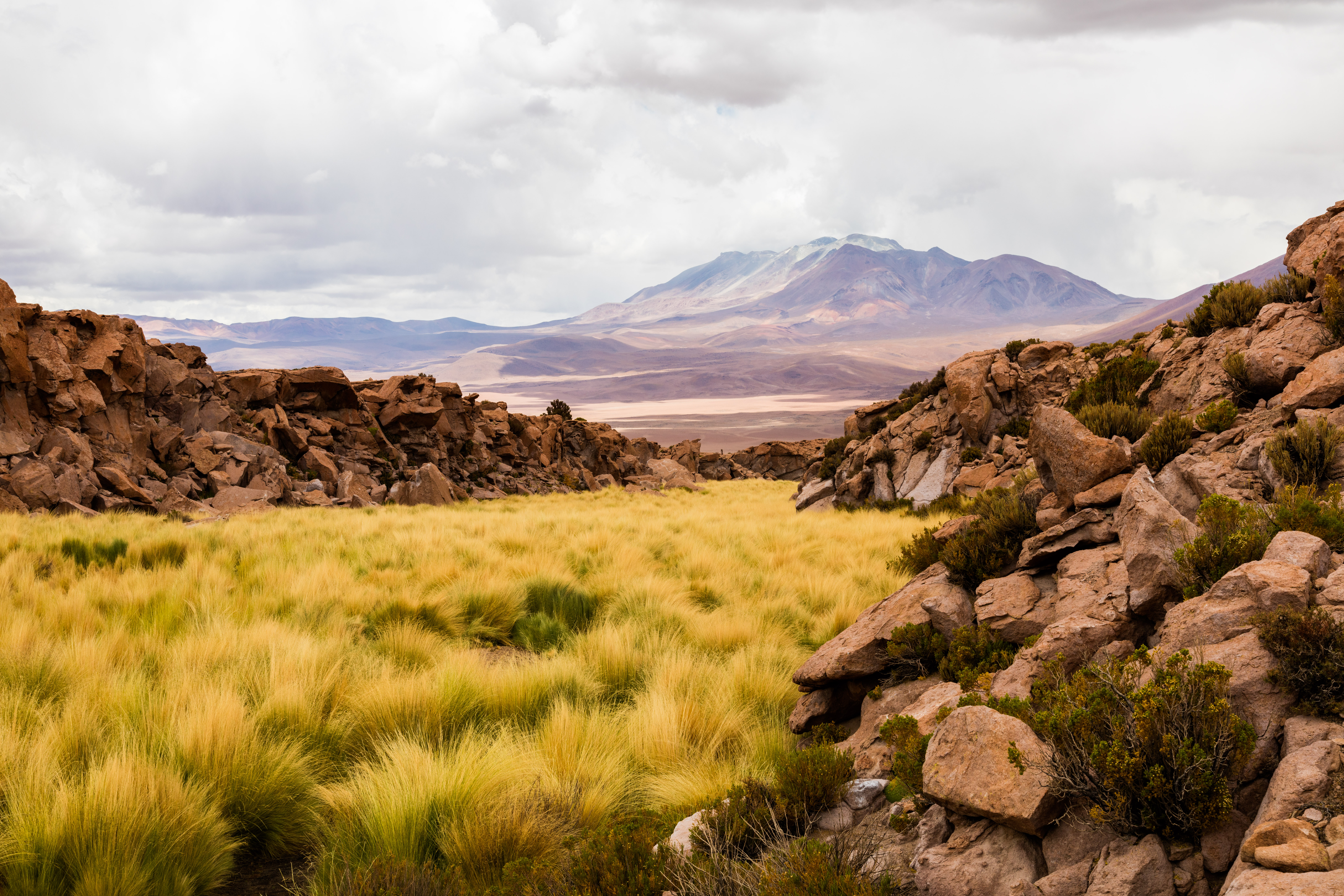
Olca volcano lies in the background.

Olca-Paruma is a volcanic complex in Chile. Lying on the border between Chile and Bolivia, it is formed by an east–west alignment of volcanoes. From west to east, these are Cerro Paruma, Volcan Paruma, Olca, and Mencheca or Michincha. Aside from the mines of Ujina, Rosario, and Quebrada Blanca, the area is sparsely populated.

These volcanoes have erupted mainly lava flows, which descend their slopes. The volcanoes range in shape from long and narrow to short and stubby. Craters are found on the volcanoes. Eruptive activity commenced during the Pleistocene and continued during the Holocene. There is evidence of glaciation on the volcanoes, including moraines.

The only historical activity of unspecified character occurred during 1865–1867; the volcano may still be a threat to Bolivia and Chile. It also features vigorous fumarolic activity and has been inspected for its geothermal energy potential.

== Geomorphology and geography ==
Olca-Paruma forms part of the Chile-Bolivia border. The Chilean sector lies partly in the commune of Ollagüe, El Loa province, Antofagasta Region, and partly in the Tamarugal Province, Tarapaca Region. The Bolivian segment lies in the Potosi Department. The Estación Yuma and the Estación Ruquíos lie at the southern foot of Olca-Paruma, along with an unpaved road. The buildings of Cercicha and Pajancha lie on the Bolivian side, at the southeastern foot.

Southwest of Olca-Paruma lie various mines, including, in order of increasing distance: Ujina, Rosario, and Quebrada Blanca. Habitations in the area include Amincha, Collahuasi, Cosca, and Ollagüe. Olca-Paruma is relatively remote from human habitation. During the 20th century, sulfur mining operations connected to Ollagüe took place at Olca.

=== Regional ===
Olca-Paruma belongs to the Central Volcanic Zone (CVZ) of the Andean Volcanic Belt, a 1,500 kilometres (930 mi) long volcanic arc that features 44 active, or potentially active, volcanoes. The most active volcano is Lascar, where a major eruption took place in 1993. Other volcanoes with recorded activity include Irruputuncu, Isluga, and San Pedro. Fumarolic activity has been recorded at Alitar, Guallatiri, Lastarria, Olca-Paruma, Ollagüe, Putana, and Tacora. The volcanic activity of the CVZ ultimately is caused by the Nazca Plate subducting beneath the South American Plate.

Map of the region

=== Local ===
Olca-Paruma is a 20-kilometre (12 mi) long volcanic complex. It is composed of the 5,762-metre (18,904 ft) high conical Cerro Paruma (20°56′S 68°26′W (Note: All heights and coordinates according to the Synonyms & Subfeatures table of the Global Volcanism Program; data on Olca is obtained from the main GVP listing)), the 5,728-metre (18,793 ft) high Volcan Paruma (20°57′S 68°26′W), 2 kilometres (1.2 mi) west of Cerro Paruma, the 5,705-metre (18,717 ft) high Olca (20.939°S 68.413°W), 7 kilometres (4.3 mi) west of Volcan Paruma, and the 5,305-metre (17,405 ft) high Mencheca (20°56′S 68°30′W) volcanoes, which are aligned in an east–west direction. Mencheca is also known as Michincha. Additional centres are the 5,167-metre (16,952 ft) high Cerro Olca Sur (20°58′S 68°29′W) and Cumbre Blanca. Directly west of Cerro Paruma lies Cerro Candelaria and north of it a saddle named Salle Orca, which leads north to another summit, Cerro Moro. Olca has a summit crater, and two craters are found on Volcan Paruma, plus at least twelve additional vents. Some vents have well-preserved craters and others are eroded. The volcanoes are accompanied by surge deposits formed during explosive activity. The basal diameter of the edifice is 17 kilometres (11 mi), the basal surface 227 square kilometres (88 sq mi), and the volume of the edifice is 74 cubic kilometres (18 cu mi).

Lava flows reaching lengths of 7 kilometres (4.3 mi) extend in a northerly direction from the summit crater of Olca. There appear to be older lava flows on the western side of Olca that reach lengths of 5 kilometres (3.1 mi) and that have been buried by younger flows. Other lava flows on the northern and western sides of the volcano were erupted from vents farther west of Olca. Some fresh lava flows extend in a southeasterly direction from Volcan Paruma, reaching 7 kilometres (4.3 mi) in length. They are long and 300 metres (980 ft) wide and do not branch. Another much shorter lava flow with flow ridges lies east of Volcan Paruma's summit.

The basement is formed by the Miocene-Pliocene age Ujina ignimbrite. The basement around Olca volcano lies at an elevation of about 4,200 metres (13,800 ft). The Salar de Laguani sits at the eastern foot of Olca-Paruma and the Salar de la Laguna at its northern foot.

=== Hydrology ===
The southern side of the complex shows some traces of past glaciation in the form of two different sets of apron-like moraines, one at an elevation of 4,750 metres (15,580 ft) and the other at 4,350 metres (14,270 ft); even lower moraines have been found and valley glaciers formed on Paruma. Some lower lava flows show evidence of heavy glaciation, which produced cirques and U-shaped valleys. The moraines appear to relate to a glaciation 15,000-11,000 years ago. At least one warm spring is located at the foot of Olca-Paruma. The eastern slopes drain into the Salar de Laguani, the northern slopes into the Salar de la Laguna, and the southwestern slopes into the Salar Michincha. On the southeastern side the Rio Pajancha originates on Olca-Paruma's slopes, while the southern slope drains into the Salar de Alconcha through the Quebrada Churchicha and Quebrada Juchuchurchicha.

=== Composition ===
Lava flows contain andesite and dacite of relatively uniform composition, the former containing amphibole. The morphology of the two long lava flows from Volcan Paruma implies that they were formed by lavas more mafic than is typical for the region, perhaps by andesite-andesite. The volcanic rocks also include basaltic andesite, trachyandesite and rhyolite; they define a potassium-rich calc-alkaline suite.

Fumarolic alteration is widespread on the volcanic complex, being conspicuous on the ridge between Olca and Volcan Paruma and on the northern and southeastern flanks. Sulfur is present on the volcano, mainly around Olca, and was mined into the 1980s. Sulfur mines on the Bolivian side include Mina Carlota between Olca and Paruma and Mina Tres Rayas on Olca. The sulfur was then loaded onto rails at Puquios station, on the Ferrocarril de Antofagasta a Bolivia rail line.

== Fumarolic activity ==
The lava dome in the main crater of Olca is fumarolically active, with the activity occurring over a 150-metre (490 ft) long elliptical fumarole field. Paruma volcano also shows fumarolic activity. Additional reports claim that vapours emanate from yellow pits on the western side. The fumarolic activity at Olca-Paruma forms clouds that are visible over large distances. Measurements have yielded sulfur dioxide concentrations of 35 ppm over the area.

Ground temperatures in the fumarole fields is about 357–364 K (84–91 °C; 183–196 °F). Satellite observation has shown temperature anomalies reaching 6 K (11 °F) , potentially caused by the fumarolic activity.

Fumarole gases in Olca appear to be influenced by hydrothermal components rather than magmatic ones, including high methane concentrations and overall high carbon/sulfur ratios. Conversely, water in the fumaroles appears to be roughly equally of magmatic and meteoric origin, and the carbon dioxide is almost entirely of non-mantle origin, and predominantly from limestone. Argon isotope data indicate a moderately radiogenic origin for the argon, and a substantial amount of helium seems to have been added by the crust.

Ultimately, the fumarolic gases of Olca appear to form in a hydrothermal system above magma, at high temperatures of 280–400 °C (536–752 °F) and with significant contributions from the magma itself, suggesting that there is still liquid magma beneath Olca-Paruma with a resulting risk of future volcanic activity.

Olca-Paruma has been investigated as a potential source of geothermal energy. Drilling to depths less than 700 metres (2,300 ft) has demonstrated the existence of warm groundwater beneath a clay layer, with temperatures of 70 °C (158 °F). A layer of high electrical conductivity has been found at depths of between 2 kilometres (1.2 mi) and 5–7 kilometres (3.1–4.3 mi) beneath Olca-Paruma. This conductive zone extends to Irruputuncu and appears to be part of a general high conductivity area associated with the volcanic arc.

== Eruption history ==
The Olca-Paruma complex has been active since 80,000 years before present and has produced numerous units of volcanic rocks. It formed in five separate stages, each giving rise to separate vents. Volcan Paruma generated lava flows during the Holocene, and lava flows of Volcan Paruma likewise display a fresh appearance, being clearly post-glacial. Other research has claimed that lava flows on the western side of Olca were erupted during the Pleistocene and that others seem to be much older. The appearance of the edifices suggest that volcanic activity migrated east over time, although validation of the proposed older dates would contradict this. Cerro Paruma is of pre-Holocene age. Potassium–argon dating has yielded ages of 430,000 ± 500,000 from distal lava flows west of Olca and 5,000 ± 350,000 from lava flows closer to the summit of Olca on its southwestern slope; both are considered unreliable. (Note: Wörner et al. 2000 also offers a date of 80,000 ± 40,000 years ago but renders it as both "80,000 ± 40,000 years ago" and "-80,000 ± 40,000 years ago"; negative ages are unphysical.) More recent volcanic activity was phreatic and phreatomagmatic and formed the summit craters.

The occurrence of recent volcanic activity and its location on the Olca-Paruma complex is unclear. An unconfirmed flank eruption occurred in 1865–1867 on Olca; it may have occurred on Volcan Paruma, however. Fumarolic activity takes place in an area of 0.1 square kilometres (0.039 sq mi) on Olca's summit and has been ongoing for over sixty years, and may have spiked in November 1989 – March 1990 when seismic and fumarolic activity occurred at the volcano. During that instance, strong fumarolic activity was observed on 13 November 1989 from Ujina, and seismic activity was reported in mid-March of the subsequent year. This fumarolic activity occurred in coincidence with earthquakes at Iquique on the coast.

=== Seismic activity ===
Three potential seismic swarms occurred in 2010: on 6 May, 2 July and 7 September. A cluster of seismic activity has been observed between Olca-Paruma and Irruputuncu.

An ANDIVOLC (Note: A NASA project that investigates earthquake activity in the Central Andes) seismometer array lies at Olca-Paruma, with over six seismometers in total around the volcano. Between 2010 and 2011, these seismometers observed earthquake activity ranging from a mean of 1.6 to a maximum of 10 earthquakes per day, most of which have, however, been linked to mining activity.

=== Hazards ===
As one of Bolivia's two historically active volcanoes (the other being Irruputuncu), Olca-Paruma is considered a possible volcanic threat. As of 2015, however, Bolivia does not have any active volcano monitoring on Olca-Paruma. The Chilean SERNAGEOMIN considers it a middle-to-low hazard volcano, the 46th most dangerous volcano of Chile and publishes a volcano hazard level for the volcano. A hazard map has also been published.
