= Nevados de Chillán =

Mountain in Chile

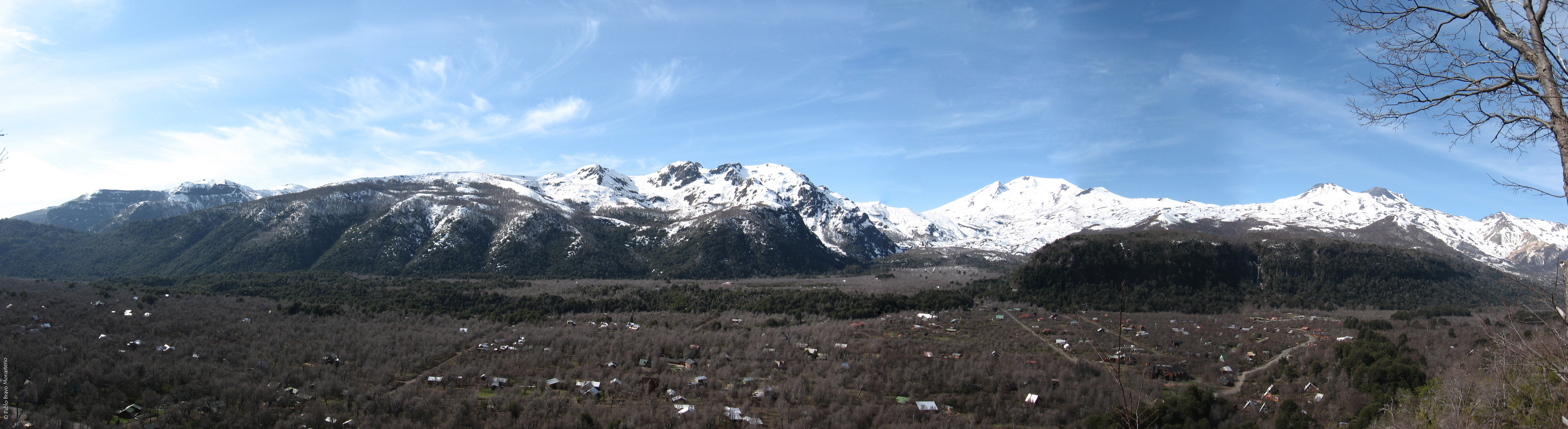
- Las Trancas Valley.

Highest point
- Elevation: 3,212 m (10,538 ft)
- Coordinates: 36°51′48″S 71°22′36″W

Geography
- Location within Chile
- Location: Chile
- Parent range: Andes

Geology
- Mountain type: Stratovolcanoes
- Volcanic zone: South Volcanic Zone
- Last eruption: 2021

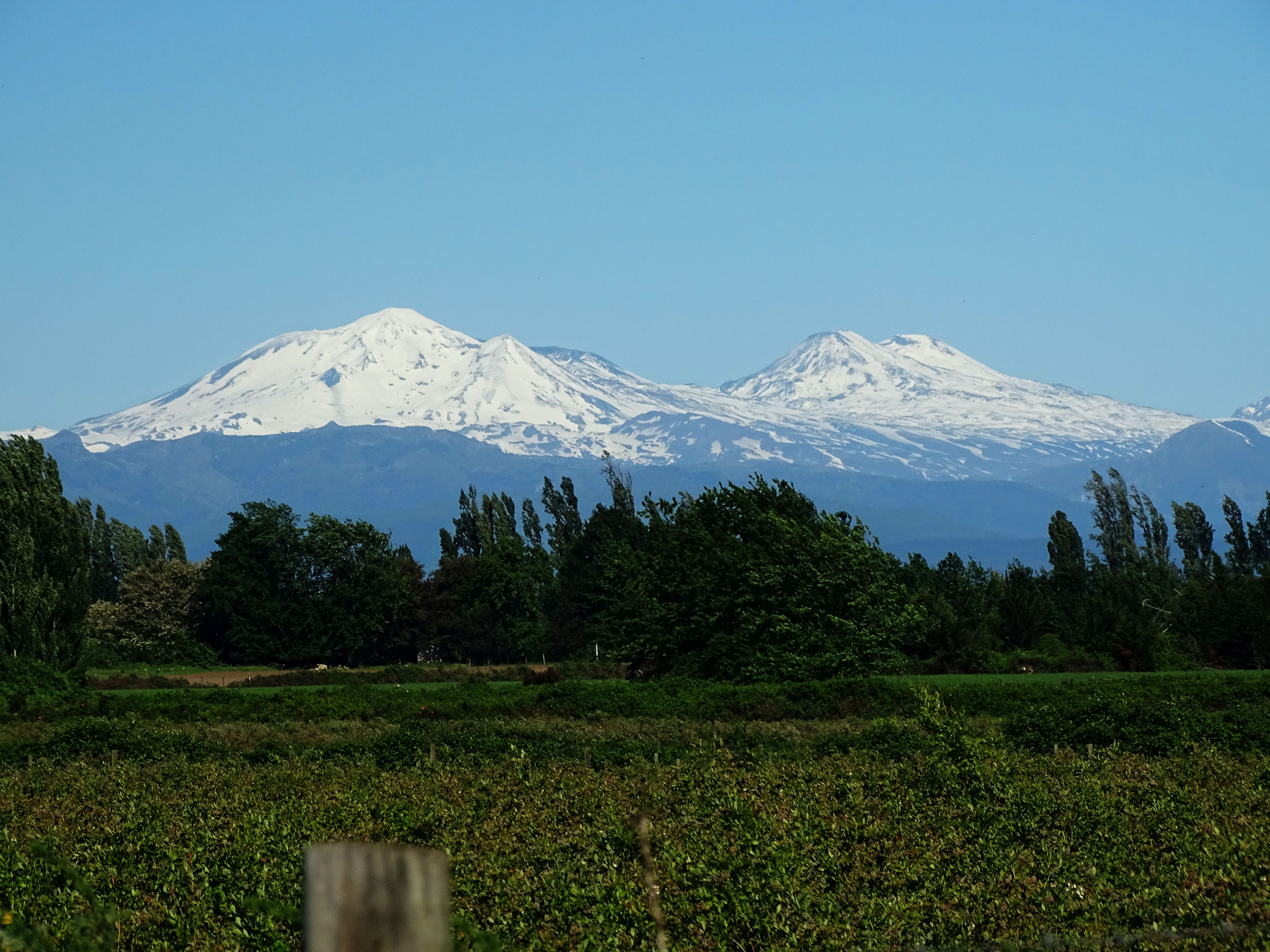
Nevados de Chillán volcanic complex seen from the west.

Nevados de Chillán is a group of stratovolcanoes located in the Andes of Ñuble Region, Central Chile, and is one of the most active volcanoes in the region. It consists of three overlapping peaks, 3,212 m (10,538 ft) Cerro Blanco (Volcán Nevado) in the northwest and 3,089 m (10,135 ft) Volcán Viejo (Volcán Chillán) in the southeast, with Volcán Nuevo in the middle. Volcán Viejo was the main active vent during the 17th-19th centuries, and the new Volcán Nuevo lava dome complex formed between 1906 and 1945, eventually growing to exceed Viejo in height by the mid-1980s.

This complex contains two subcomplexes: Cerro Blanco and Las Termas. The subcomplex Cerro Blanco includes the volcanoes Santa Gertrudis, Gato, Cerro Blanco, Colcura, Calfú Pichicalfú and Baños. The subcomplex Las Termas includes the volcanoes Shangri-La, Nuevo, Arrau, Viejo, Chillán y Pata de Perro. In addition, near the complex there are two pyroclastic satellite cones, the volcanoes Las Lagunillas and Parador.

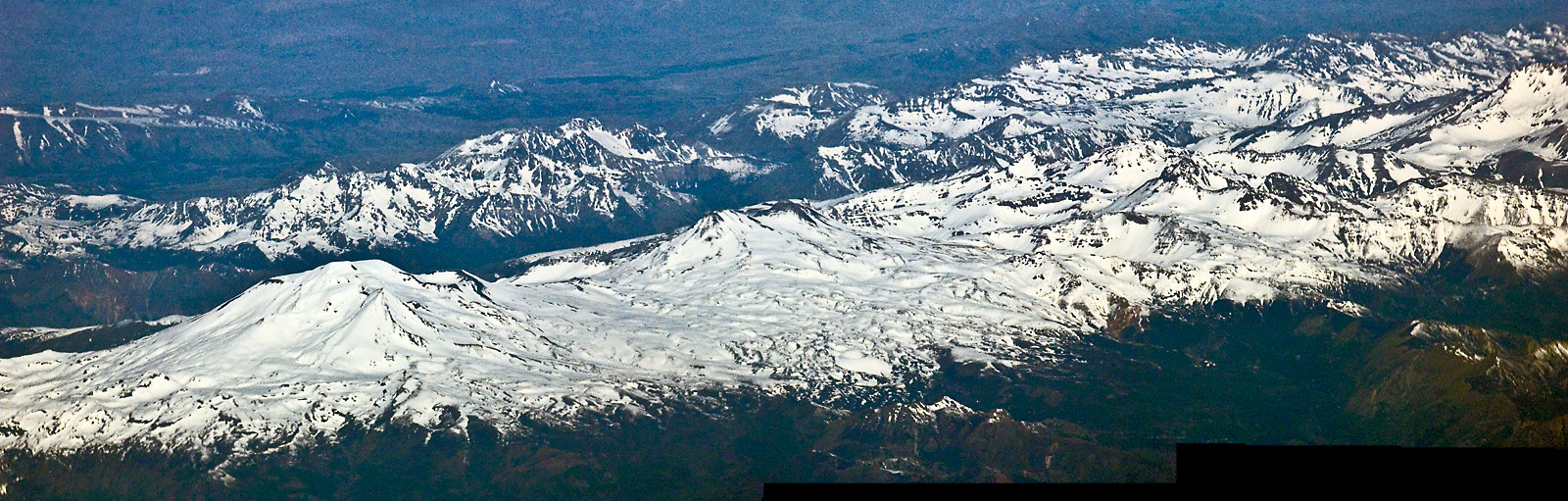
Aerial view of the Nevados de Chillán chain. Left to right: Volcán Nevado, Volcán Nuevo, Volcán Chillán. The Volcán Arrau dome complex (1973–1986) can be seen as a sharp cone-shape in front of the Volcán Nevado.

== See also ==
- Geothermal power in Chile
- List of volcanoes in Chile
