= Quinchilca (volcano) =

Volcano in Chile

Coordinates: 39.68°S 72.008°W

Quinchilca is a volcano in Chile. It is situated south of Villarrica volcano and consists of a caldera and lava domes. The volcano has a semicircular form constructed by layers of lavas and volcaniclastic rocks, with an eroded core. Volcanic rocks include basalt and basaltic andesite.

Potassium-argon dating has yielded an age of 800,000 ± 600,000 on its rocks, older dates such as 1.4 ± 0.6 million years have been reported as well.
