= Lonquimay (volcano) =

Mountain in Chile

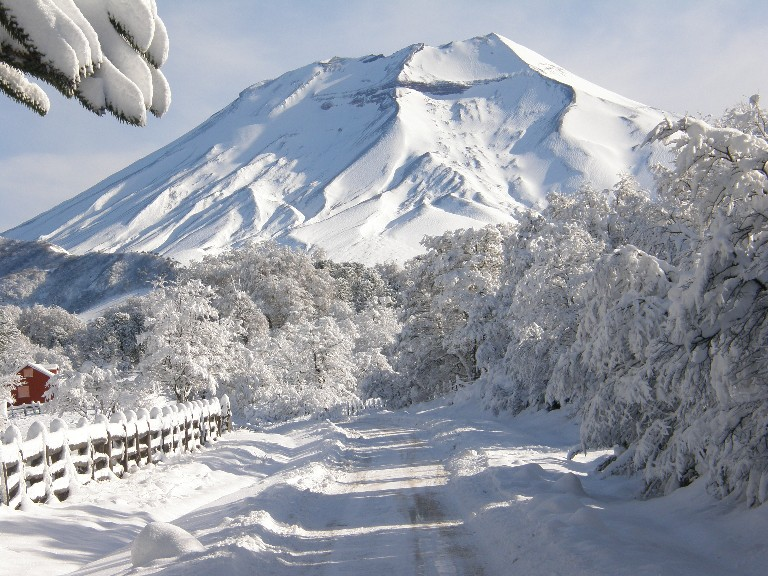
- Lonquimay in winter.

Highest point
- Elevation: 2,865 m (9,400 ft)
- Coordinates: 38°22′36″S 71°35′00″W

Geography
- Location within Chile
- Location: Chile
- Parent range: Andes

Geology
- Mountain type: Stratovolcano
- Last eruption: 1988 to 1990

Lonquimay Volcano is a stratovolcano of late-Pleistocene to dominantly Holocene age, with the shape of a truncated cone. The cone is largely andesitic, though basaltic and dacitic rocks are present. It is located in the La Araucanía Region of Chile, immediately SE of Tolhuaca volcano. Sierra Nevada and Llaima are their neighbors to the south. The snow-capped volcano lies within the protected area Malalcahuello-Nalcas.

The volcano's last eruption began on December 25, 1988, earning it the nickname "Navidad". The eruption lasted for 13 months before ending in early 1990. The Volcanic Explositivy Index was 3, indicating tropospheric injections and catastrophic damage. The eruption was from a flank vent and involved mostly andesite lava, and had been preceded by increased seismicity for three weeks. The volume of the lava flow decreased as time went on and the vent dimensions decreased, though by the end of the eruption the andesite had still built up to a length of 10.2 km.

There was only a single fatality for the duration of the eruption, but it caused the evacuation of over 2000 people and resulted in extensive damage to farming and livestock in the surrounding region.

Research that models the internal architecture of the volcano indicates that Lonquimay has reached its maximum height and that any large eruption of lava will likely occur from flank vents and not from the summit.

== See also ==
- List of volcanoes in Chile
- Volcanism of Chile
