= Lexone =

Now eroded volcano southeast of Tacora in Chile

Coordinates: 17.87°S 69.48°W

Lexone is a volcano, now eroded, southeast of Tacora in Chile. Some lava domes were dated by potassium-argon dating to be 60,000 to 70,000 years old and were formerly considered to be of Holocene age.
