= Dos Crateres =

Volcano in Chile

Coordinates: 25°36′S 68°36′W

Dos Createres is a volcano in Chile with two edifices. It is dated 7.9±0.5 Ma mya.
