= Pastillito =

Volcano in Chile

Pastillitos is a volcano in the Central Andes of Chile.

Stratovolcanoes and individual cones form the Pastillito volcanic group, which is formed mainly by andesite and dacite. Apart from the 4,883 metres (16,020 ft) high Pastillito, the 4,710 metres (15,450 ft) high Volcan de la Sal and the 5,073 metres (16,644 ft) high Dona Ines volcano are part of the chain. Other features are lava domes and sector collapse deposits.

Pastillito lies in a longitudinal valley that extends in north–south direction in the Andes. The Laguna San Francisco and the Salar de Maricunga are located in this valley. A sanctuary has been identified on its summit, a typical occurrence in regional volcanoes.

The Pastillito group is of middle Miocene age. One date obtained on Pastillito is 12.9 ± 0.5 million years ago. Additional ages range from 15.9 ± 0.7 to 16.2 ± 0.7 million years ago. It is part of an older, more westerly phase of volcanic activity in the region of Ojos del Salado; the present-day activity occurs farther east. At the same time as Pastillitos, the volcanoes Cadillal, Jotabeche Norte, La Laguna, Ojos de Maricunga, Santa Rosa and Villalobos were formed. The volcano has been degraded by erosion, which has exposed the Marte gold porphyry deposit in a large amphitheatre. This deposit was formed by hydrothermal alteration of the volcanic rocks of Pastillito.
