= El Rojo Sur =

Monogenetic volcano in the Andes

Coordinates: 20°50′S 68°37′W

El Rojo Sur is a monogenetic volcano in the Andes, in the form of a cone.

It is similar to El Rojo Norte 260 kilometres (160 mi) farther north. A mafic andesite lava flow was erupted from the 100 metres (330 ft) high cone that also features red scoria. Ages obtained by potassium-argon dating are 2.93±0.13, 3.4±0.4 and 3.23±0.12 mya.

Rojo Sur erupted undifferentiated mafic magmas. Its lead isotope composition is different from the composition of that segment of the Andes, being non-radiogenic. This isotope signature may be the effect of assimilation of deeper basement rocks during magma formation. In addition, the magmas are rich in incompatible elements.
