= Salar Grande (caldera) =

Caldera in Chile

Coordinates: 26°00′S 68°40′W

Salar Grande is a caldera in Chile.

The region originally contained various rocks with ages ranging from Neoproterozoic to Triassic. Starting with the Oligocene, the Central Volcanic Zone was active and gave rise to calderas, lava domes, pyroclastic cones and stratovolcanoes. The region lies at an elevation of 3,500 metres (11,500 ft) and largely unknown to people.

The Salar Grande caldera is located close to the border with Argentina, northeast of the Salar de Pedernales. The caldera has an elliptical form trending northwest-southeast, with dimensions of 50 by 25 kilometres (31 mi × 16 mi). As the caldera formed, some volcanoes collapsed into the depression. Ignimbrites from the eruption partly filled the caldera, whose scarp reaches an elevation of 500 metres (1,600 ft). The formation of the caldera was influenced by the neighbouring Pedernales-Arizaro fault.

The caldera is the source of the Salar Grande ignimbrite, as well as the San Andrés ignimbrite that overlies the former. The ignimbrites erupted by Salar Grande crop out mainly east of the caldera. They are yellow, white and gray and embedded within Miocene basaltic andesite, andesite and dacite lavas. Ages range from 12.07 ± 0.6 - 9.8 ± 0.8 million years ago.
