= Dos Puntas =

Volcano in Chile

Coordinates: 25°58′S 68°27′W

Dos Puntas is a volcano in Chile. A lava flow on the northern flank was dated 2 mya.
