= Juan de la Vega =

Maar in Chile

Coordinates: 25°52′S 68°48′W

Juan de la Vega is a maar in Chile. It is located in the north-central Andes.

Sulfur deposits are widespread in northern Chile and are associated with volcanoes, chiefly their craters and slopes. A number of these have been mined, especially in the northern segment of the area. These volcanoes form part of the Central Volcanic Zone, a north-south trending volcanic arc. Notable volcanic structures close to Juan de La Vega are the Aguilar caldera and the still active Lastarria volcano; Juan de la Vega is located inside the Aguilar caldera south of a resurgent dome.

Juan de la Vega is found close to the Salar de La Isla. It is a well preserved maar, has a diameter of 1 kilometre (0.62 mi) and a depth of 170 metres (560 ft). It is surrounded by a pyroclastic ring that contains xenoliths derived from the Paleozoic basement formations. This ring is 10–30 metres (33–98 ft) thick and progressively thins outward. It covers a surface area of 6 square kilometres (2.3 sq mi). One andesitic lava flow that was cut by the maar formation is 13.2 ± 0.7 million years ago. A diatreme is also associated with the maar.

The maar was originally created by phreatomagmatic activity linked to a local fault. After the eruption, hydrothermal activity took place in the maar crater and left deposits of sulfur both in the maar and the surrounding pyroclastics. The sulfur is found associated with solfataric vents and embedded in rocks. This is an unusual deposit of sulfur as these are usually found at stratovolcanoes in the region. This sulfur was prospected for mining.
