= Tinguiririca Volcano =

Mountain in Chile

Highest point
- Elevation: 4,280 m (14,040 ft)
- Coordinates: 34°48′49″S 70°21′07″W

Geography
- Location: Chile
- Parent range: Andes

Geology
- Mountain type: Stratovolcano
- Last eruption: 1917

Tinguiririca Volcano is a massive and active stratovolcano located in Chile's VI Region (O'Higgins) near the Argentinian border. Constant fumarolic activity occurs within and on the NW wall of its summit crater and hot springs and fumaroles can also be seen on the western flanks, as illustrated by the image on the right. It was near this volcano that the Uruguayan Air Force Flight 571 crashed in 1972, and those passengers who had survived the crash were lost for 72 days.

== See also ==
- List of volcanoes in Chile
- Tinguiririca River
