= Irruputuncu =

Volcano shared by Bolivia and Chile

- Iru Phutunqu, Iruputuncu, Irruputunco
- Location within Bolivia

Highest point
- Elevation: 5,163 m (16,939 ft)
- Coordinates: 20°43′55″S 68°33′08″W

Geography
- Location: Bolivia, Potosí Department, Nor Lípez Province; Chile, Tarapacá Region
- Parent range: Andes, Cordillera Occidental

Geology
- Rock age: Pleistocene-Holocene
- Mountain type: Stratovolcano
- Last eruption: 1995

Irruputuncu is a volcano in the commune of Pica, Tamarugal Province, Tarapacá Region, Chile, as well as San Pedro de Quemes Municipality, Nor Lípez Province, Potosí Department, Bolivia. The mountain's summit is 5,163 m (16,939 ft) high and has two summit craters—the southernmost 200 m (660 ft)-wide one has active fumaroles. The volcano also features lava flows, block and ash flows and several lava domes. The volcano is part of the Andean Central Volcanic Zone (CVZ).

The volcano has been active during the Pleistocene and Holocene, with major eruptions occurring 258.2 ± 48.8 ka ago, between 55.9 ka and 140 ka ago and 1570 ± 900 BP (380 ± 900 AD), which were accompanied by the formation of ignimbrites. Historical volcanic activity is less clear; an eruption in 1989 is considered unconfirmed. Plumes linked to phreatomagmatic eruptive activity were observed on 26 November 1995 and 1 September 2003. Seismic activity is also observed on Irruputuncu, and ongoing fumarolic activity releasing 21–50 t/d (0.24–0.57 long ton/ks) of sulfur dioxide has left sulfur deposits in the active crater.

The Central Volcanic Zone is thinly inhabited and most volcanoes are not under reconnaissance, but Irruputuncu is watched by the Chilean SERNAGEOMIN geologic service. The possibility of geothermal energy production from the volcano has been examined.

== Etymology and alternative names ==
The name Irruputuncu derives from Aymara iru spiny Peruvian feather grass and phutunqu a small vessel or a hole, pit, crater. Alternative names are Irruputunco and Iruputuncu.

== Geography and geology ==
=== Regional setting ===
The subduction of the Nazca Plate and the Antarctic Plate beneath the western side of South America has generated a belt of volcanic activity named the Andean Volcanic Belt. The belt is separated in a number of volcanic zones by segments lacking recent volcanic activity; in these segments, shallow subduction of the plates presumably displaces the asthenosphere away from these segments. The segments with active volcanism are the Northern Volcanic Zone (NVZ), the Central Volcanic Zone (CVZ), the Southern Volcanic Zone (SVZ) and the Austral Volcanic Zone (AVZ). The "Volcanoes of the World" catalogue counts about 575 eruptions in the entire volcanic belt.

Volcanic activity in the belt is usually linked to the dehydration of the subducting slabs, which causes water and other subducted components to be added to the overlying mantle. In the case of the CVZ, this addition generates magmas that are further modified by the thick crust in the area, forming andesites, dacites and rhyolites.

=== Local setting ===
Volcanism in the CVZ is linked to the subduction of the Nazca Plate beneath the South American Plate. This subduction within the past c. 27.5 mya has triggered a thickening of the crust and orogeny. Approximately 44 volcanic centres that are either active or potentially active are found in the CVZ. Some centres are fumarolically active; these include Alitar, Lastarria and Tacora. Irruputuncu and other volcanoes including Guallatiri, Isluga, Lascar and San Pedro have displayed phreatic or magmatic-phreatic activity. The arid climate of the area has led to good preservation of volcanic structures.

A small gap about 100 km (62 mi) wide, which is known as the "Pica gap" but includes the Pliocene-Pleistocene Alto Toroni volcano that features vigorous seismic activity, separates Irruputuncu from Isluga in the north. Irruputuncu is part of an elliptical alignment of volcanoes that extends to the east, which may be linked to a cup-shaped intrusion in the crust. Older Pliocene volcanoes around Irruputuncu are Laguna volcano to the northeast and Bofedal to the southeast. Irruputuncu lies at the end of a chain of volcanoes that trends northeastward away from it. It may be part of a larger volcano system in the area.

The volcanic complex sits on top of ignimbrite layers, the Miocene Ujina and Pleistocene Pastillos Ignimbrites. These ignimbrites are c.150 m (490 ft) and 20–90 m (66–295 ft) thick, the former is a welded ignimbrite that was erupted 9.3 ± 0.4 mya and the latter in two stages 0.79 ± 0.2 - 0.73 ± 0.16 mya and 0.32 ± 0.25 mya. In terms of composition, the Ujina is pink-grey crystals and pumice and the Pastillos a gray-white pumice forming the lower member and the upper member of the Pastillos contains cinerites with accessory claystones, siltstones and diatomites. Further volcanic rocks beneath Irruputuncu are hydrothermally altered dacites that may be part of an older now deeply eroded edifice.

Irruputuncu is in the commune of Pica, Tamarugal Province, Tarapacá Region, Chile, as well as San Pedro de Quemes Municipality, Nor Lípez Province, Potosí Department, Bolivia. It is a relatively small, 5,163 m (16,939 ft) high volcano, which covers a surface area of 23.861 km^{2} (9.213 sq mi) with a volume of 4 km^{3} (0.96 cu mi) and has two summit craters, of which the 200 m (660 ft)-wide southwestern one is fumarolically active. Crater II, the youngest crater, is surrounded by the Crater lava flows that form lava domes and seven short lava flows 0.54–0.94 km (0.34–0.58 mi) long, 68–107 m (223–351 ft) thick and with a total volume of 0.042 km^{3} (0.010 cu mi) emitted from it. They have weakly developed ogives and there is no evidence of glacial activity anywhere on the volcano. The current edifice is constructed within a collapsed amphitheater of an older edifice. Overall, the volcano has a pristine morphology. Block and ash flows and thick lava flows of high viscosity form the stratocone. A rhyolitic ignimbrite is found southwest of the volcano. The oldest lava flows on the northern and eastern side of the volcano were erupted from a northeastern crater named Crater I and are 35–113 m (115–371 ft) thick with erosional features and preserved ogives. They have a volume of around 0.097 km^{3} (0.023 cu mi).

The younger flows are known as Queñoas lava flows; they form six distinct flows on the western sides of the volcano. They have different appearances depending on the side; the northwestern flows form lateral lava levees and ogives and reach thicknesses of 117–180 metres (384–591 ft) while the other flows have lobate structures with thicknesses of 23–95 m (75–312 ft). These thicknesses may be the result of high-viscosity magma and/or low eruption rates. A major block and ash deposit with the volume of 0.023 km^{3} (0.0055 cu mi) covers a surface area of 11.333 km^{2} (4.376 sq mi); it was highly mobile considering the distances it reached from the volcano on all three sides of the younger crater. It contains large blocks and has long flow ridges. A second block and ash flow formed by the collapse of lava domes covers 0.801 km^{2} (0.309 sq mi). Its blocks are somewhat smaller and its ridges are poorly developed. Fissure eruptions have generated large lava flows from the flanks. The El Pozo ignimbrite covers a surface area of 0.02 km^{2} (0.0077 sq mi) northwest of the volcano with a thickness of 50 m (160 ft), an approximate volume of 0.001 km^{3} (0.00024 cu mi) and is probably linked to Irruputuncu, in which case it would be the volcano's oldest unit.

Irruputuncu underwent a flank collapse that subdivides the volcano into two edifices, the older Irruputuncu I and the younger Irruputuncu II, about 140 ± 40 ka ago. This flank collapse extends 6.3 km (3.9 mi) southwest from the older crater I and is about 10 m (33 ft) thick. It was formed by the collapse of the southwestern flank and forms three distinct units formed by hummock-forming lava blocks and flow ridges up to 1 km (0.62 mi) long. Each stage is associated with an individual crater named Crater I and Crater II. The flank collapse was probably produced by oversteepening of the volcano or by asymmetric growth. Subsequent activity of the volcano has completely filled the scarp. The lack of ground deformation during eruptive activity suggests the magma chamber of Irruputuncu may be more than 7–15 km (4.3–9.3 mi) deep, which may be linked to the thickness of the crust beneath the Central Andes, ranging 50–70 km (31–43 mi).

Irruputuncu displays vigorous fumarolic activity that occupies about half the summit crater and is visible within several 10 km (6.2 mi). The 200 m (660 ft) high fumaroles have temperatures of 83–240 °C (181–464 °F) and are composed mainly by sulfur dioxide, followed by minor amounts of hydrogen sulfide, hydrogen chloride, hydrogen fluoride, methane, nitrogen and oxygen. In addition, argon, carbon monoxide, helium, hydrogen and sulfur are found. The temperatures of the fumaroles are comparable with or exceed the boiling point at such altitudes. ASTER imagery indicates Irruputuncu's fumarole field has a small surface area with high temperatures. Total sulfur dioxide flux from the volcano is between 21–50 t/d (0.24–0.57 long ton/ks). The fumarolic activity has left sulfur deposits on the volcano. Sulfur deposits are found in the youngest crater in an area of about 0.011 km^{2} (0.0042 sq mi), and also form small sulfur flows with pahoehoe-type morphology. Deposits are generally yellow but close to the fumaroles they display different colours depending on their temperatures. Upon exposure to the air they can burn. Gravel and eolian deposits form sedimentary units around the volcano.

=== Composition ===
Irruputuncu's rocks consist of andesite- and dacite. The El Pozo ignimbrite is pumice-rich and has a composition between trachyandesite and trachydacite. The Irruputuncu I lava flows are composed of trachyandesitic with biotite and plagioclase, while the Queñoas are composed of andesite and trachyandesite. The block and ash flows and Crater lavas consist of solely trachyandesitic rocks. Overall, these rocks belong to the potassium-rich calc-alkaline series typical of CVZ volcanoes. The magmas are formed by plagioclase and clinopyroxene crystallization with some mixing. Irruputuncu's rocks show minor evidence of crustal contamination, similar to other CVZ volcanoes located within transition zones.

Water is the most important component in the volcano's fumarolic gases, comprising 96.05% to 97.95% by volume. Examinations of deuterium and oxygen-18 content of the water have determined that like the water of fumaroles in other Andean volcanic centres, Irruputuncu water is a mixture of weather-related water and water contained in andesite. The helium isotope ratios indicate the magmatic component dominates the gasses at Irruputuncu, Much of the carbon dioxide comes from subducted and crustal carbonates. The gases escape from oxidizing magma at 491–781 °C (916–1,438 °F) and pass through a weakly developed hydrothermal system with temperatures of c. 340 °C (644 °F). Argon isotope ratios appear to be partially radiogenic.

== Eruptive history ==
The oldest rocks at Irruputuncu are lavas that have been dated by potassium-argon dating to 10.8 ± 0.6 mya. The oldest component clearly belonging to the volcano is the El Pozo ignimbrite that was erupted 258.2 ± 48.8 ka, forming a multi-layered ignimbrite that was probably generated by the injection of new, hot magma into older, cooler magma. A lava dome on the upper flank on the western side of the volcano is 0.14 ± 0.04 mya old. The block and ash flow between 55.9 ka and 140 ka old, but has not been precisely dated. The Crater lavas are 55.9 ± 26.8 ka old. The block and ash flow on the southwestern flank was formed 1570 ± 900 years BP. Tephra layers found in the Salar Grande area of the Atacama Desert may originate at Irruputuncu.

Historical activity of Irruputuncu is unclear. An unconfirmed eruption was reported in Bolivia in December 1989 and fumarolic activity in the crater was reported on 25 March 1990. Another report indicates activity in December 1960. Eruption plumes on Irruputuncu, which reached an altitude of 1,000 m (3,300 ft) and dispersed to the east, probably triggered by phreatomagmatic activity, were seen on 26 November 1995. The plume's colour changed between black and white repeatedly. Another plume was observed on 1 September 2003; neither of these incidents were accompanied with noticeable ground deformation. Like some other volcanoes in the area, activity at Irruputuncu has not been preceded by ground inflation during historical times. Several theories, including aliasing of the imagery, have been proposed to explain the lack of ground inflation.

Ongoing seismic activity at a rate of about 5–6 earthquakes per 10 days recorded in two separate phases, November 2005-March 2006 and April 2010-February 2011 respectively and including one seismic swarm during the first measurement period, has been recorded at Irruputuncu. Some of this activity may be caused by mine blasts from nearby mining projects. Geothermal anomalies of about 9 K (16 °F) have been noted, including a hot spring a northwest of the volcano.

== Threats and geothermal prospecting ==
With the exception of Peruvian volcanoes such as Misti, most of the volcanoes of the CVZ are in remote areas and are not closely watched. Irruputuncu is a remote volcano; a road between Iquique and the Collahuasi mine and mining infrastructure west of the volcano are the major sites that could be affected by future activity.

The 1995 eruption drew attention to volcanic hazards in the Western Cordillera. In Chile, Irruputuncu is surveilled by SERNAGEOMIN, which produces regular status reports and which in 2020 classified it as a "type III" volcano, owing to its proximity to Collahuasi mine. There are also hazard maps available. Future eruptions could involve both the emission of lava domes and lava flows or explosive eruptions; the western and northwestern flanks would be the most affected.

Olca and Irruputuncu have been examined as a potential location for a geothermal energy project involving a company named Minera Doña Inés de Collahuasi. A geothermal prospect made at the base of Irruputuncu indicated the presence of water at temperatures of up to 220 °C (428 °F) in a deep reservoir; the volcano was thus classified as "highly favourable area".

== Climate and vegetation ==
Polylepis tarapacana trees on Irruputuncu have been used (through tree rings) to reconstruct atmospheric radiocarbon concentrations and regional climatic variability, including El Niño–Southern Oscillation variability.

== See also ==
- Geology of Bolivia
- Geology of Chile
- List of volcanoes in Bolivia
- List of volcanoes in Chile
