= Tatajachura =

Stratovolcano in Chile

- Location within Chile

Highest point
- Elevation: 5,240 m (17,190 ft)
- Coordinates: 19.5°S 69.12°W

Tatajachura is a stratovolcano in Chile, in the Isluga National Park.

During the Pliocene and Pleistocene it erupted lava flows of andesitic composition and has a crater that opens westwards. The volcano is also the source of the Quebrada de Chiapa valley, and of an Inca ruin on the summit; human sacrifices were performed at the mountain to obtain a reliable water supply.

The age of eruptive activity is unclear; while the appearance of the edifice suggests a lower Pliocene age, its position in the Precordillera and atop an older plain suggests it may be older than that. Potassium-argon dating has yielded one age, 6 ± 1.3 million years ago.
