= Sierra de Gorbea =

Lava field in the Chilean Andes

Coordinates: 25°44′S 68°45′W

Sierra de Gorbea is a large lava field in the Chilean Andes that has been dated 4.7±0.5 Ma and 5.2±0.5 Ma by potassium argon dating. The lavas are dacitic to basaltic andesite with rhyolitic inclusions and no vent is evident.
