= Laguna Verde (volcano) =

Volcano in Chile

Cerro Laguna Verde
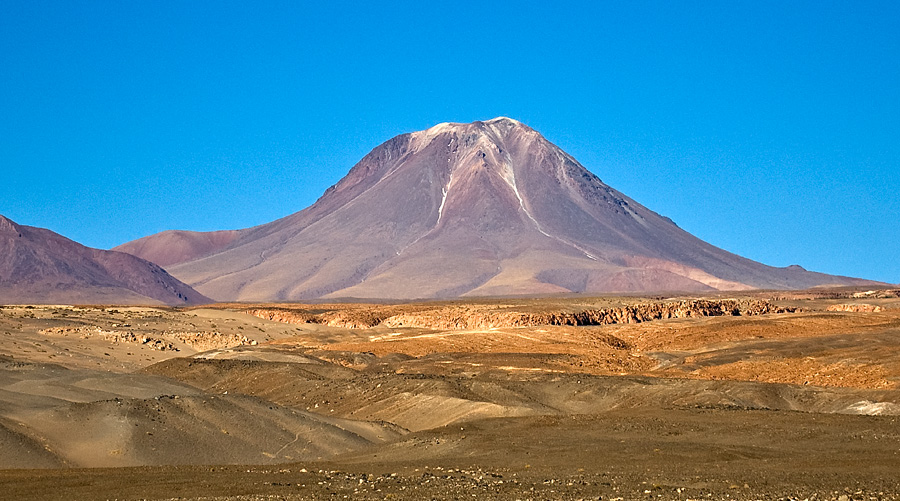
- The Cerro Laguna Verde volcano, seen from Laguna Chaxas.

Highest point
- Elevation: 5,464 m (17,927 ft)
- Coordinates: 23.252°S 67.71°W

Geography
- Location: Chile
- Parent range: Andes

Geology
- Mountain type: Stratovolcano
- Last eruption: Pleistocene

Cerro Laguna Verde is one of the many stratovolcanoes that integrate a 180 km (112 mi)-long chain east of the Gran Salar de Atacama in Chile's II Region. The mountain is located 6 km (4 mi) west of Acamarachi (also known as Cerro de Pili) and 12.5 km (8 mi) north of the Aguas Calientes (Simbad) and Lascar stratovolcanoes.

The age of the volcano, which rises 1,200 metres (3,900 ft) above the surrounding terrain is not known for certain. Earlier it was considered Pleistocene-Holocene. At some point in the past, the northern flank of the volcano collapsed. The resulting debris avalanche formed a lake in the Quebrada Portor from water dammed by the debris. The edifice has an estimated volume of 16 cubic kilometres (3.8 cu mi).

== See also ==
- List of volcanoes in Chile
- San Pedro de Atacama
- Purico Complex
