= Copahue =

Active volcano in Chile and Argentina

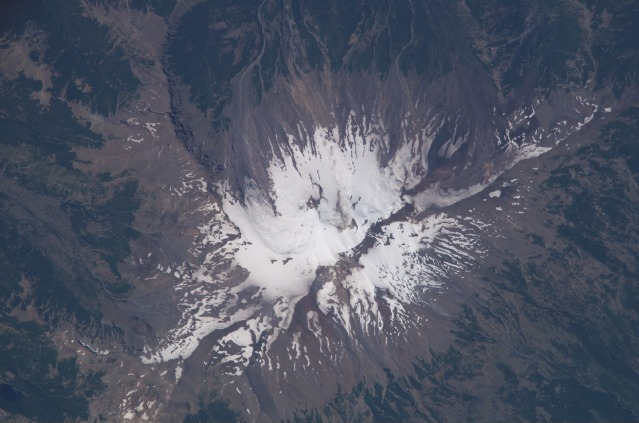
- Copahue Volcano photographed from space

Highest point
- Elevation: 2,997 m (9,833 ft)
- Coordinates: 37°51′S 71°10′W

Geography
- Location within Chile
- Location: Neuquén Province, Argentina Bío Bío Region, Chile
- Parent range: Andes

Geology
- Mountain type: Stratovolcano
- Last eruption: October 27, 2024

Copahue (Spanish pronunciation: [koˈpawe]) is a stratovolcano in the Andes on the border of Bío Bío Region, Chile and Neuquén Province, Argentina. There are nine volcanic craters along a 2 km (1.2 mi) line, the easternmost of which is historically the most active, and contains a 300 m (1000 ft) wide crater lake with a pH ranging between 0.18 and 0.30. Eruptions from this crater lake have ejected pyroclastic rocks and chilled liquid sulfur fragments. Although the lake emptied during the 2000 eruption, it later returned to its previous levels. Copahue means "sulphur waters" in Mapuche.

Copahue sits on a basement of sedimentary and volcanic rocks ranging in age from Eocene to Pliocene. The modern volcano sits in a volcanically active area, with a caldera from the Pliocene, measuring 20 km by 15 km, lying to the east of Copahue. The modern volcano became active roughly 1.2 million years ago (Ma). The modern caldera formed 0.6 to 0.4 Ma, and produced large pyroclastic flows, extending up to 37 km from the volcano.

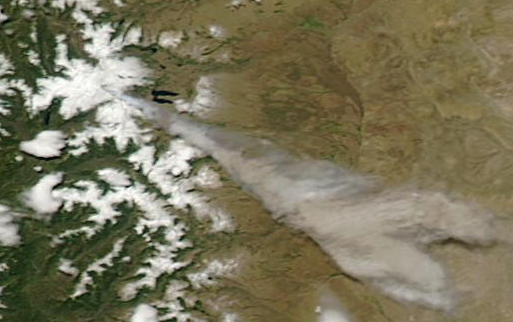
Satellite image of the December 2012 eruption

The modern structure is an elongated shield volcano, with a maximum thickness of 22 km and a minimum of 8 km. It has erupted ten times since 1900, most recently in March 2016. On 27 May 2013, it was reported that a red alert had been issued and the evacuation of around 2,000 people was to begin.

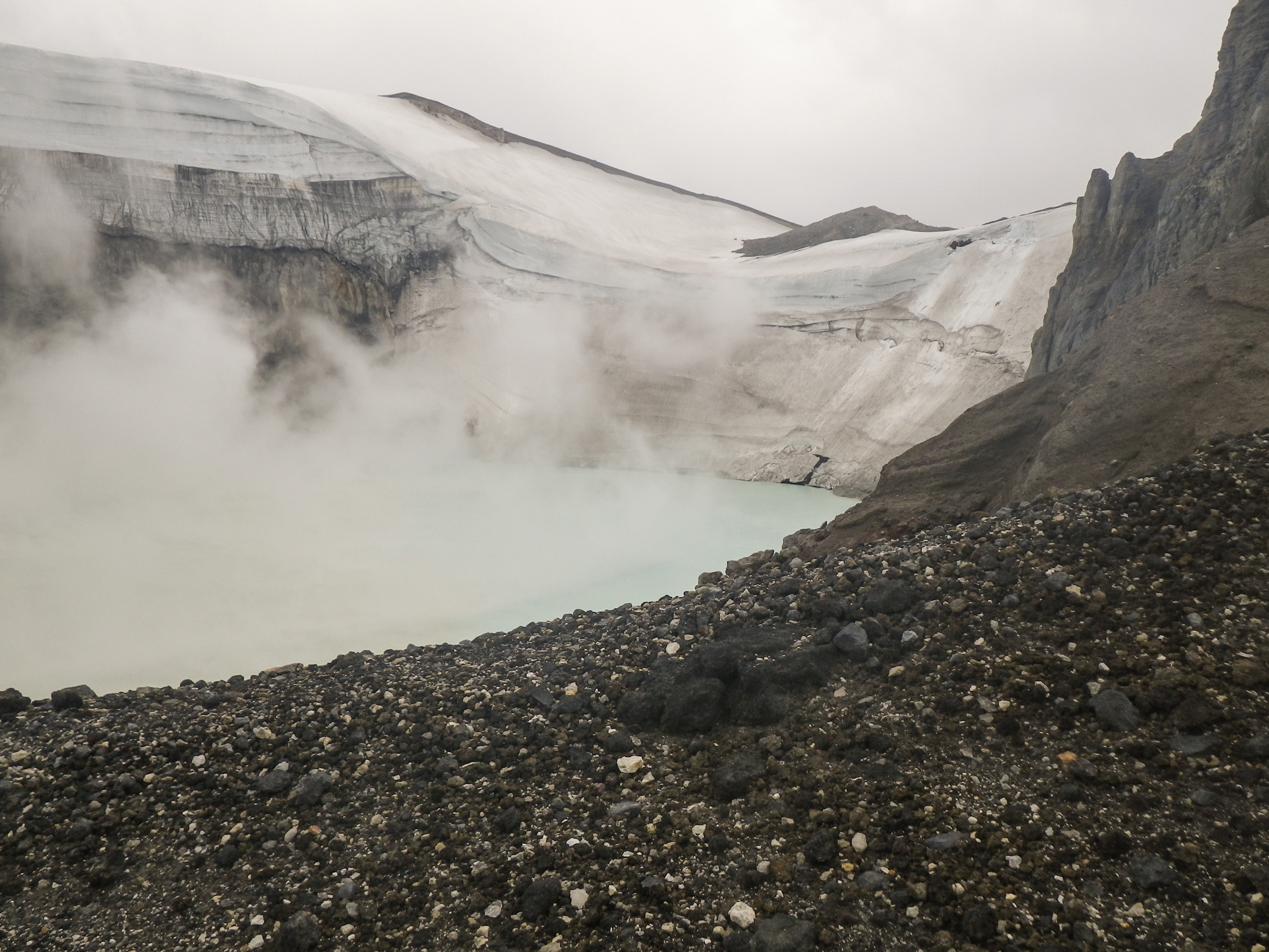
Copahue Crater Lake.

== See also ==
- List of volcanoes in Chile
- List of volcanoes in Argentina

== Bibliography ==
- González-Ferrán, Oscar (1995). Volcanes de Chile. Santiago, Chile: Instituto Geográfico Militar. ISBN 956-202-054-1. (in Spanish; also includes volcanoes of Argentina, Bolivia, and Peru)
- Biggar, John (2005). The Andes: A Guide for Climbers (3rd ed.). Andes Publishing (Scotland). ISBN 0-9536087-2-7.
