= El Rojo Norte =

Cinder cone in the Andes

Coordinates: 18°28′S 69°12′W

El Rojo Norte is a cinder cone in the Andes, constructed on top of volcano debris in the Lauca basin.

The cone is 150 metres (490 ft) high and 300 metres (980 ft) wide at its foot. Its profile has been reduced by erosion; the cone sits on an andesitic mound. A lava flow containing mafic andesite is associated with the cone. Phreatomagmatic deposits are also found.

The cone is formed by reddish scoria. Its rocks are basaltic andesite. It was erupted 3.1 ± 0.2 million years ago on the basis of potassium-argon dating. Other dates are 3.05 ± 0.22, 3.35 ± 0.16 and 2.34 ± 0.16 mya. Which age is correct is unclear, but the cone is partly buried by the 2.72 mya old Lauca-Pérez ignimbrite indicating that it's older than this ignimbrite.
