= Tolhuaca (volcano) =

Mountain in Chile

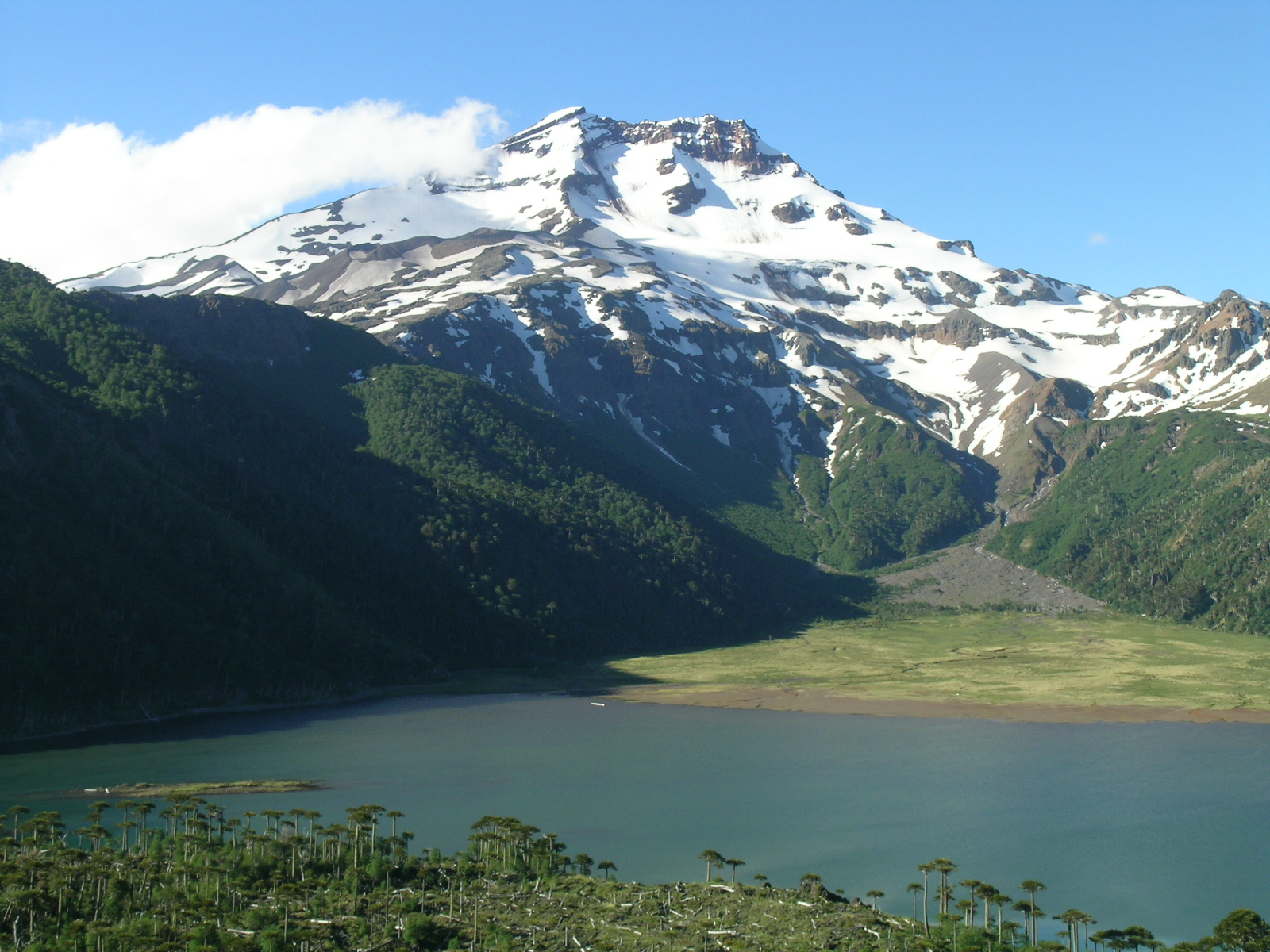
- Tolhuaca and Laguna Blanca

Highest point
- Elevation: 2,806 m (9,206 ft)
- Coordinates: 38°18′36″S 71°38′42″W

Geography
- Location: Chile
- Parent range: Andes

Geology
- Mountain type: Stratovolcano
- Last eruption: Unknown

Tolhuaca Volcano is a stratovolcano straddling the border between the regions of Bío Bío and Araucanía in southern Chile. The volcano has been shaped by glacial erosion, which contrasts with the relatively smooth slopes of its neighbor Lonquimay, due to the younger age of this latter volcano.

The volcano dominates the landscape vistas of Tolhuaca National Park, but is not actually located within its borders. The volcano's slopes are covered in forests. These forests are predominantly araucaria trees among others. There are also numerous small lakes known as lagunas among the scenery.

== See also ==
- List of volcanoes in Chile
- Malalcahuello-Nalcas
- Callaqui
- Sierra Nevada
- Llaima
