= National Geology and Mining Service =

Chilean government agency

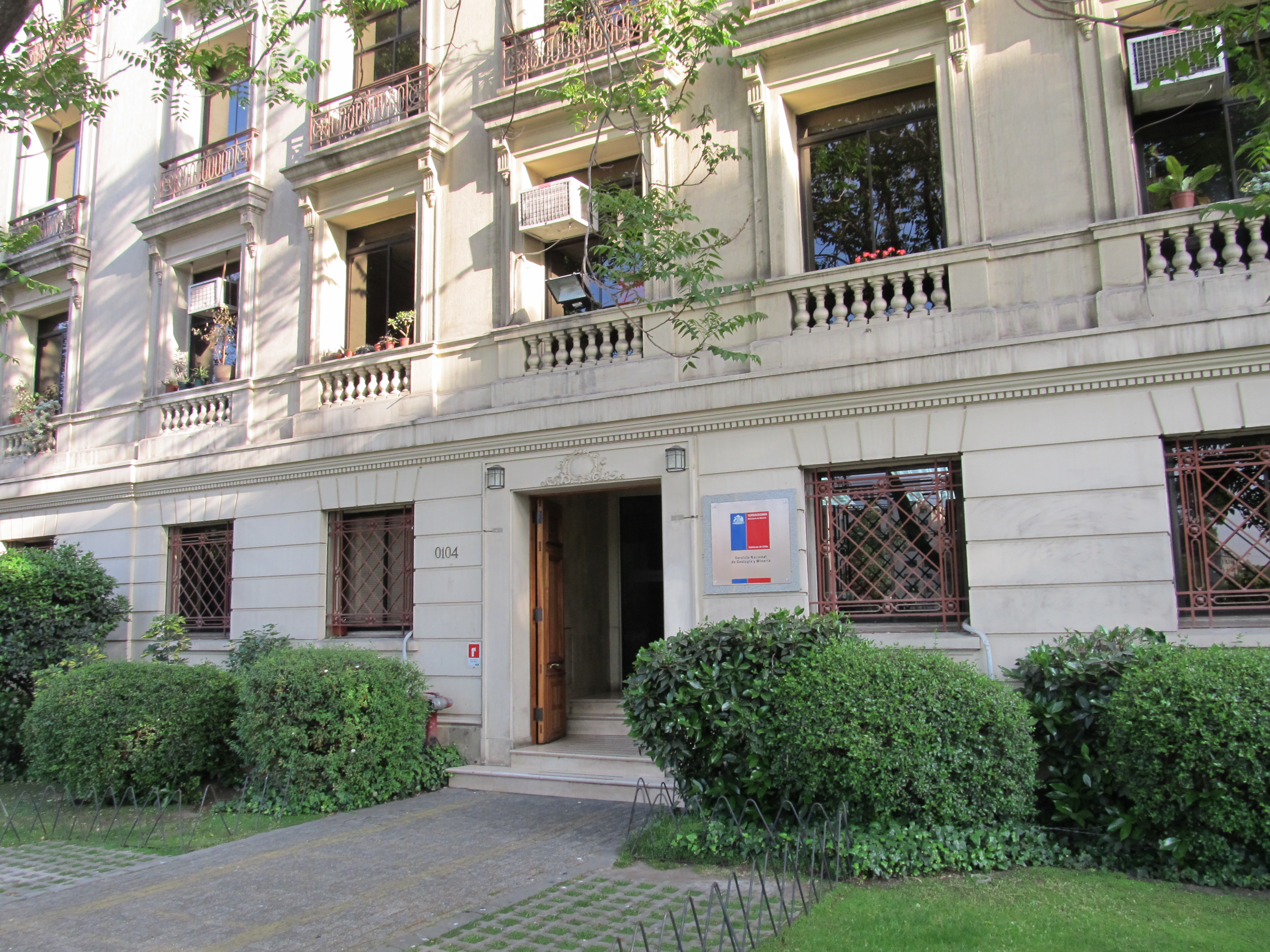
Sernageomin building in Providencia, Santiago.

The National Geology and Mining Service (Spanish: Servicio Nacional de Geología y Minería; SERNAGEOMIN) is a Chilean government agency. Its function is to provide geological information and advice, technical assistance to government, public and private interests, and to regulate the mining industry in Chile.

The service was formed in 1980 by the combination of the previous Institute of Geological Investigations and the State Mines Service. Its director is appointed by the President of Chile.

Since 1974, SERNAGEOMIN has published the scientific journal Andean Geology, formerly the Revista Geológica de Chile.
