= Salar de Talar =

Coordinates: 23°59′S 67°41′W

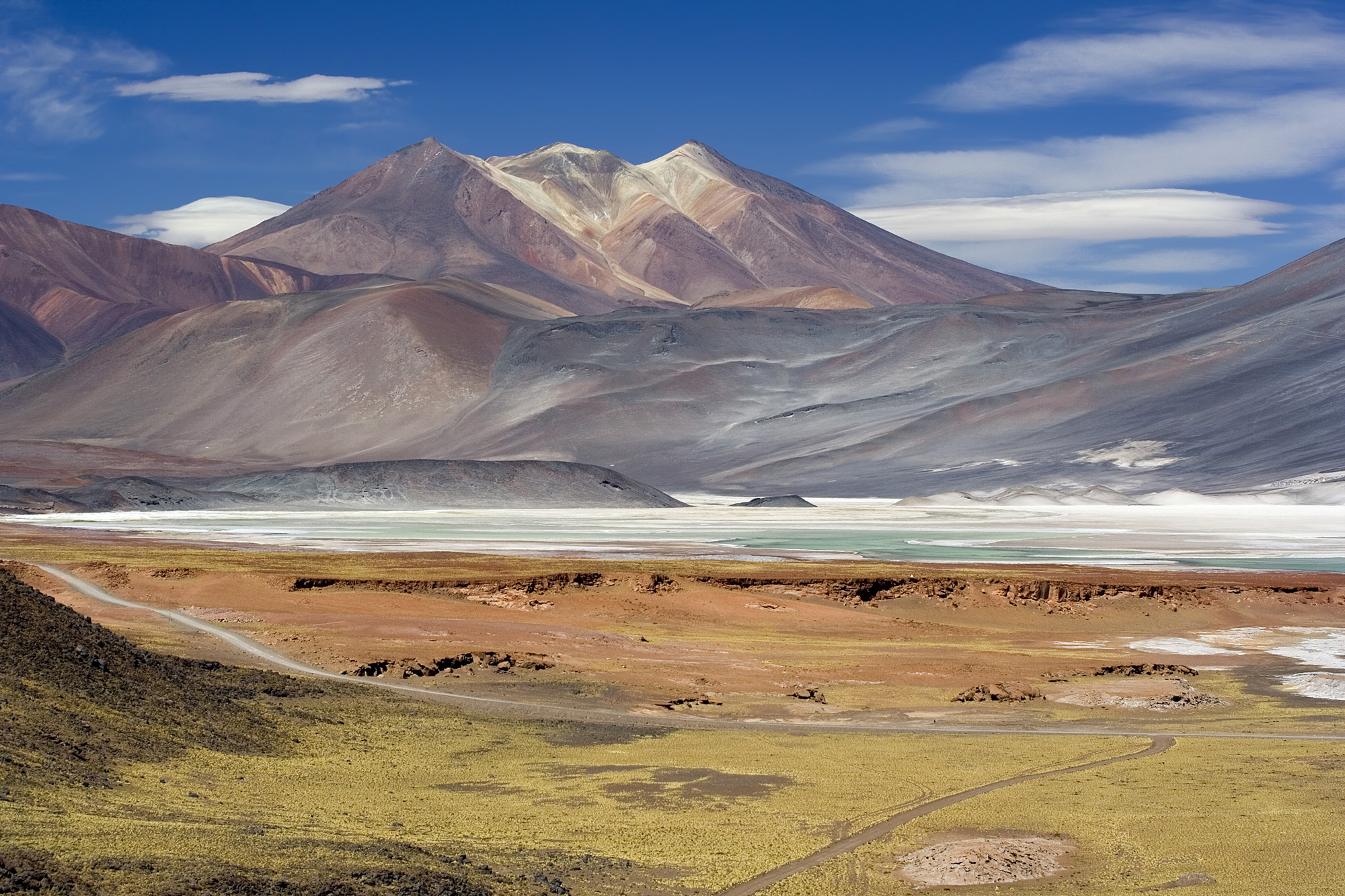
Salar de Talar salt flat with Cerros de Incahuasi in the distance

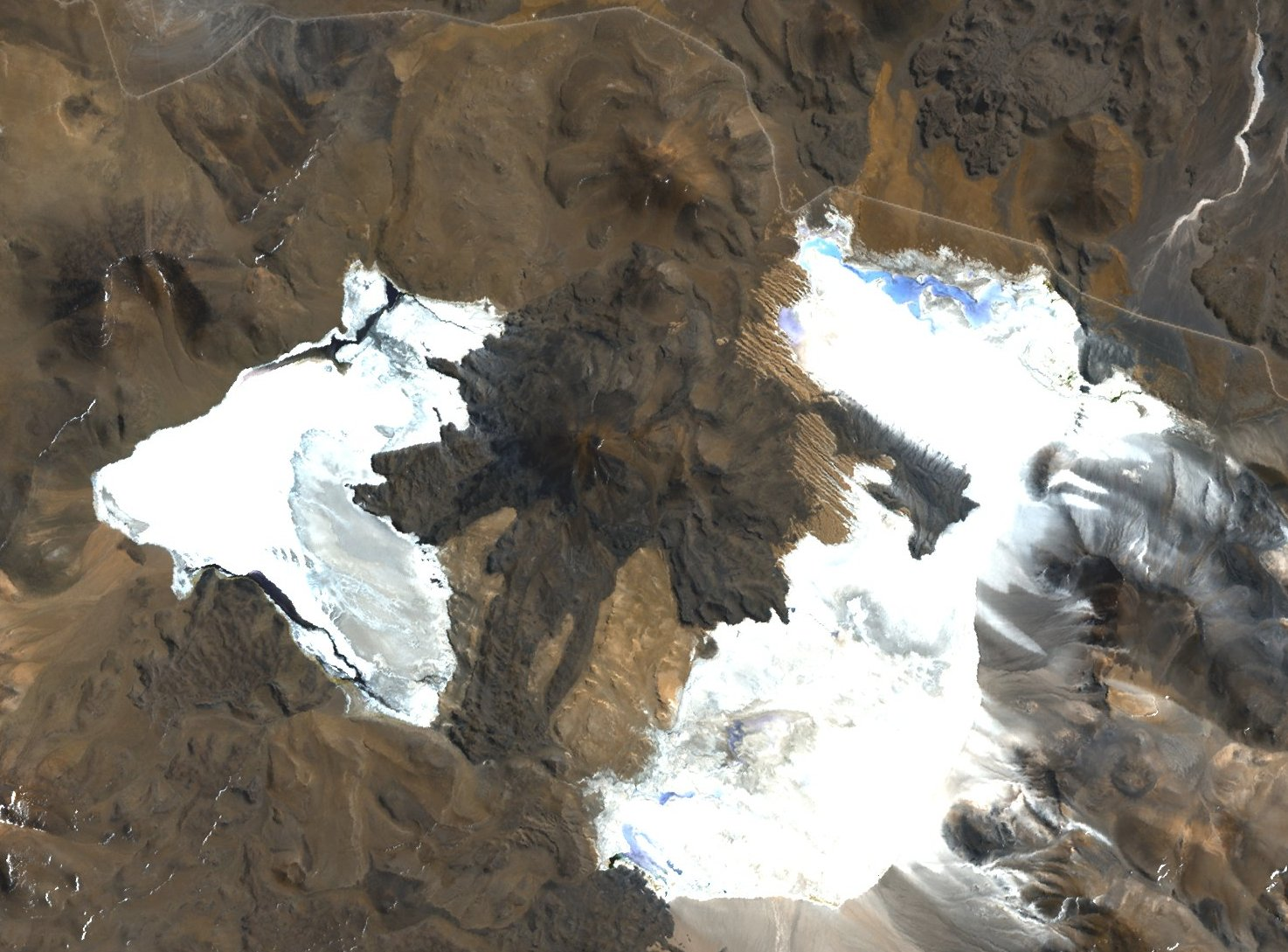
Salar de Talar is visible in the right half of this satellite image

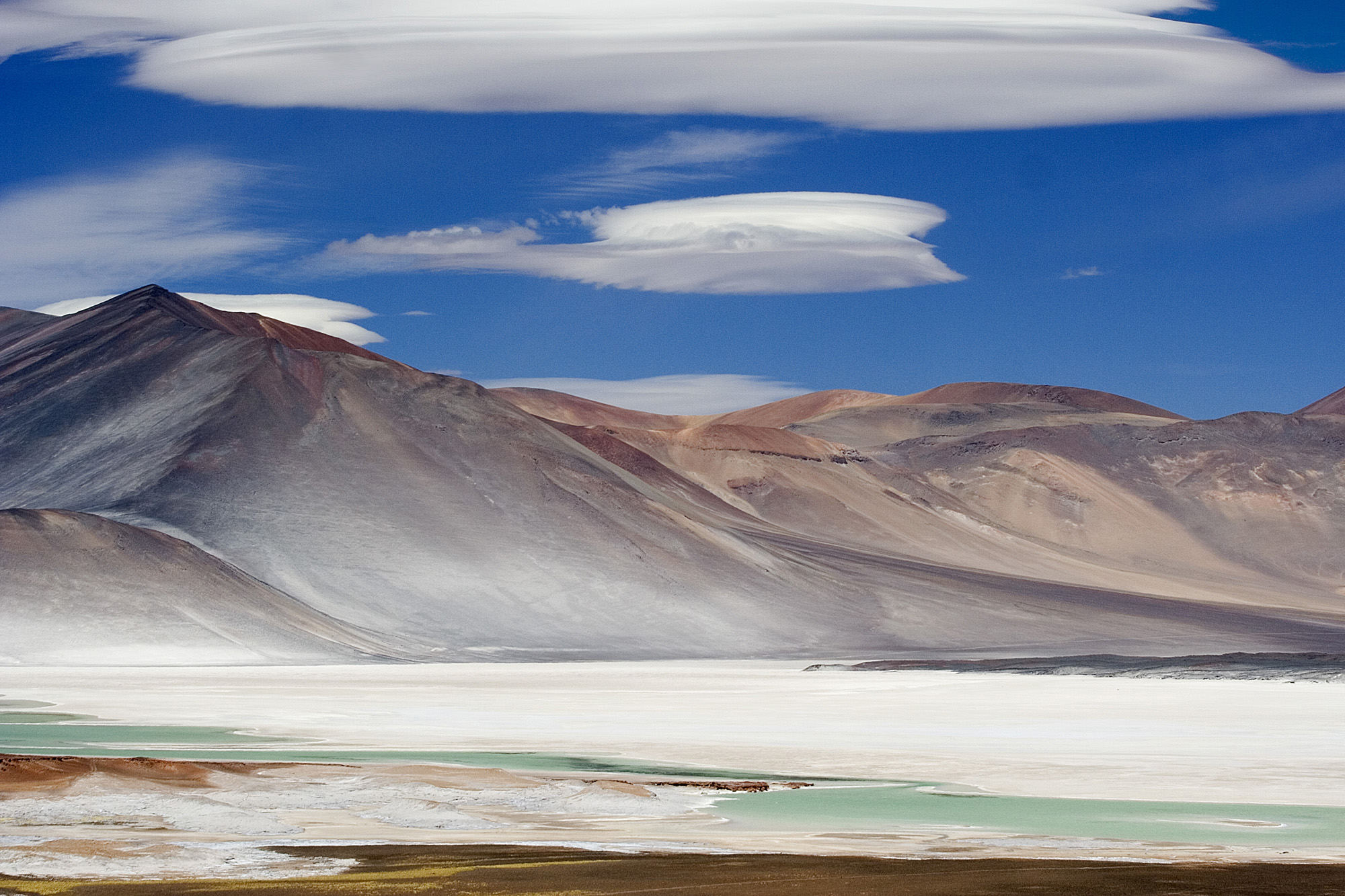
Cerro Medano

Salar de Talar (Note: This salt flat can appear on maps as Salar de Aguas Calientes (northern portion) and Salar de Talar (southern portion).) is a 46 square kilometres salt flat located in the high puna of northern Chilean Andes, at an altitude of 3,950 m. It is part of a series of salt lakes and salt flats located at the foothills of a chain of volcanoes stretching along the eastern side of the much greater Salar de Atacama.

The closed drainage basin of Salar de Talar encompasses about 476 km^{2} and is adjacent to other endorheic basins, including Laguna Miscanti, Laguna Tuyajto and Salar de Capur basins. It was once filled by a 31 square kilometres (12 sq mi) large lake connected to Salar Purisunchi.

The salty flat is bordered on the west by Caichinque and on the east by Cerro Medano. This latter is a mountain with striking shades of grey and brown, which contrast nicely with the sparkling white of the salt flat's surface. On top of that, colorful ponds fringe its shores. An important lava flow from the Caichinque volcanic complex formed two lobes which advanced into Salar de Talar. Salt deposits in the salt flat have polygonal shapes.

The climate of the area is arid, with an average annual precipitation of about 150 mm. Salar de Talar is a part of the Central Andean dry puna ecoregion, which in this zone is characterized by tussock grass vegetation.

== See also ==
- Salar de Aguas Calientes (disambiguation)
- Miñiques
- Cordón de Puntas Negras
