= Cerros de Incahuasi =

Mountain in Chile

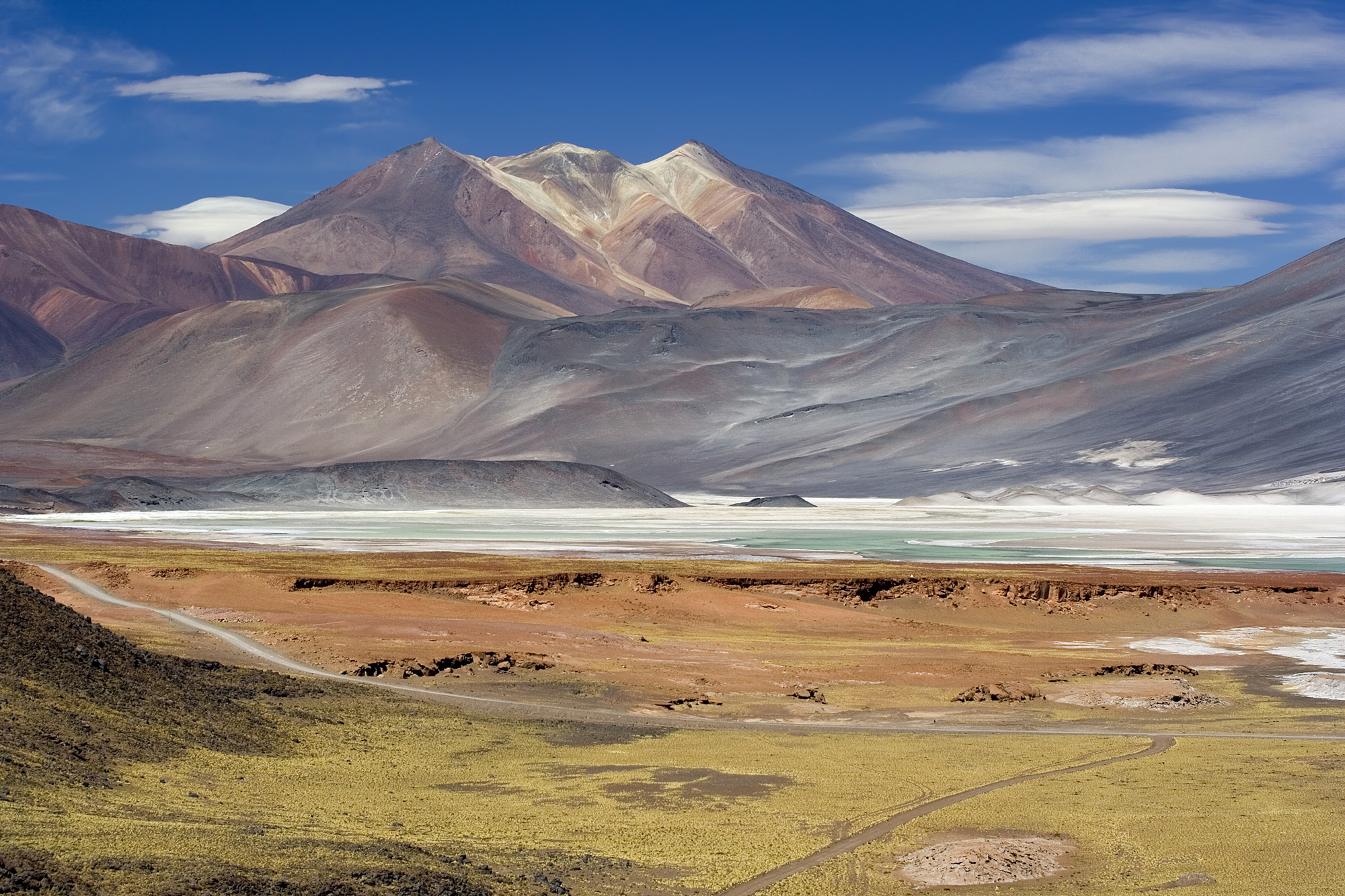
- Salar de Talar with Cerros de Incahuasi in the background

Highest point
- Elevation: 5,704 m (18,714 ft)
- Coordinates: 24°02′S 67°33′W

Geography
- Location: Chile
- Country: Chile
- Parent range: Andes

Geology
- Mountain type: Stratovolcano

Cerros de Incahuasi is a mountain with several summits located in the Antofagasta Region of Chile, near Sico Pass. The present–day mountain is the result of the partial collapse of an ancient volcanic edifice.

The Incahuasi Sur volcano in this range was active 10.5 million years ago. It is associated with a volcanic belt and fault that extends southeastward from Incahuasi Sur, the Calama–Olacapato–El Toro fault.

== See also ==
- Caichinque
- Cerro Miscanti
- Miñiques
