= Caichinque =

Mountain in Chile

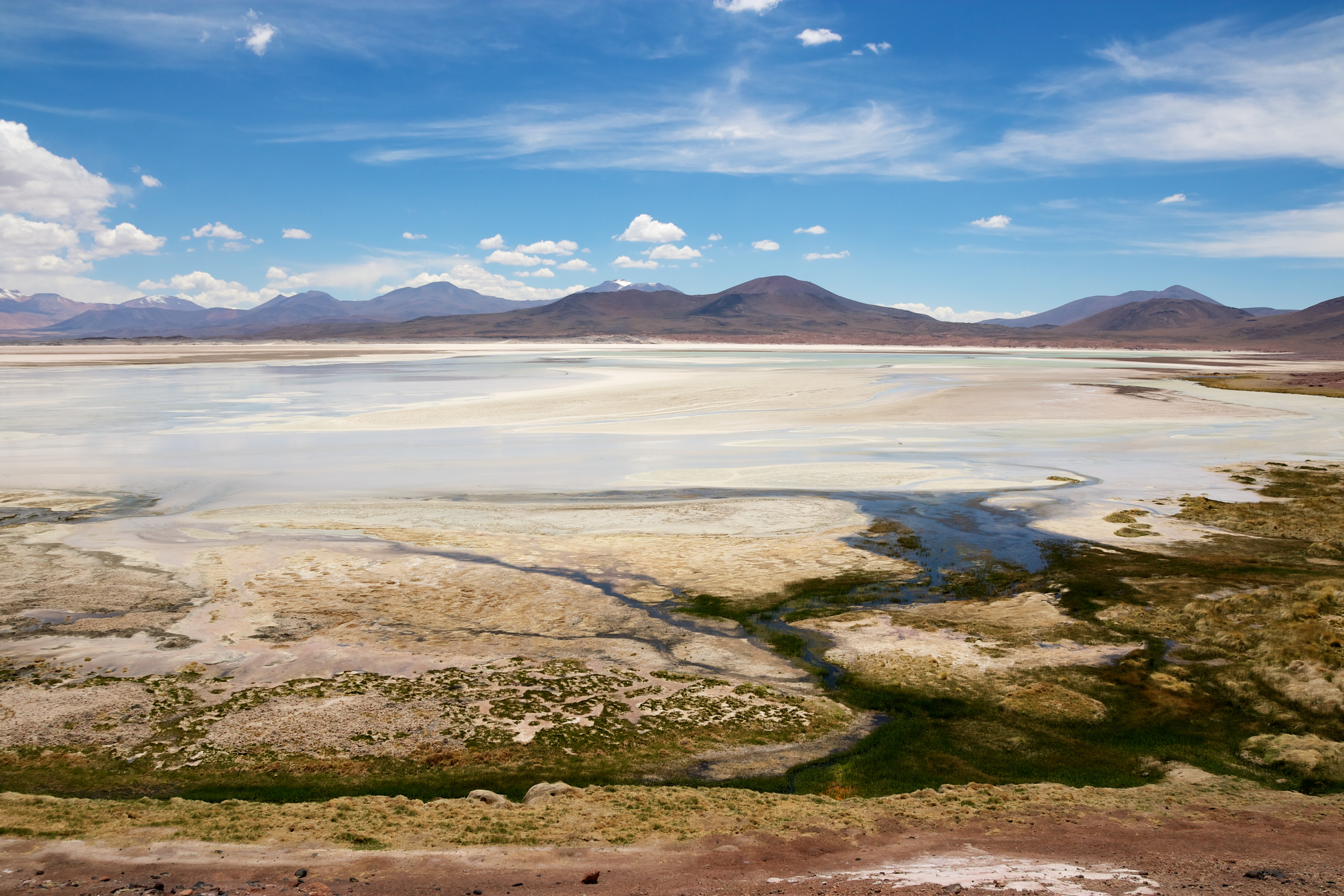
- The volcanic complex is in the mid-distance. The snow-patched mountain looming over Caichinque is Pular.

Highest point
- Elevation: 4,450 m (14,600 ft)
- Coordinates: 23°57′0″S 67°44′0″W

Geography
- Location: Chile
- Parent range: Andes

Geology
- Mountain type: Stratovolcanoes

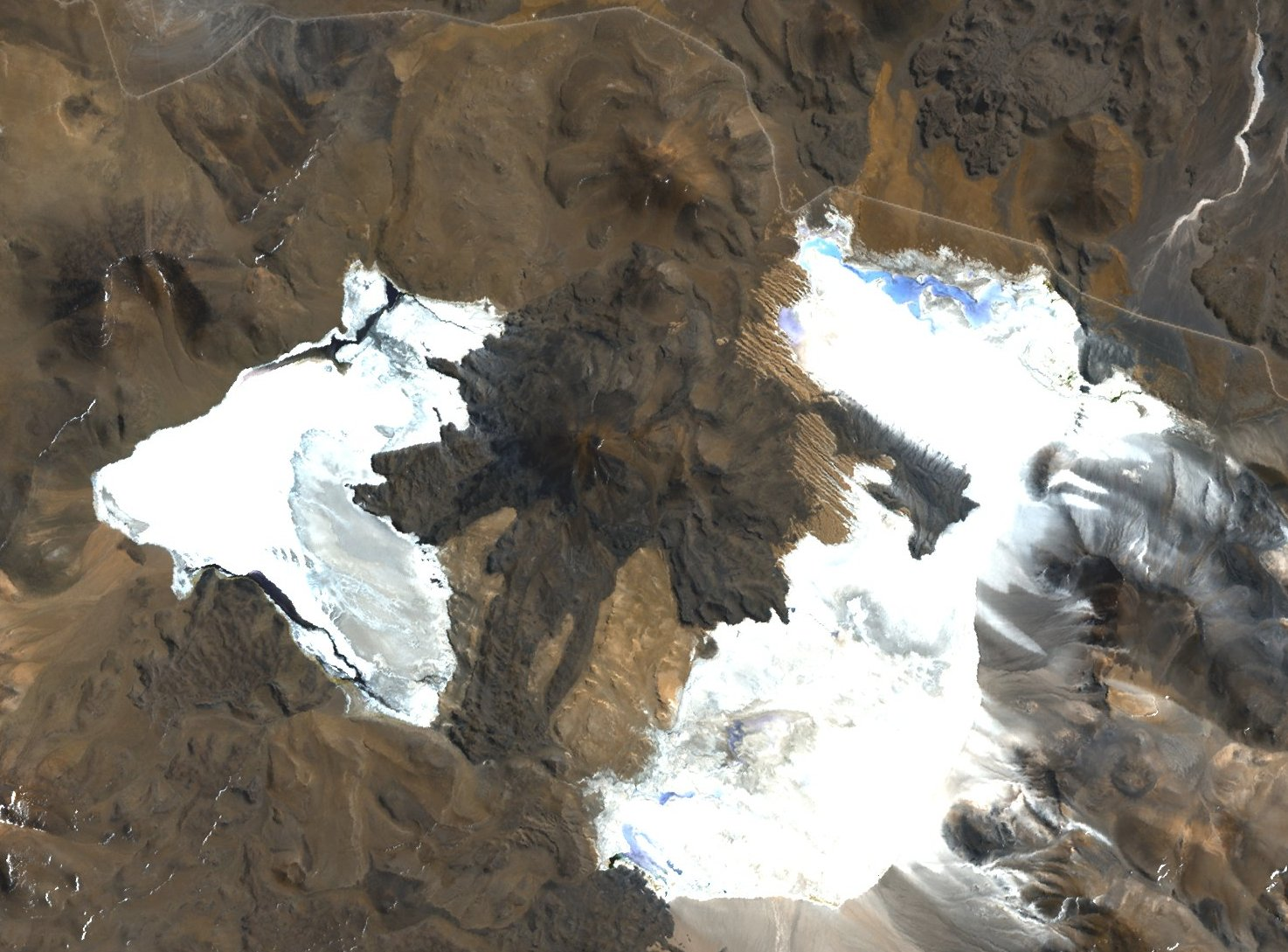
The complex is visible at the centre of the image. Salar de Capur (left) and Salar de Talar (right).

Caichinque is a volcanic complex lying between Salar de Talar and Salar de Capur, in the high Andean plateau of the Antofagasta Region, in Chile. It is located southwest of the Salar de Atacama, directly S of Cerro Miñiques and SE of Cordón Puntas Negras forming part of the main branch of the Andean volcanic chain in this area. Route CH-23 is an approach road to the volcano area and could be impacted by eruptions.

The volcano has erupted rocks with composition ranging from basalt to dacite. It grew atop a rhyodacitic ignimbrite.

== See also ==
- List of volcanoes in Chile
- Cerro Miscanti
- Cerros de Incahuasi
