= Tuyajto Lake =

Lake in Antofagasta Region, Chile

- Laguna Tuyajto
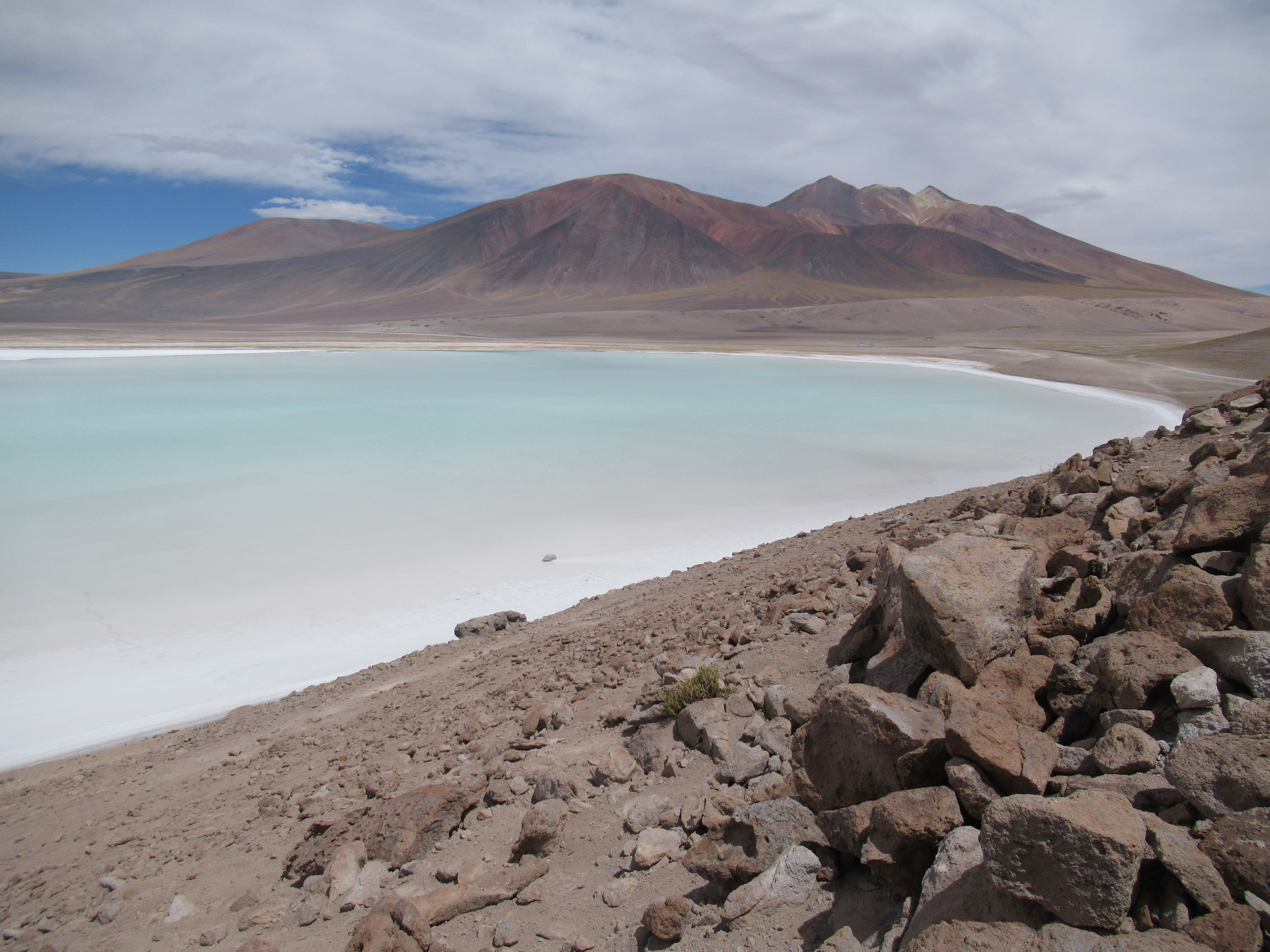

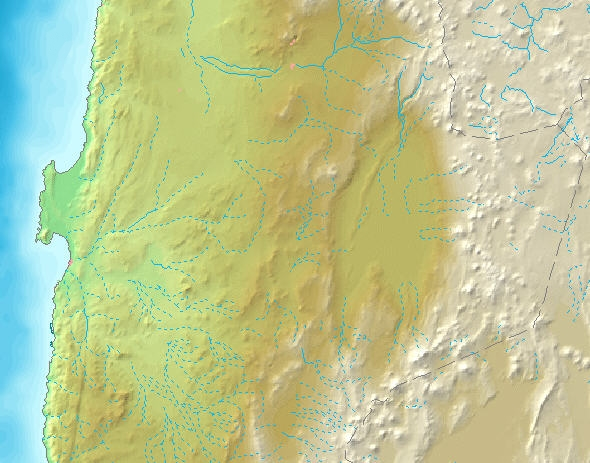
- Location within Región de Antofagasta Location within Chile
- Location: Antofagasta Region
- Coordinates: 23°56′22″S 67°35′23″W
- Type: salt lake
- Basin countries: Chile
- Surface area: 2.2 square kilometres (0.85 sq mi)
- Max. depth: 0.6 metres (2.0 ft)
- Surface elevation: 4,010 m (13,160 ft)

Tuyajto Lake is a salt lake located in the Antofagasta Region, northern Chile. Located at an elevation of about 4,010 metres (13,160 ft), its surface area presently fluctuates between 1.7–2.7 square kilometres (0.66–1.04 sq mi) but in the past it was considerably larger; this led to humans going to the lake and creating archeological sites there. Presently, the lake is groundwater-fed and has no surface outlet but water might seep out underground. It is part of the Los Flamencos Natural Reserve.

== Geography ==
The lake lies at an elevation of 4,010 metres (13,160 ft) in the Antofagasta Region, northern Chile. It has a maximum depth of 0.6 metres (2.0 ft) while its surface area is about 2.2 square kilometres (0.85 sq mi); due to seasonal evaporation and the gentle slopes of the lake floor it varies seasonally from 1.7 square kilometres (0.66 sq mi) in summer to 2.7 square kilometres (1.0 sq mi) in winter when the lake is sometimes partially frozen over. Lake levels also vary with the discharge of springs that feed it. At times Tuyajto Lake is almost empty, and salts such as gypsum and halite can be seen on the edges. Wetlands occur on the eastern shores, and the local flora and fauna depend on the water supply to the lake. The Cordón de Puntas Negras separates Tuyajto Lake from Lejía Lake.

Six former shorelines occur at Tuyajto Lake, like other lakes in the region at about 3–5 metres (9.8–16.4 ft) above the current lake levels; they are considered to be remnants of late glacial shorelines, during the Lake Tauca wet period. At that time between 13,800 – 9,100 calibrated radiocarbon years ago or 12,800 – 10,300 years ago Tuyajto Lake was much larger, having an area of 14.6 square kilometres (5.6 sq mi)-18 square kilometres (7 mi^{2}) and its uppermost shoreline reached 4,080 metres (13,390 ft) elevation. The former lake levels may have reached 20–40 metres (66–131 ft) above the present-day level perhaps to the point of overflowing, and still was about 40 metres (130 ft) deep about 8,000 years ago. During the previous highstand and as lake levels dropped, a minor river delta grew on the eastern side of the lake, with additional deltas forming as lake levels decreased.

== Hydrology ==
The watershed of the lake covers an area of about 245 square kilometres (95 sq mi). Springs, four of which are permanent, are the main source of its water which flows for some distance before reaching the lake surface; diffuse seepage of water within the wetlands and the lake itself makes up the rest of the water supply. Part of the water comes from Tuyajto volcano as well as Pampa Las Tecas and Pampa Colorada east and northeast from Tuyajto Lake and flows underground towards Tuyajto. In general, groundwater in the region is salty to brackish, it originates as rain or snow and probably obtains salts from underground salt bodies. The lake does not overflow at its surface, evaporation and perhaps underground drainage towards Salar Aguas Calientes farther west are mainly responsible for removing water from the lake.

== Geology ==
The regional geology is characterized by a number of stratovolcanoes with ages ranging from Miocene to Holocene and ignimbrites of Miocene to Holocene age that form a thick layer underneath the volcanoes; the Tuyajto Ignimbrite which crops out on the western and northern shores of the lake has been dated to 500,000 ± 500,000 years ago. Alluvial deposits and lake sediments occur in the whole region; the lake sediments in particular can be found south and east of Tuyajto Lake and form alluvial fans on its eastern side.

Tuyajto Lake lies within a 249 square kilometres (96 sq mi) endorheic basin which spreads out east of the lake; west lies the Salar Aguas Calientes basin. Major mountains in the area are the 5,563 metres (18,251 ft) high Tuyajto north of the lake, 5,060 metres (16,600 ft) Incahuasi Sur southeast and 4,644 metres (15,236 ft) high Medano Volcano south-southwest of Tuyajto lake. Of these, the last two are of Miocene age while Tuyajto is of Pliocene to Pleistocene age; the Miocene volcanoes are weathered while Tuyajto features a fumarolic patch and an eruption that took place 530,000 ± 170,000 years ago.

== Climate ==
The climate is dry, with precipitation averaging 150–200 millimetres per year (5.9–7.9 in/year) and 200–250 millimetres per year (7.9–9.8 in/year) at above 4,000 metres (13,000 ft) elevation. Moisture originates from the Atlantic Ocean, the equatorial Pacific and the Gran Chaco in Argentina; it falls mostly during winter unlike the rest of the Altiplano where summer precipitation dominates. Potential evaporation reaches 1.5 metres per year (59 in/year).

Precipitation is variable both over annual and millennial timescales, with complex regional variations during El Nino and La Nina years and with past increases during the Central Andean Pluvial Events between 18,000 – 14,100 and 13,600 – 10,600 years ago, during which Lake Tuyajto rose. Conversely, during some future climate change scenarios it might dry up altogether. Evaporation is about 7.5–10 times larger, reaching 1.5 metres per year (4.9 ft/a) at 4,000 metres (13,000 ft) elevation and decreasing with altitude. Temperatures average about 2 °C (36 °F).

== Human use ==
An Early Archaic archeological site consisting of fireplaces has been found at Tuyajto Lake; it was constructed on a former shoreline and appears to relate to this shoreline. Such archeological sites close to then-shorelines are common for the "Tambillo stage" of early human population in the Atacama. Archeological sites at the lake have been attributed to the "Tuina occupation" between 10,820 and 8,500 years before present. Younger archeological artifacts there have been dated at 8,210 – 8,130 years before present.

The Andes of northern Chile have an arid climate in which a number of closed basins at elevations of over 4 kilometres (2.5 mi) contain salt lakes and salt pans. Mining and tourism are increasingly important activities in the region and together with growing agriculture and cities have resulted in increased demand for water, resulting in more research in existing water sources. Reportedly, BHP obtains water from the Tuyajto Lake basin. Tuyajto is part of the Los Flamencos Natural Reserve.
