= Laguna Miscanti =

Brackish lake on the Altiplano in Chile

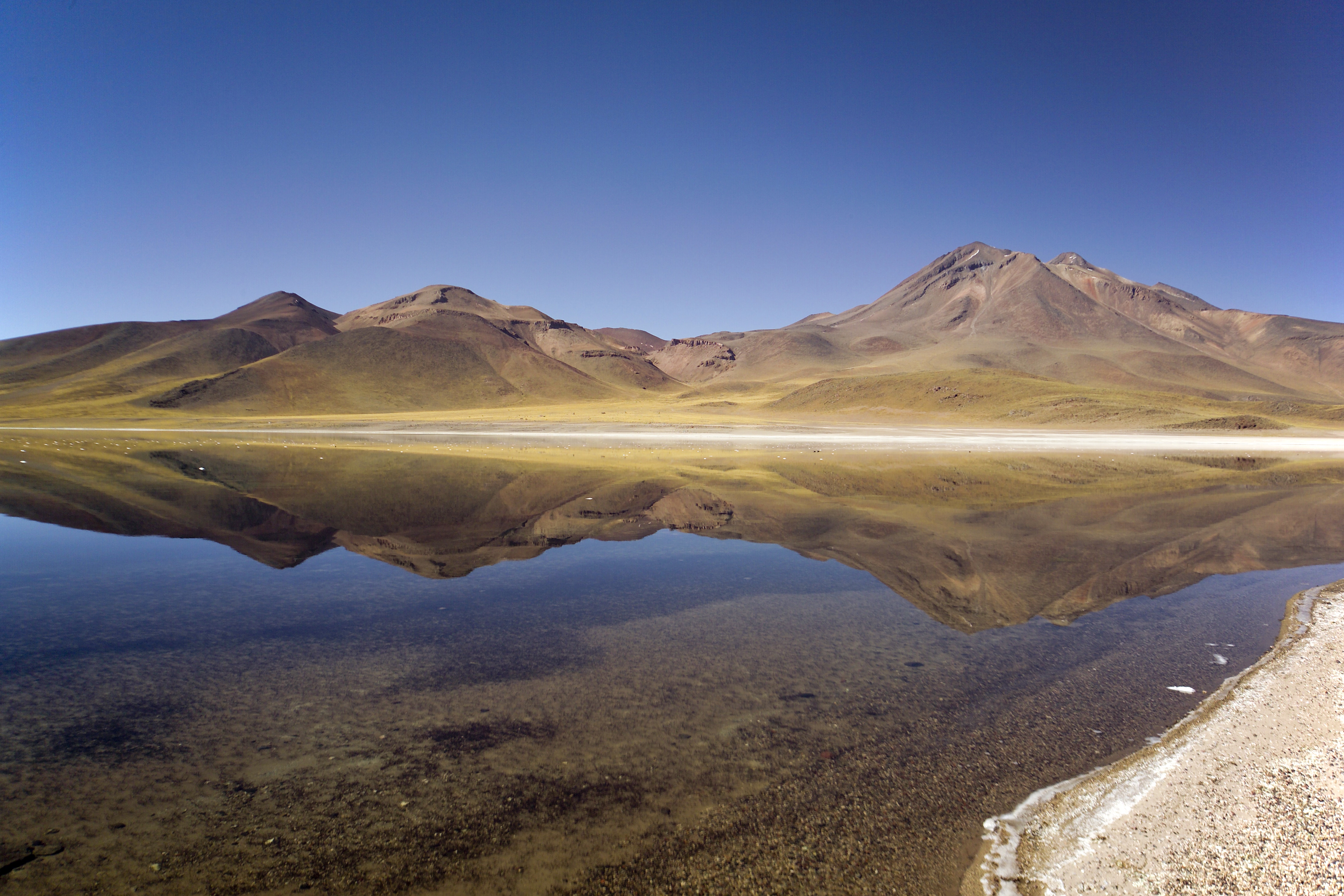
- Laguna Miscanti

- Location within Chile
- Location: Antofagasta Region
- Coordinates: 23°43′30″S 67°45′54″W
- Basin countries: Chile
- Surface area: 13 km^{2} (5.0 sq mi)
- Surface elevation: 4,140 m (13,580 ft)

Laguna Miscanti is a brackish lake in the Altiplano of the Antofagasta Region in Norte Grande, Chile. It has an area of about 13 square kilometres (5 sq mi) and the shape of an arrowhead. The lake has no permanent surface inflows or outflows apart from several springs, and is primarily fed and drained by groundwater flows. Laguna Miscanti is located among the volcanoes of the Central Andes. The smaller Laguna Miñiques lies immediately south, separated from Miscanti by a lava flow.

The lake formed through tectonic processes about 22,000 years ago. During the late Pleistocene, the wetter climate of the Central Andean Pluvial Events caused Laguna Miscanti to grow, possibly until it merged with Laguna Miñiques. During the Holocene, the climate became drier again, and Laguna Miscanti shrank and may have dried out completely, leaving wetlands behind. 3,400 years ago the lake reformed and has persisted since.

Laguna Miscanti is an important breeding site for birds and a major tourist destination within the Los Flamencos National Reserve. Prehistoric peoples used the area as a hunting ground, and several archaeological sites have been identified nearby.

== Etymology ==
The word Miscant, meaning "toad", comes from Kunza, a language formerly spoken in the Salar de Atacama and the Loa River valley. Alternate spellings are Miskanti or Miscanter. Miscanter might be the correct Kunza name and Miscanti a Quechua-language form of the name.

== Overview ==
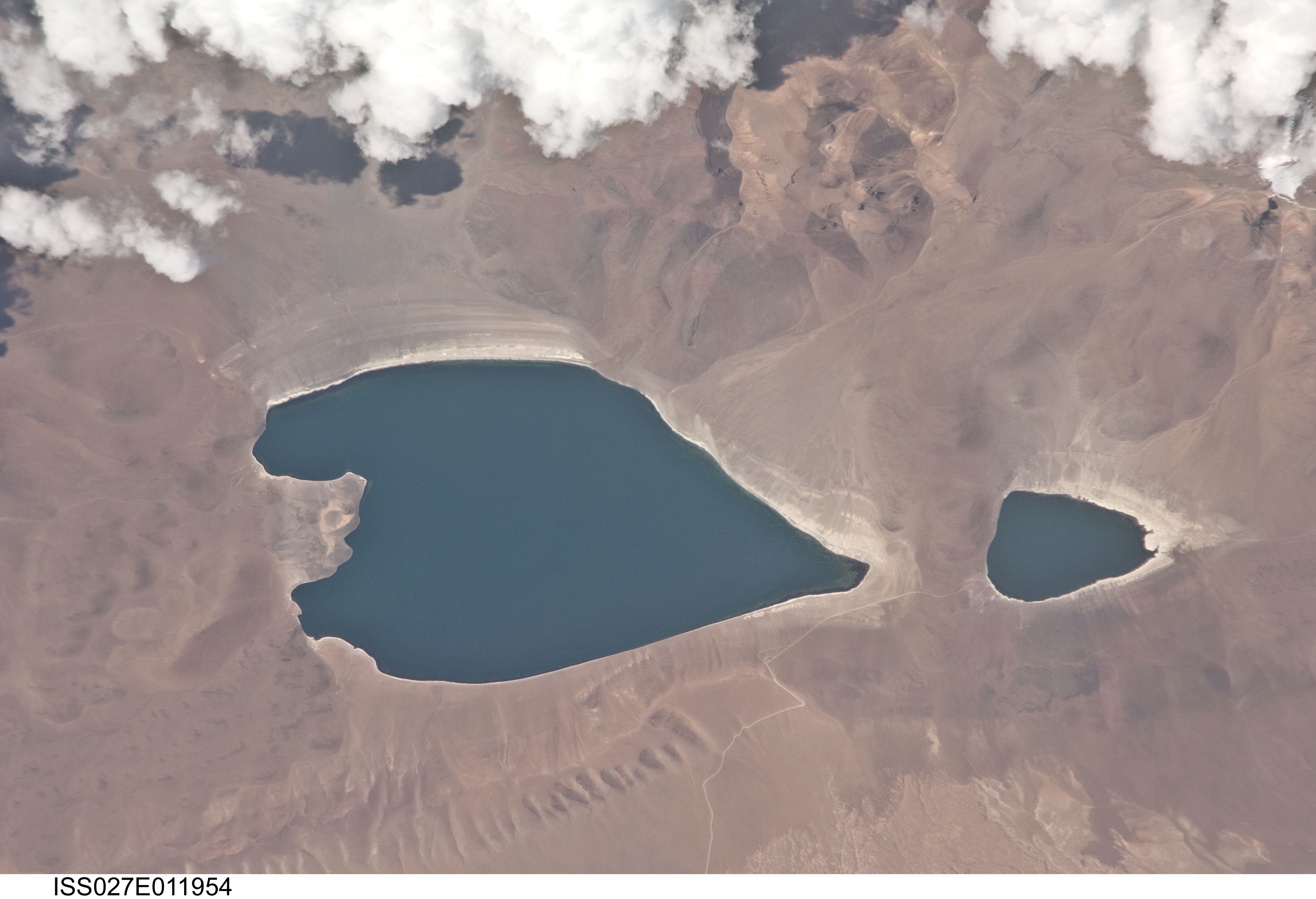
View of Laguna Miscanti (left) and Miñiques from space; north is to the left.

Laguna Miscanti is in the Central Andes, southeast of the Salar de Atacama salt flat within Chile's Antofagasta Region. The closest towns are Socaire and San Pedro de Atacama, 20 kilometres (12 mi) and 90 km (56 mi) away, respectively. Miscanti is shaped like an arrowhead with a peninsula jutting from the northern shore. A road departs from the Paso Sico international road to Laguna Miscanti, where there are several footpaths.

With a surface area between 12.27 and 13.21 square kilometres (4.74–5.10 sq mi) depending on meteorological conditions, Miscanti is one of the largest water bodies of the Atacama Altiplano. The maximum depth is 10 m (33 ft) with the lake floor dropping steeply in the west, more gently in the east and south, and a lava flow dividing the otherwise flat bottom into two basins. There are no streams feeding into Laguna Miscanti, but several dry valleys enter from the north, east and south, and there are two springs in the bays adjacent to the peninsula. The water is clear and brackish, (Note: Salinity is about 5 grams per litre (0.80 oz/imp gal), making Miscanti the least salty of all lakes in the region. The salt is mostly sodium (calcium-magnesium-potassium) sulfate and chloride.) with little or no current. Most water comes from the Cordon de Puntas Negras mountains and reaches Laguna Miscanti underground; this groundwater supply explains why the lake persists year-round, although the role of local climatic conditions is less certain.

The lake has no surface outflow and most water leaves Laguna Miscanti through evaporation, making it a closed basin. Some water drains underground into Laguna Miñiques (1.5 km or 0.9 mi to the south and 10 m or 33 ft lower in elevation) and possibly to Salar de Atacama. The removal of salts through this outflow prevents Miscanti from becoming a salt pan. The lake produces banded muddy sediments consisting of fossil charophyte and diatom remnants, salts (Note: Aragonite, calcite, dolomite, gypsum and opal.) and volcanic tephra.

A low ridge, probably of Pleistocene age, separates Miscanti from Miñiques. West of the lake is the Chuculaqui or Miscanti Ridge. The surrounding terrain is covered by lake sediments, including calcarenite, diatomite, gravel and sand. Former shorelines occur at distances approaching 1 km (0.6 mi) from the present-day lake shore.

Wide image of Laguna Miscanti

=== Palaeolake ===
In the past, Laguna Miscanti was more than twice as large as it is today, covering an area of 38.2 square kilometres (14.7 sq mi). Its water levels were about 29 m (95 ft) higher than today, reaching an altitude of 4,179 m (13,711 ft), and may have merged with Laguna Miñiques or formed a lake chain with it. During former episodes of maximum water level (highstands), Miscanti overflowed into the Pampa Varela basin south-southwest of Miñiques, where former shorelines are visible. The lake submerged alluvial fans and left behind beach terraces, lake sediments and wave-cut platforms. The sediments consist of stromatolithes, sand, pyroclastic rocks, gravel, diatomites and calcarenites. The sediment sequence at Miscanti resembles that at Miñiques, Lejia and Tuyajto, and was deposited at a rate of about 1 millimetre per year (0.039 in/year), eventually reaching a thickness of 6–10 m (20–33 ft) in sediment cores.

There was more life in the lake during the highstand: Algal bioherms and stromatolithes grew in the water and along the shores. Fossils indicate the presence of the green algae Botryococcus patagonicum, Botryococcus pila and Pediastrum integrum, and of Ranunculus plants.

== Geology and geomorphology ==
The catchment of the lake consists mainly of volcanic and sedimentary rocks ranging from Miocene to Holocene age and covers a surface area of 320 square kilometres (120 sq mi). The catchment contains several Quaternary volcanoes rising to 5,000–6,000 m (16,000–20,000 ft). Among these are Cerro Miscanti (5,622 m or 18,445 ft) and Cerro Miñiques (5,910 m or 19,390 ft) northeast and south of the lake, respectively. The volcanoes are part of the Andean Volcanic Belt, created by the subduction of the Nazca Plate under the South American Plate.

The region is characterized by north-south-trending mountain chains, which separate various basins occupied by salt flats or lakes. The lakes Laguna Lejia, Laguna Miscanti and Laguna Miñiques occupy basins formed by the Pliocene and Pleistocene reactivation of the 100-kilometre-long (62 mi) Quebrada Nacimiento fault (Note: Also known as the Miscanti fault) west of Laguna Miscanti. The fault extends from the Purico complex at Llano de Chajnantor to Cerro Miñiques, and is one of the most important faults in the region. Groundwater flow into and out of Laguna Miscanti occurs along the Quebrada Nacimiento fault.

The Quebrada Nacimiento fault is part of a larger fault system, variously described as a detachment or thrust fault system, separating the Western Cordillera from the Cordillera Domeyko. The volcanoes Lascar and the Cerros Saltar and Corona north and south of Lascar are situated on the fault, they possibly formed under its influence. The Miscanti Ridge also formed through activity on this fault.

== Climate ==
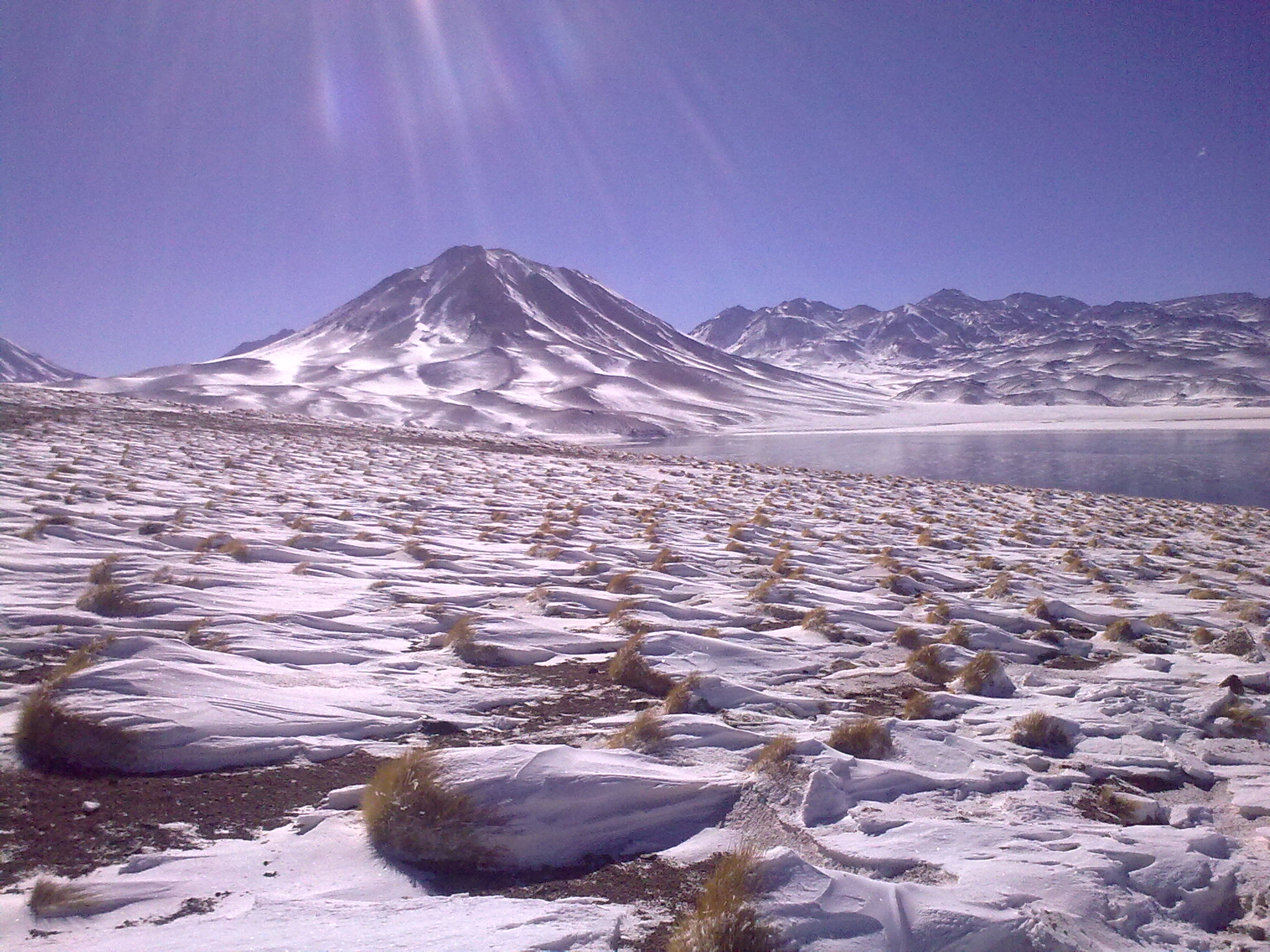
Snowy landscape around the lake

There are no long-running weather records from Laguna Miscanti. The climate is cold, with average annual temperatures of 2 °C (36 °F), being slightly higher at the lake than in the surrounding region. Temperatures vary sharply between day and night, reaching lows of −10 to −20 °C (14 to −4 °F) during the night; seasonal variations reach only 8–10 °C (14–18 °F). Days are usually clear and sunny. Parts of the lake surface freeze over during winter.

The region features a dry-winter cold semi-arid climate bordering on tundra, according to the Köppen climate classification. The annual evaporation rate of 2 metres per year (6.6 ft/a) vastly exceeding the average precipitation of 200–250 mm/a (7.9–9.8 in/year).

The region's aridity results from the Andes rain shadow, the cold Humboldt Current in the Pacific Ocean, and the subtropical anticyclone. Most precipitation falls during austral summer (December–February) during the so-called "Bolivian Winter", (Note: So named because it involves snowfall and comes from Bolivia.) but winter precipitation is significant. Depending on the season, it is brought by the summer monsoon, weather fronts or cut-off lows but its ultimate origin is the Amazon. The El Niño-Southern Oscillation pattern of climatic variability influences precipitation in the Altiplano, being usually higher at Laguna Miscanti during La Nina events when more Amazon moisture reaches the area.

== Geologic history ==
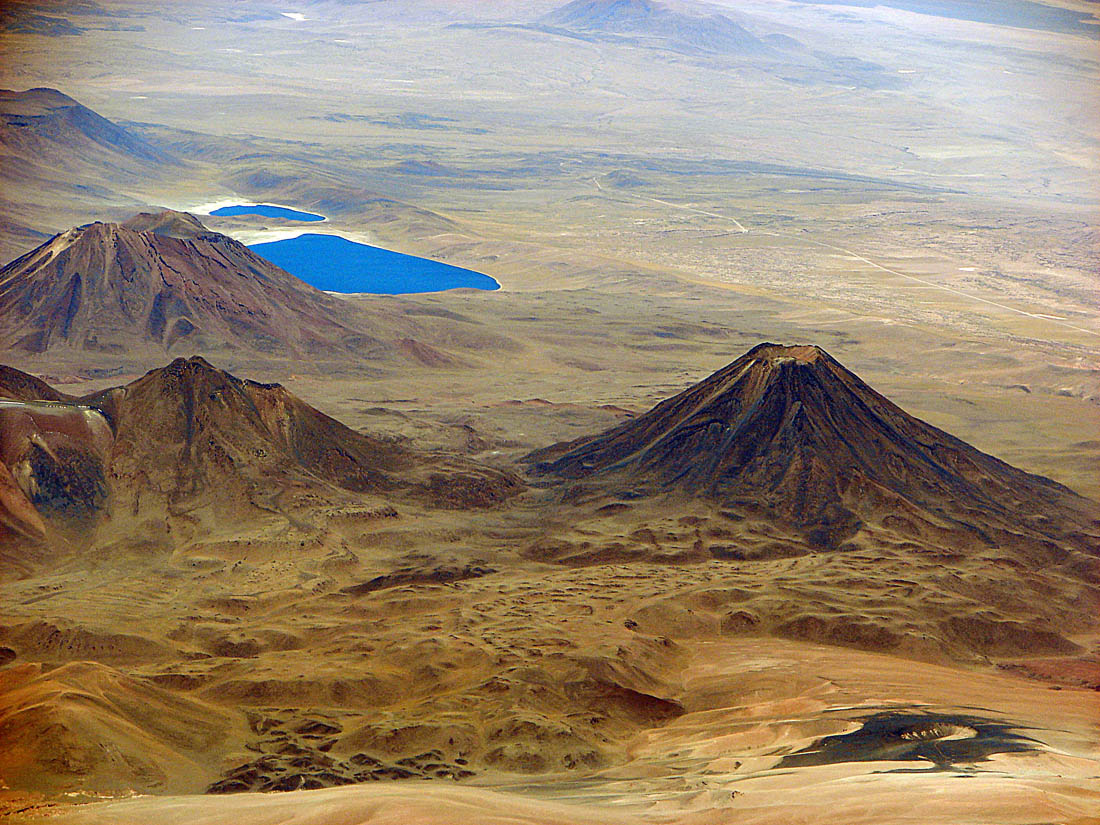
Aerial view of the volcanoes by the lake

Laguna Miscanti may have formed 22,000 years ago, when tectonic and volcanic activity trapped water in the future lake basin. Soon after forming, the lake reached its first highstand. At some point during the Pleistocene, a lava flow from Cerro Miñiques formed the barrier separating Miscanti and Miñiques. During the Last Glacial Maximum, conditions became colder and drier than the present-day, leading to a total disappearance of vegetation and a drying of the lake between 22,000 and 14,000 years ago.

In the Late Glacial/late Pleistocene and early Holocene the climate of the Atacama and Central Andes was much wetter (Central Andean Pluvial Event [CAPE] or "Tauca phase") and precipitation nearly doubled in the southern Atacama. Vegetation extended into the Atacama and lakes formed (Lake Tauca) or grew in size until the water-covered area in the region had reached 5–10 times that of present-day water bodies. Researchers divide this humid interval into two phases: the wetter Tauca or CAPE I (17,500–14,200 years before present) and Coipasa or CAPE II (13,800–9,700 years before present), which are not entirely synchronous between the Atacama and the Altiplano. The second highstand of Laguna Miscanti took place during CAPE II. Pollen data indicate that a stronger easterly wind was responsible for the highstand at Miscanti.

The Holocene brought a more stable, warmer and drier climate to the central and south-central Andes which caused the lakes to shrink. Miscanti became hypersaline as water levels dropped by about 10 m (33 ft). It may have dried up completely, forming a bog or a mudflat surrounded by wetlands that attracted camelids like guanacos and vicuñas. The dry period was caused by decreased insolation caused by the Milankovich cycles weakening the monsoon. A widespread abandonment of archaeological sites, the "archaeological silence", coincides with the drought, although Miscanti itself remained inhabited during that time. The exact chronology of the dry period depends on the site; in the case of Laguna Miscanti, there are uncertainties caused by issues with radiocarbon dating, and some places might have been wetter during the middle Holocene.

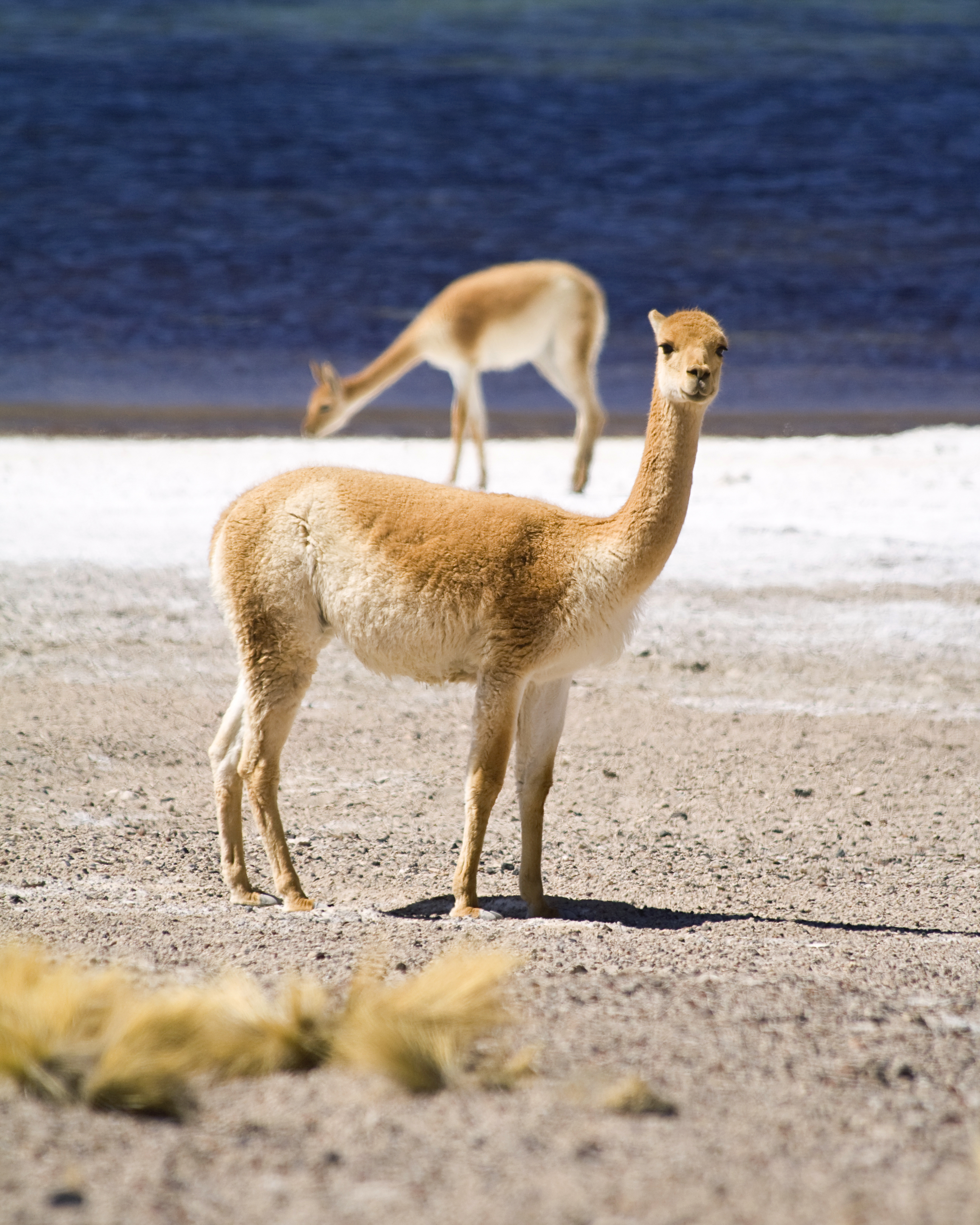
Vicuñas by the lake

Occasional storms caused floods even during the dry period, and there were short (yearly to centennial (Note: A longer moist epoch occurred between 6,500 and 5,000 years ago.)) wet periods that are not always recorded in the lake. The late Holocene saw renewed wetness in the region; at Miscanti the dry period definitively ended after about 4,000 years ago through several pulses of moisture, and human resettlement at Laguna Miscanti took place about 3,400 years ago. The lake reformed 3,600 years ago and has persisted since then. More recent fluctuations include a dry period beginning 1650 AD and ending either 1850 or 1920 AD, perhaps linked to the end of the Little Ice Age. Between 1980 and 2000 water levels were approximately stable, then decreased until about 2015 when another upward trend began. Such variability is consistent with the behaviour of other high-altitude lakes in northern Chile, which have largely escaped the effects of the Chilean megadrought.

== Biology ==
Aquatic plants like Myriophyllum and charophytes like Chara grow on the lake floor; Chara globularis meadows cover most of the lake floor. Aquatic fauna include amphipods, branchiopods (Chydorus sphaericus), cladocerans (Alona pulchella), copepods (Boeckella poopoensis, the main crustacean in the lake and in other water bodies of the region) and ostracods (Hyalella fossamanchini and Hyalella kochi). The existence of the cladoceran daphnids is uncertain. Microorganisms living in the lake waters include bacteria and ciliates; fossils of diatoms and the ostracod Limnocythere sappaensis occur in the sediments of Laguna Miscanti.

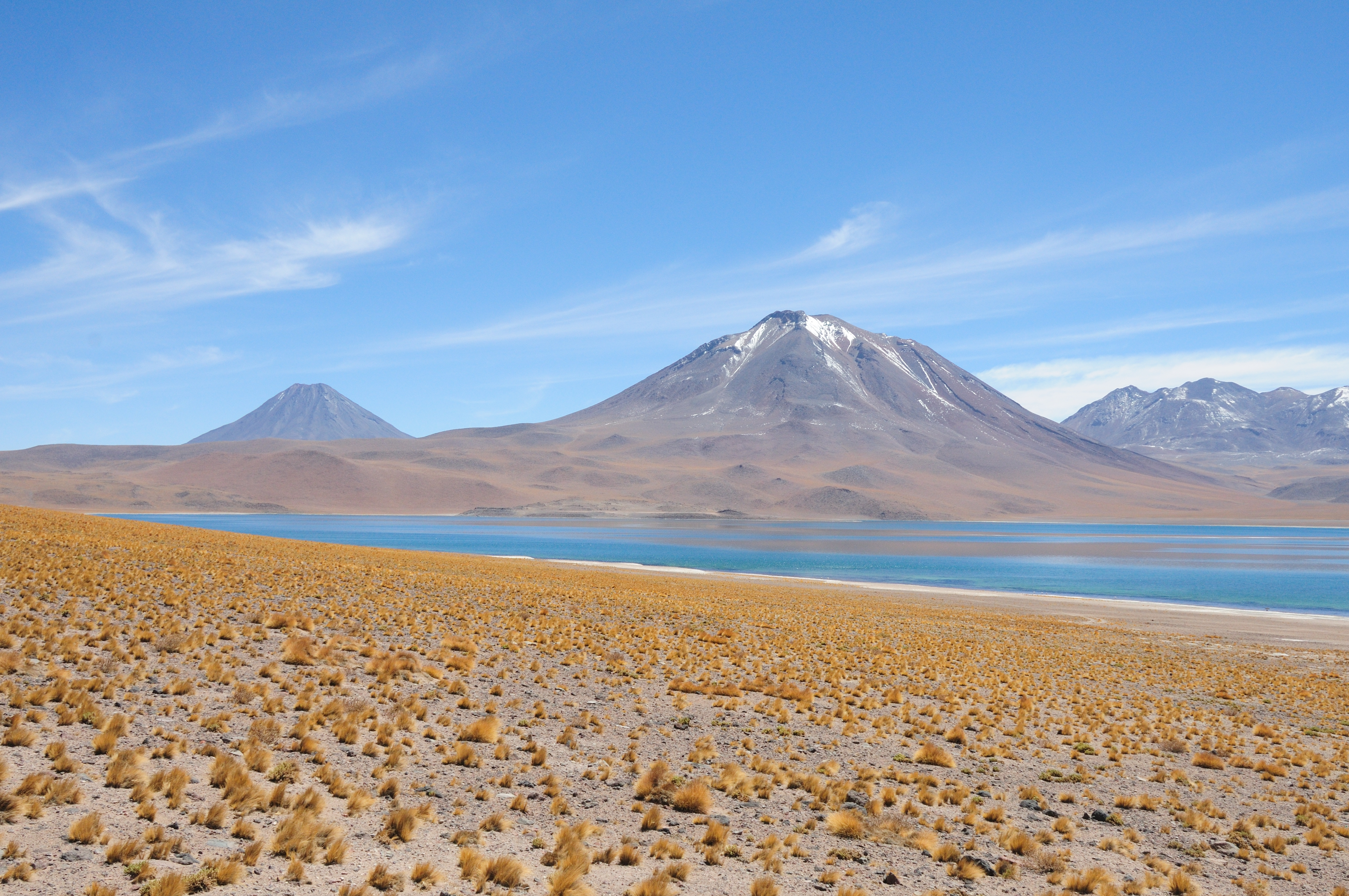
Vegetation surrounding Laguna Miscanti

The beaches and alluvial cones of Laguna Miscanti feature meadows consisting of Fabiana, Festuca, Ruppia and Stipa chrysophylla. Sparser (Note: The landscape around the lake is sometimes described as barren.) vegetation known as "tolar" grows on the surrounding terrain. It is dominated by grasses, along with bushes and perennial herbs; species include Baccharis, ichu and yareta. Above 4,250 m (13,940 ft) elevation, vegetation disappears and the landscape transitions to high-altitude desert. Vegetation composition has been stable during the Holocene.

The two lakes are important breeding sites for flamingos (Chilean flamingo Phoenicopterus chilensis, Andean flamingo Phoenicoparrus andinus and the James flamingo Phoenicoparrus jamesi) and horned coot (Fulica cornuta). Other birds found in the region include Anarhynchus alticola (Puna plover), Chloephaga melanoptera (Andean goose; aquatic), Fulica ardesiaca (Andean coot), Fulica gigantea (Giant coot), Larus serranus (Andean gull; aquatic), Lophonetta speculiarioides (Crested duck), Eligmodontia puerulus (Andean gerbil mouse), Metriopelia melanoptera (Black-winged ground dove), Nycticorax nycticorax (Black-crowned night heron; aquatic), Podiceps occipitalis (Silvery grebe), Rhea tarapacensis (Darwin's rhea) and Tinamotis pentlandii (Puna tinamou). Mammals like Chinchilla chinchilla (Short-tailed chinchilla), Ctenomys opimus (Highland tuco-tuco), Lagidium viscacia (Southern viscacha), Lama guanaco (Guanaco), Oreailurus jacobita (Andean mountain cat), Phyllotis darwini (Darwin's leaf-eared mouse), Pseudalopex culpaeus (culpeo) and Vicugna vicugna (vicuña) inhabit the area. Other fauna include butterflies, including some threatened species.

== Human activities ==
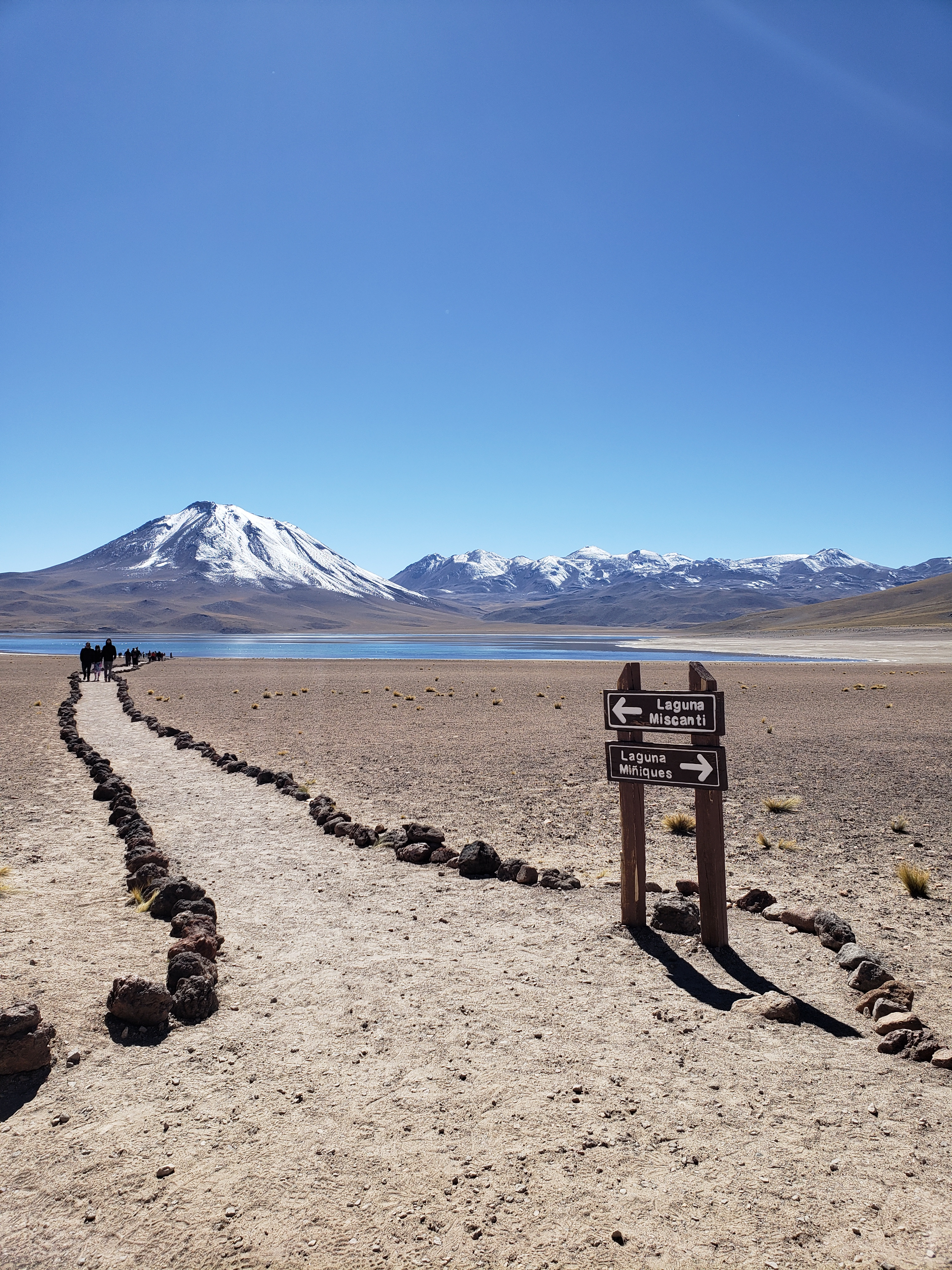
Trail with visitors by the lake

Tourism is an important economic activity in the region; regional tourism is of national importance. The spectacular landscape of Laguna Miscanti and Miñiques, with its surrounding mountains and birds, is a tourist attraction and the lakes are among the best-known of Chile. Political and infrastructural undertakings in the San Pedro de Atacama area during the 1980s created the necessary conditions, with new infrastructure (including housing for staff close to Miscanti) inaugurated in 2004. Laguna Miscanti and Laguna Miñiques are in the Los Flamencos National Reserve, (Note: The national reserve was founded in 1990, Laguna Miscanti was added to its third sector in 1995. They are jointly administered by the community of Socaire and by the National Forest Corporation since 2003. Such joint administration of important heritage sites in the region became commonplace during the late 1990s, as part of a greater integration of indigenous people into administrative affairs. Laguna Miscanti is within the La Grande indigenous development area, a demarcation established in 1997.) and are among the best-known destinations in the national park. In 2002, there were 5,000 tourists at Miscanti and nearby lake Miñiques, increasing to 75,000 in 2015; that year, one in three tourists who went to the National Reserve visited the two lakes. Access requires payment and it is forbidden to leave the footpaths around the lake.

Since about 1997, the town of Peine (Note: One report claims that the city of Antofagasta also draws from Laguna Miscanti.) draws its water supply from the Chakizoke spring in the Miscanti basin; it is of higher quality than the town's earlier water sources. Disputes over water rights and concerns about the use of water sources are commonplace in the region. Water consumption by mining companies is particularly contentious; the "Pampa Colorada" dispute erupted in 2007 about a project to draw water from the Miscanti watershed, including local protests and an intervention by the environmental authorities; the project was eventually halted.

Residents of Socaire traditionally used the area for grazing, and it is important to them for spiritual and religious reasons as well. Laguna Miscanti is of scientific importance, as it has a record of vegetation (including vegetation far away from Miscanti) and palaeoclimatic changes going back to the last glacial maximum.

=== Archaeology ===
An archaeological site ("Miscanti-1") has been discovered on a beach terrace at the southeastern end of the lake. The site contains animal remains, hearths and lithic artefacts (Note: Lithic deposits found at Miscanti include pentagonal lithics and the "Tambillo" triangular lithics (common around palaeolakes in the area). Several types of lithics have been named after Miscanti.) buried beneath volcanic ash. The site was used during the dry middle Holocene. It was presumably a campsite used by prehistoric hunter-gatherer populations, which produced hunting tools and consumed game (mostly guanacos and vicuñas, as well as birds and rodents) there. Another site is Tulan-99, a camp situated between the Miscanti and Miñiques lakes. Other archaeological findings (Note: The Miscanti-Miñiques area, where there are sites with obsidian, may have also been used as a source for obsidian in the region.) in the area include petroglyphs and other archaeological sites. Some of these sites are interpreted as stops along frequently used prehistoric paths, which reflect a seasonal or periodic use of the Laguna Miscanti area. Humans arrived in lower altitude areas first, reaching Miscanti only later, and there might have been seasonal migration to the Miscanti area during summer via the Tulan valley.

Climate variability influenced human settlement in the region during the Holocene, which took place mainly during wetter periods when the environment became much more favourable, (Note: And new archaeological phases began; the Tilocalar phase in the Atacama commenced about the time that Laguna Miscanti filled again although Tilocalar might have been a refuge during hyperarid periods.) retreating to environmentally favourable spaces during dry periods. At Miscanti, wetlands and areas suitable for grazing formed during the middle Holocene drought, (Note: Coinciding with the "Middle Archaic" period in the periodization of pre-Columbian Peru.) thus the area remained hospitable for human habitation.
