= Laguna Miñiques =

Lake and volcano in Chile

Miñiques Lake
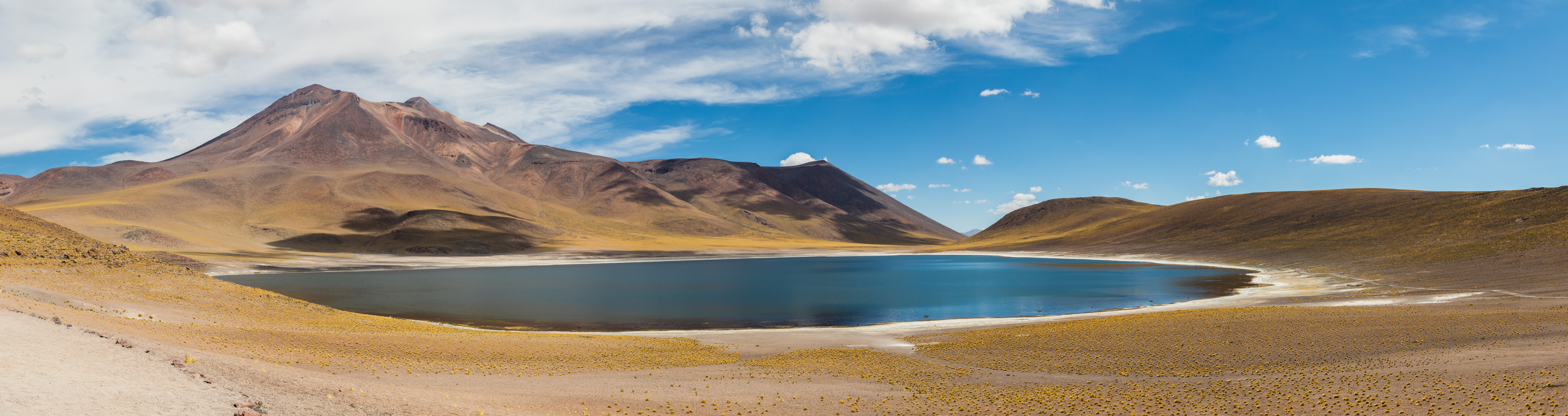
- Laguna Miñiques

- Location within Chile
- Location: Antofagasta Region
- Coordinates: 23°45′54″S 67°47′33″W
- Primary inflows: Seepage from Laguna Miscanti
- Basin countries: Chile
- Surface area: 1.6 km^{2} (0.62 sq mi)
- Salinity: Brackish
- Surface elevation: 4,120 m (13,520 ft)

Miñiques is the name of a lake and a volcano in Chile. It lies south of Laguna Miscanti and at the foot of the Cerro Miscanti volcano. The lake is fed from Laguna Miscanti by seepage and its waters are brackish.

== Lake ==
Laguna Miñiques lies at an altitude of 4,120 metres (13,520 ft) and is a lake with a surface area of 1.6 square kilometres (0.62 sq mi). It is a fault-bound lake like Laguna Miscanti and Laguna Lejia farther north, and receives inflow from Laguna Miscanti by seepage; a lava flow separates Laguna Miñiques from Laguna Miscanti. Like Miscanti, the waters of Laguna Miñiques are brackish.

== Biology ==
The cladocerans Alona pulchella and a Daphnia species, and the copepods Boeckella poopoensis and unidentified species of cyclopoida inhabit the lake. The lake is part of the Los Flamencos National Reserve and a tourism destination.

== Climate ==
The regional climate is dry and influenced by the Atacama Desert in that regard, although the summits of the Western Cordillera have higher precipitation amounts, especially towards the north such as at Parinacota. The dry climate restrains the development of glaciers in favour of a terrain that is influenced by periglacial processes. Presently, the average precipitation on Laguna Miñiques is about 180 mm/a (7.1 in/year) and the annual temperature averages 2 °C (36 °F).

During the Pleistocene and earliest Holocene however increased precipitation resulted in advances of glaciers and in the growth of lakes. In the case of Miñiques, the lakes Miscanti and Pampa Varela (now a dry lake) farther south became connected; a stream delta at Miñiques goes back to that time.
