= Salar de Aguas Calientes =

Salar de Aguas Calientes is the name of several salt flats in Chile:

- Salar de Aguas Calientes, part of Los Flamencos National Reserve
- Salar de Aguas Calientes, close to Lejía Lake
- Salar de Aguas Calientes, part of Salar de Talar
- Salar de Aguas Calientes IV, adjacent to the Llullaillaco National Park
