= Los Flamencos National Reserve =

Nature reserve in Chile

Los Flamencos National Reserve (Reserva Nacional Los Flamencos)
- IUCN category IV (habitat/species management area)
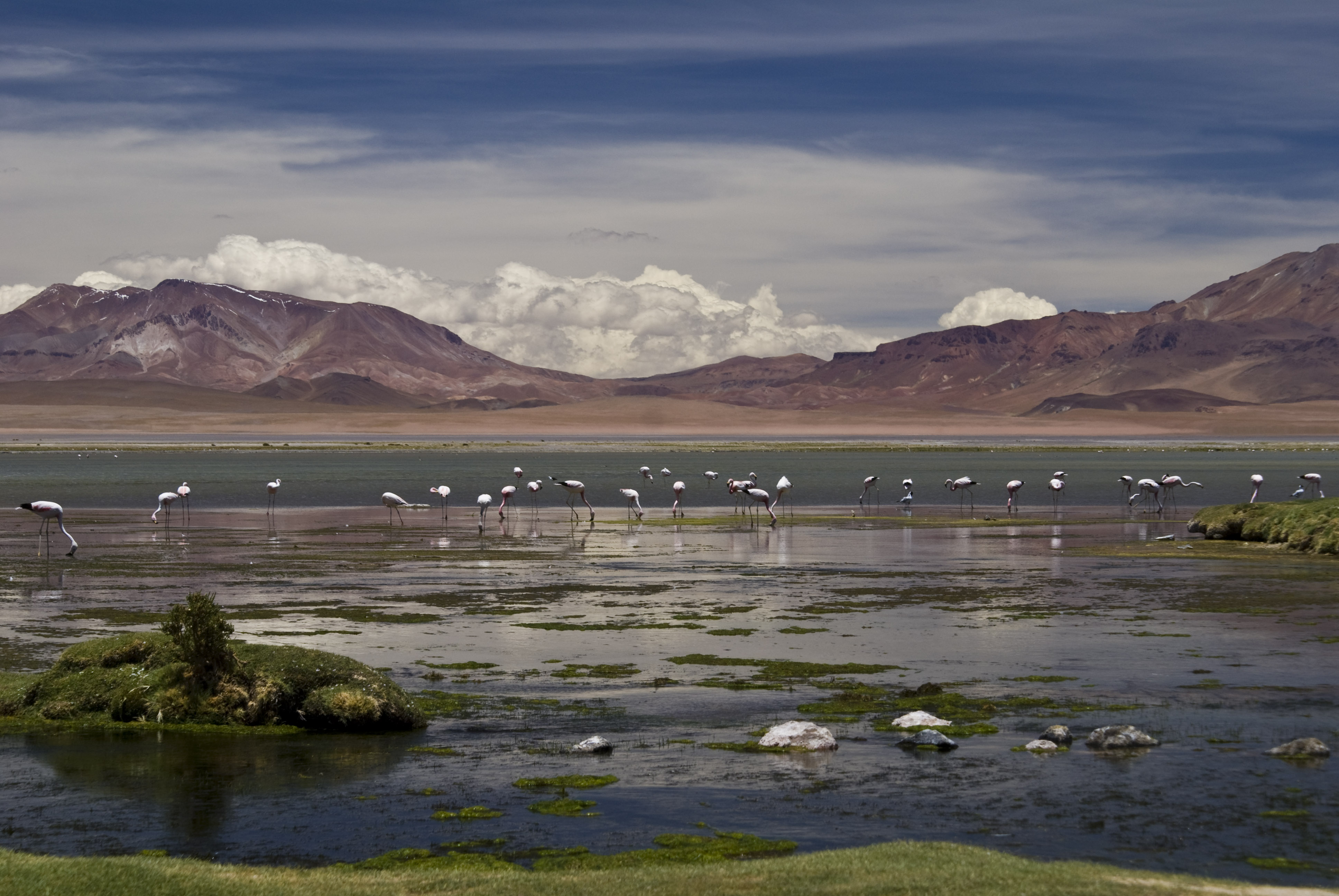
- Salar de Tara
- Interactive map of Los Flamencos National Reserve (Reserva Nacional Los Flamencos)
- Location: Antofagasta Region, Chile
- Nearest city: San Pedro de Atacama
- Coordinates: 23°07′S 67°26′W
- Area: 740 km^{2} (290 sq mi)
- Established: 1990
- Governing body: Corporación Nacional Forestal

Ramsar Wetland
- Official name: Salar de Tara
- Designated: 2 December 1996
- Reference no.: 875

Ramsar Wetland
- Official name: Sistema Hidrológico de Soncor del Salar de Atacama
- Designated: 2 December 1996
- Reference no.: 876

Ramsar Wetland
- Official name: Salar de Pujsa
- Designated: 14 August 2009
- Reference no.: 1871

Los Flamencos National Reserve is a nature reserve located in the commune of San Pedro de Atacama, Antofagasta Region of northern Chile. The reserve covers a total area of 740 square kilometres (290 mi^{2}) in the Central Andean dry puna ecoregion and consists of seven separate sections.

== Climate ==
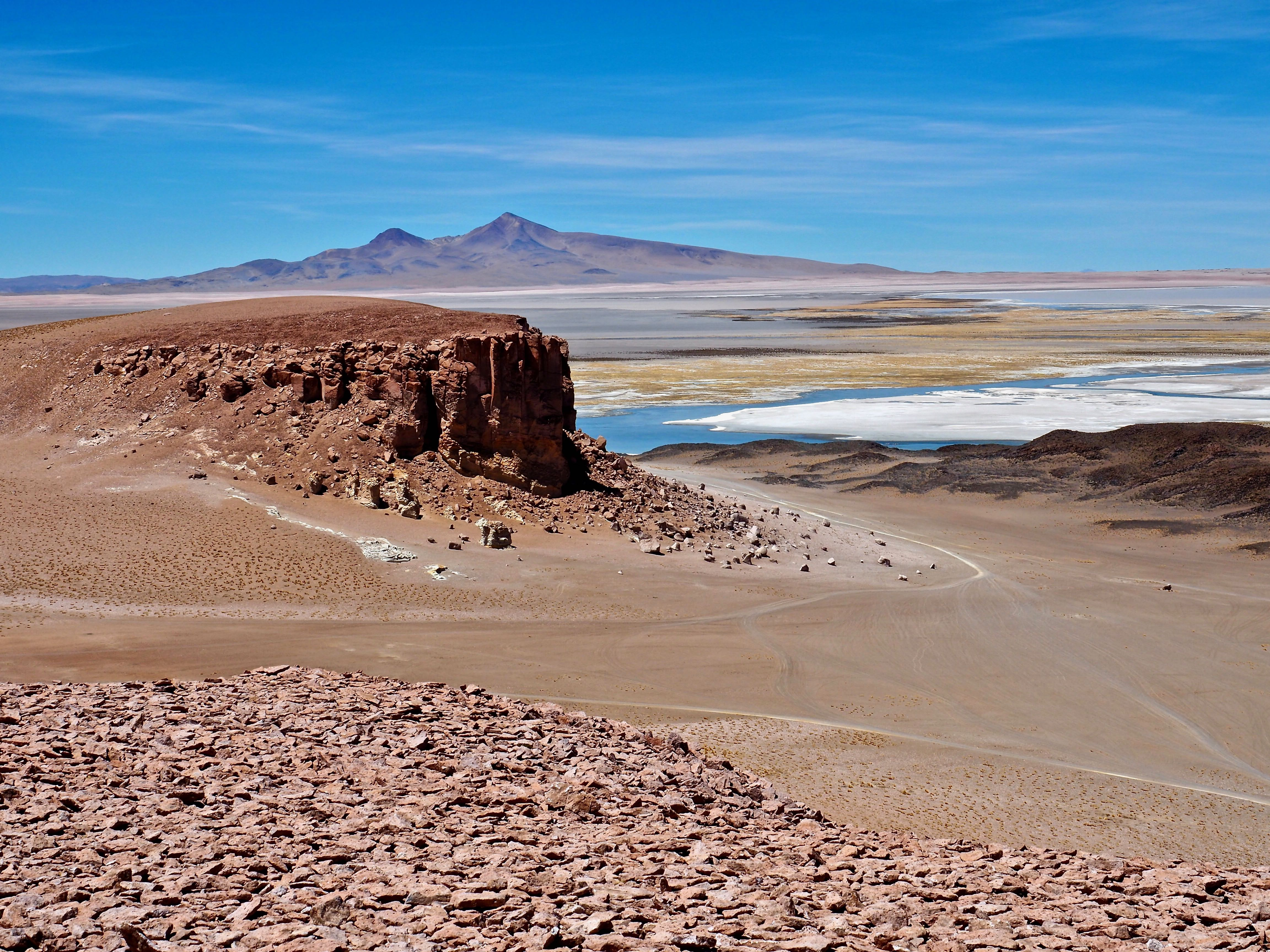
Salar de Tare, Atacama Desert

The reserve has a desert climate with the temperature varying dramatically between day (average temperature high is 25.3 °C (77.5 °F)) and night (average low is 3.7 °C (38.7 °F)). Rain is more frequent in summer, with an average high of 3 millimeters.

Monthly Temperature
Month	Low	High	Season
January	10 °C (50 °F)	27 °C (81 °F)	Summer
February	9 °C (48 °F)	25 °C (77 °F)	Summer
March	5 °C (41 °F)	24 °C (75 °F)	Summer
April	3 °C (37 °F)	25 °C (77 °F)	Fall
May	2 °C (36 °F)	25 °C (77 °F)	Fall
June	2 °C (36 °F)	20 °C (68 °F)	Fall
July	4 °C (39 °F)	20 °C (68 °F)	Winter
August	1 °C (34 °F)	25 °C (77 °F)	Winter
September	3 °C (37 °F)	25 °C (77 °F)	Winter
October	2 °C (36 °F)	28 °C (82 °F)	Spring
November	−1 °C (30 °F)	24 °C (75 °F)	Spring
December	4 °C (39 °F)	26 °C (79 °F)	Spring

== Sections ==
=== Salar de Tara – Salar de Aguas Calientes ===
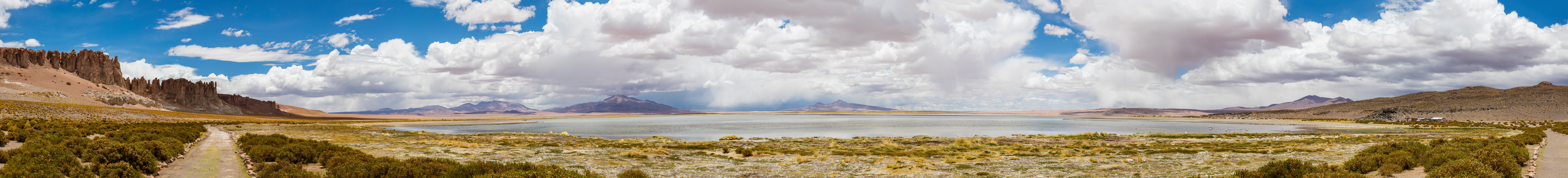
Salar de Tara

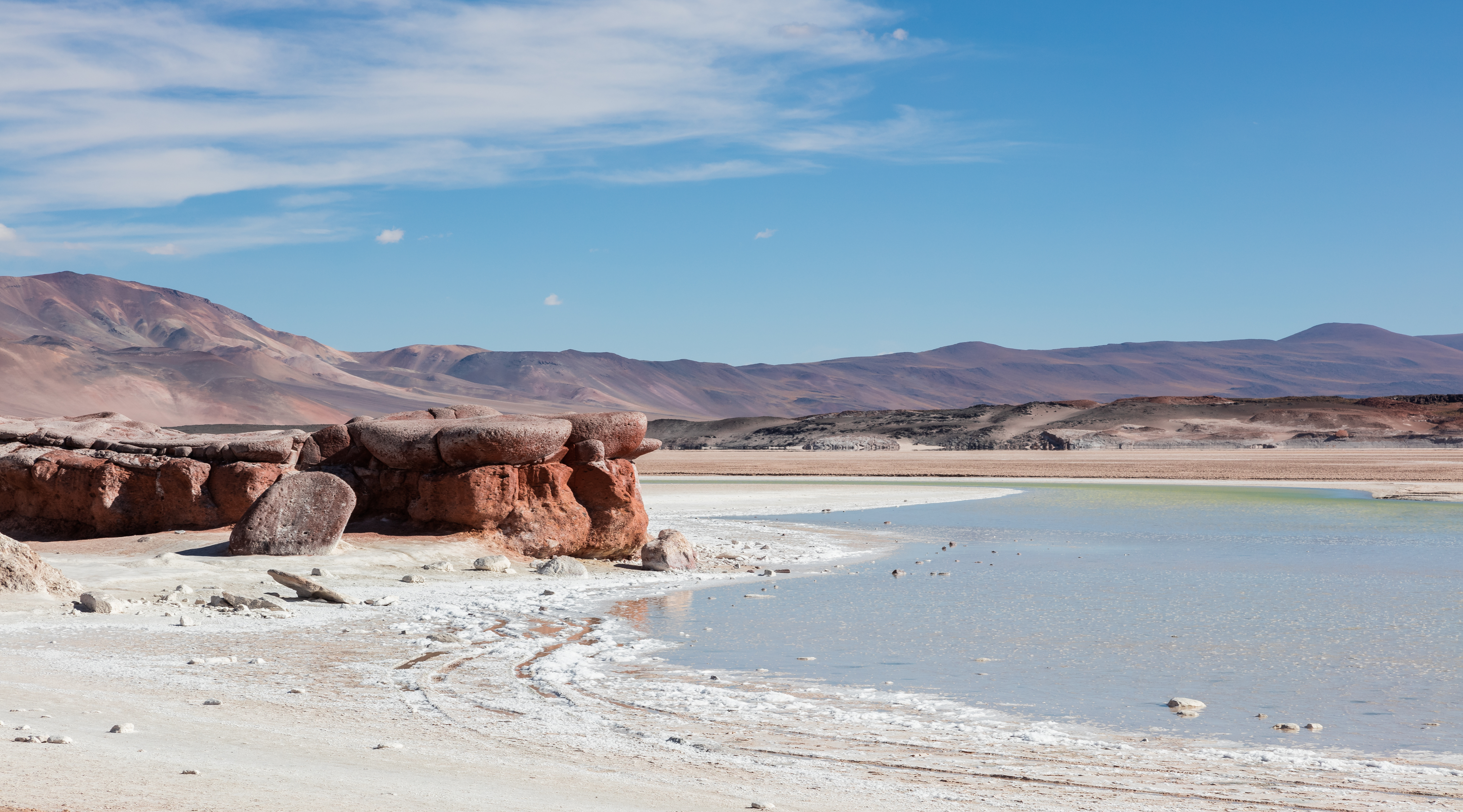
Piedras Rojas, salar de Aguas Calientes

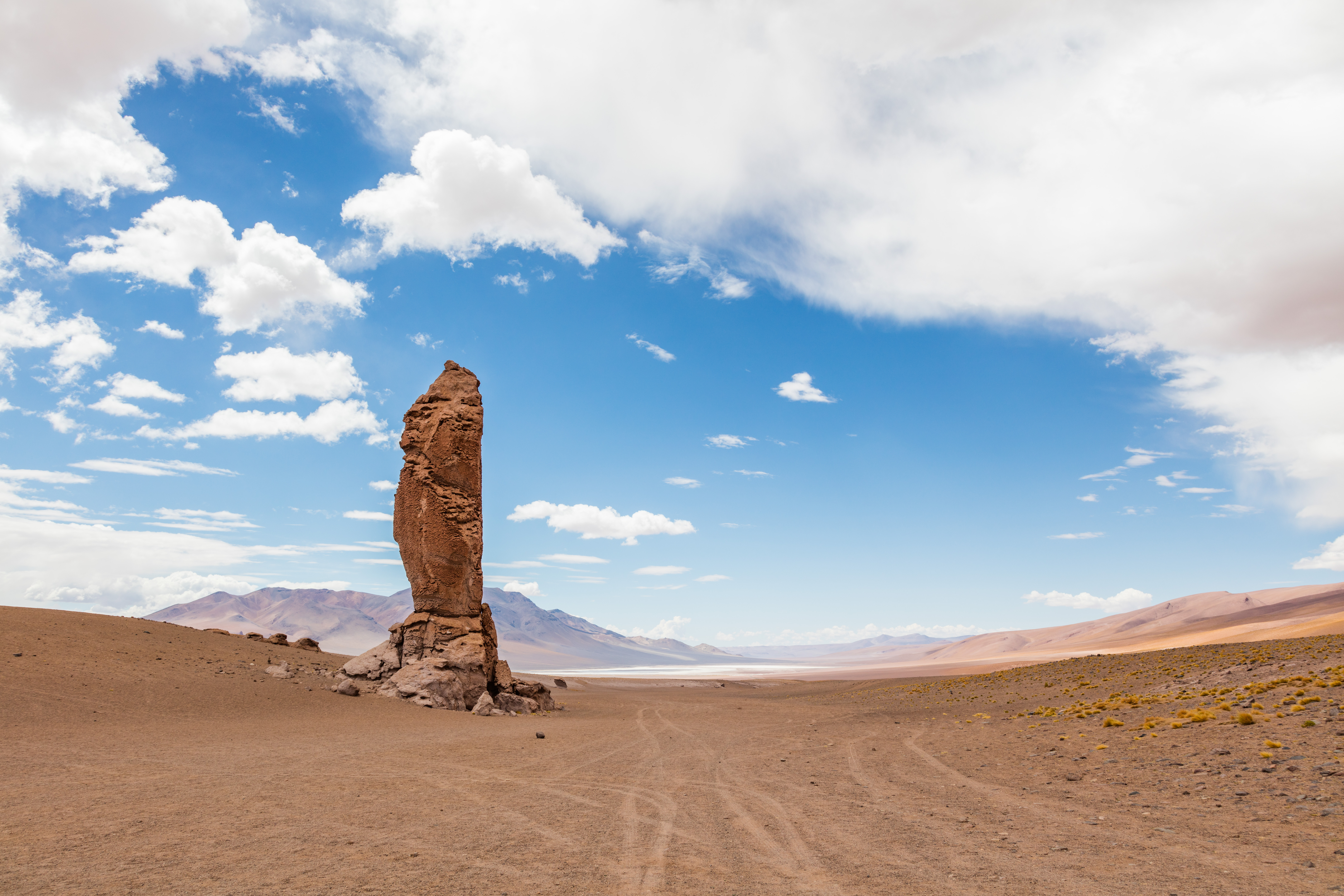
One of the "Monks of the Pacana", huge rock formations created by the erosion of the wind, near the Salar de Aguas Calientes

This area is made up of two salt flats: Salar de Tara, located 120 kilometres east of San Pedro de Atacama and 440 kilometres northeast of Antofagasta, and Salar de Aguas Calientes, reaching an elevation of up to 4,860 metres (15,940 ft) above sea level.

In 1996, Salar de Tara was designated a Wetland of International Importance by the Ramsar Convention. It features both permanent and seasonal lakes. The largest of these is Tara Lake, which is fed by the Zapaleri River. Salar de Tara was formerly filled by an overflowing lake that covered 200 square kilometres (78 mi^{2}) of area and has left prominent shorelines, 24 of which are recognizable on the eastern side, as well as river deltas.

Flora and fauna

The flora is characterized by the presence of high elevation wetland, as well as yellow straw, broom sedge, tola de agua and tola amaia (two species of Parastrephia), and coirón (Festuca gracillima), which can be observed on flat and hilly terrain and on the slopes of volcanoes and hills. Salar de Tara provides a habitat for various rare and endangered species of wildlife. Some, like the southern viscacha, vicuña and Darwin's rhea, are classified as endangered species. Others, such as Andean goose, horned coot, Andean gull, puna tinamou and the three flamingo species inhabiting in Chile (Andean flamingo, Chilean flamingo, and James's flamingo) are considered vulnerable. The conservation status of the tawny tuco-tuco and the Andean fox is unknown. The latter lives in all the sections of the reserve.

Wind erosion features occur in this area.

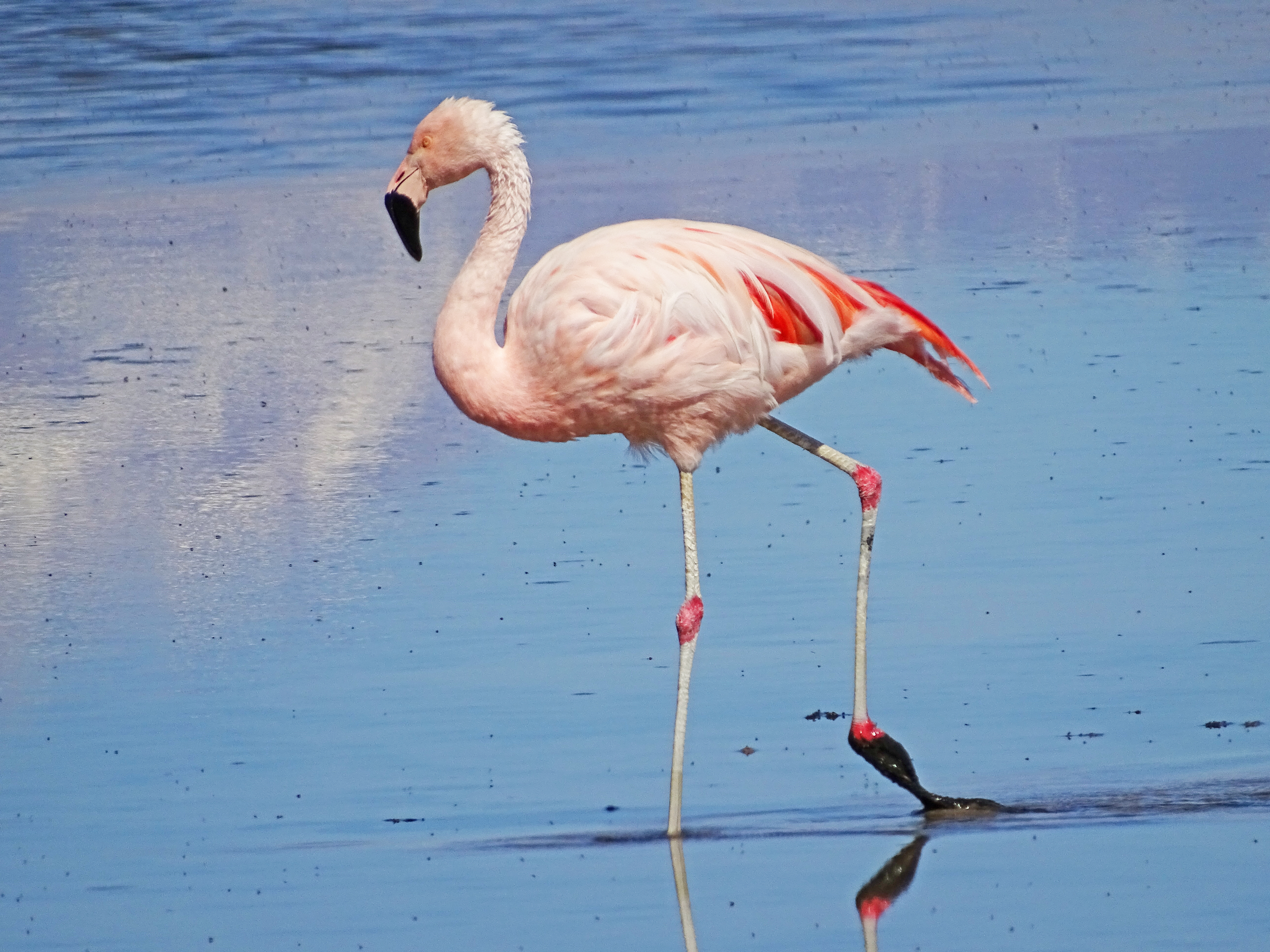
Chilean Flamingo

=== Salar de Pujsa ===

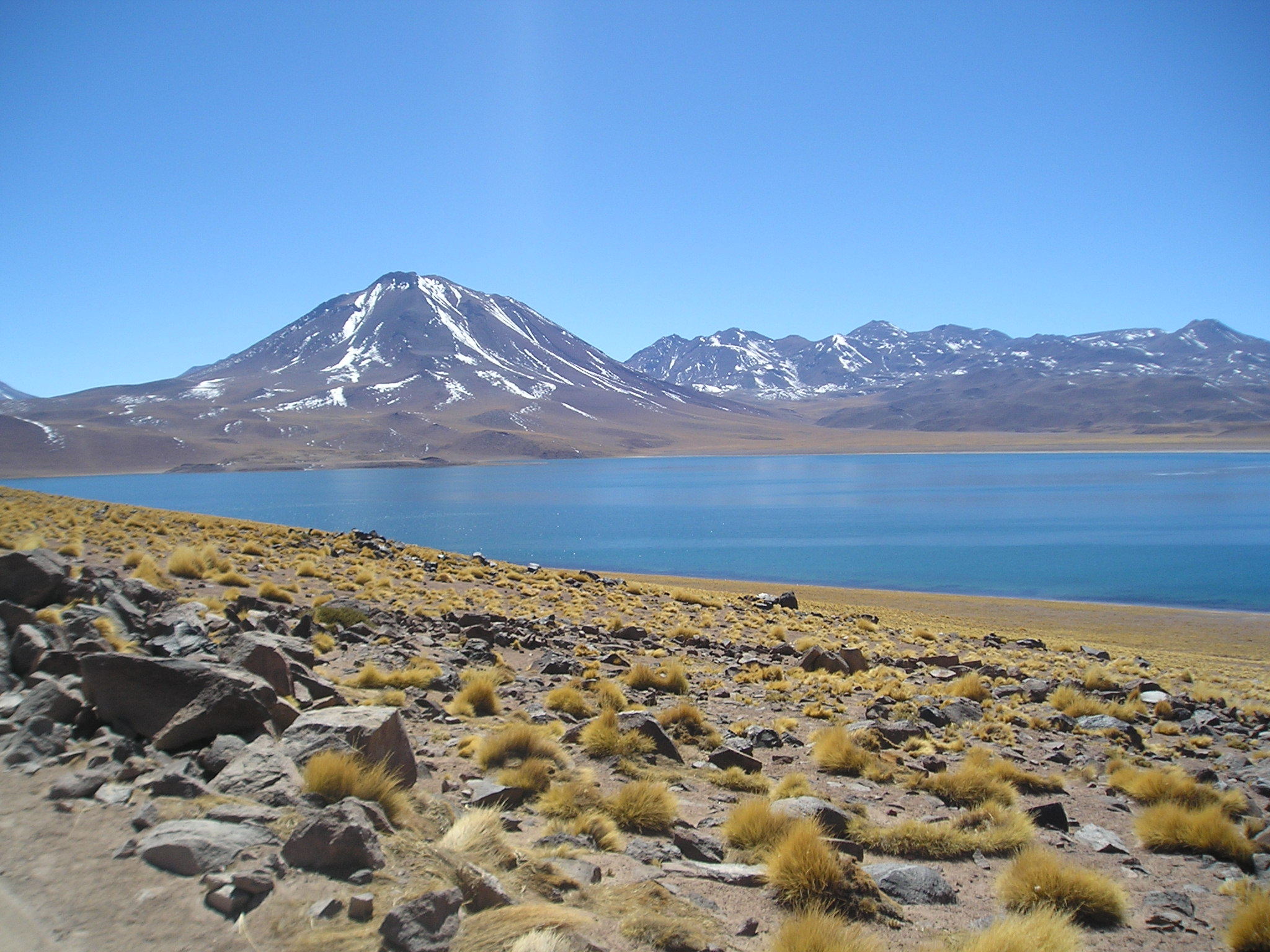
Laguna Miscanti and Cerro Miscanti

Salar de Pujsa is a salt flat located southwest of Salar de Tara, 83 kilometres (52 mi) from San Pedro de Atacama, and northeast of Acamarachi volcano. With a maximum elevation of 4,585 metres (15,043 ft) above sea level, Pujsa is considered the most isolated section in the reserve. The salt flat receives the waters of the Quepiaco and Alitar creeks and was listed as a Ramsar site in 2009. Birds that migrate across the hemispheres use the salt flat and surrounding land as a staging area, including the Wilson's phalarope.

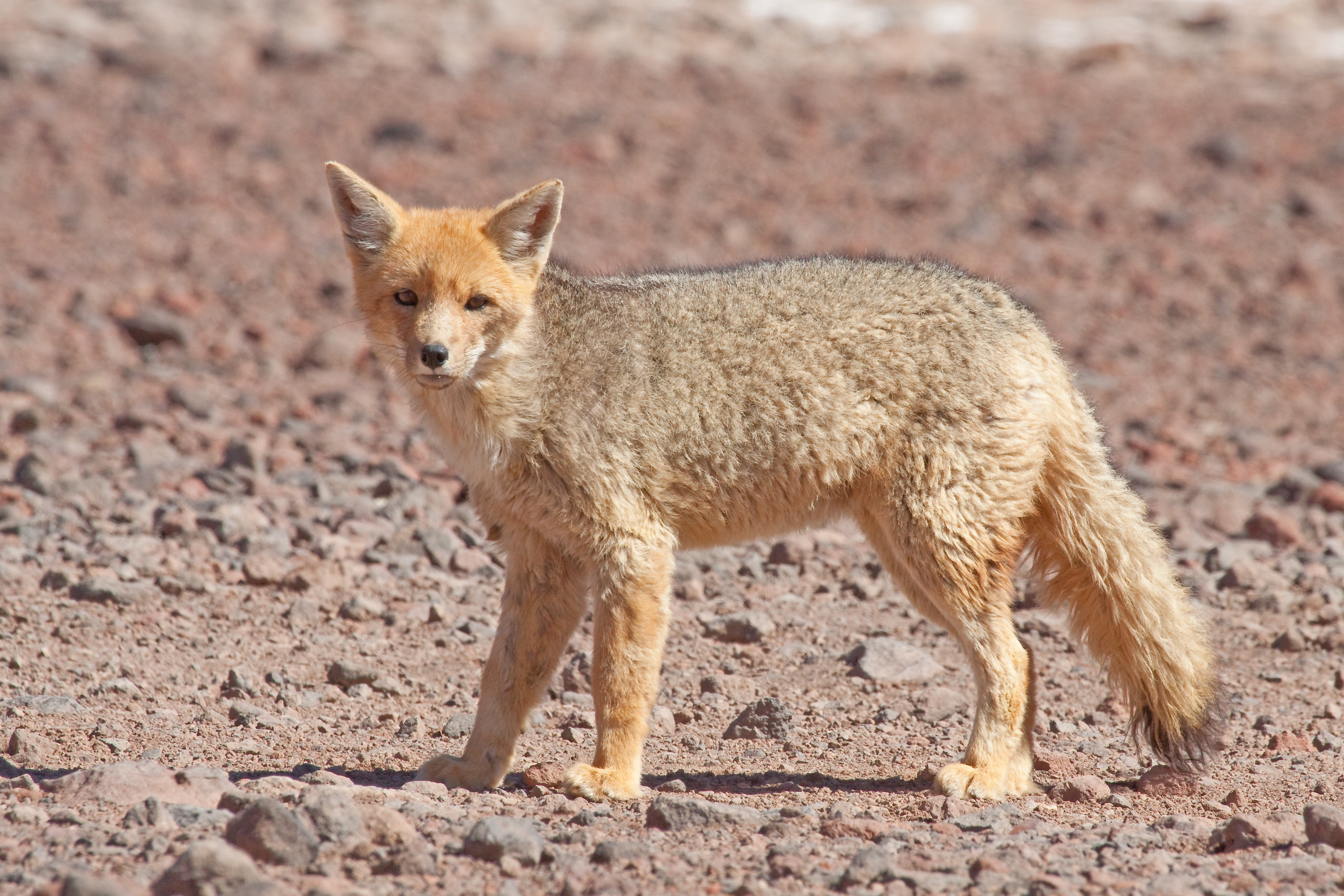
Culpeo fox

The flora found here is similar to that found in the Tara and Aguas Calientes areas, characterized by high elevation wetland, yellow straw, broom sedge, tola de agua and tola amaia (two species of Parastrephia), and coirón (Festuca gracillima), which can be observed on flat and hilly terrain. The fauna includes vizcachas, chululos, Andean foxes, cuyos, Andean flamingos, Chilean flamingos, ñandúes, Andean condors and eagles, among others.

=== Miscanti and Miñiques Lagoons ===
A path around Miscanti lake

A lava flow from an eruption of Miñiques volcano separated Laguna Miscanti from Laguna Miñiques. Located 18 kilometers southeast of Socaire, 100 kilometers southeast of San Pedro de Atacama and 268 kilometers east of Antofagasta, this area comprises Miscanti Lagoon and Miñiques Lagoon, situated in the foothills of Cerro Miscanti and the Miñiques Volcano. The lagoons are between 4,100 and 4,350 metres (13,450 and 14,270 ft) elevation. This section is close to Salar de Talar and Laguna Lejía.

This portion of the reserve is home to a variety of birds, including the Andean flamingo, Chilean flamingo, horned coot, silvery grebe, Andean gull and greenish yellow finch. Mammals include the vicuña, Andean fox, and Darwin's leaf-eared mouse.

== Salar de Atacama ==
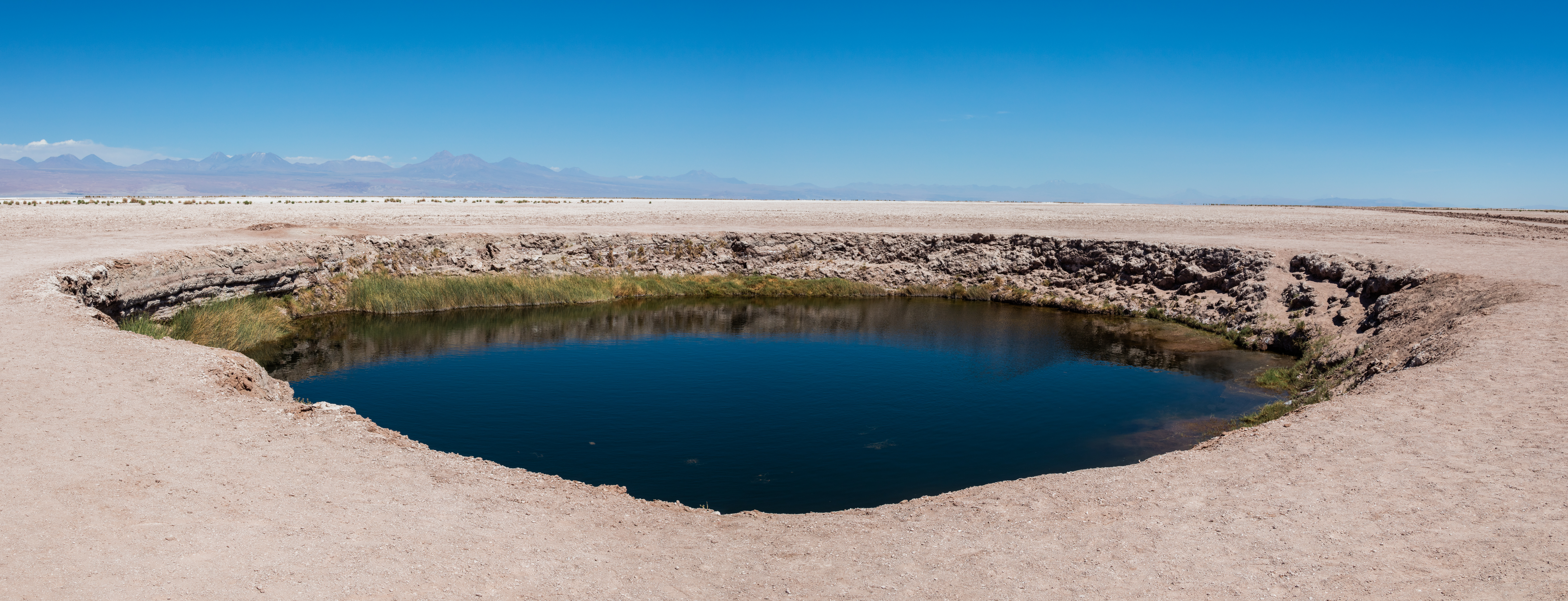
Salar de Atacama

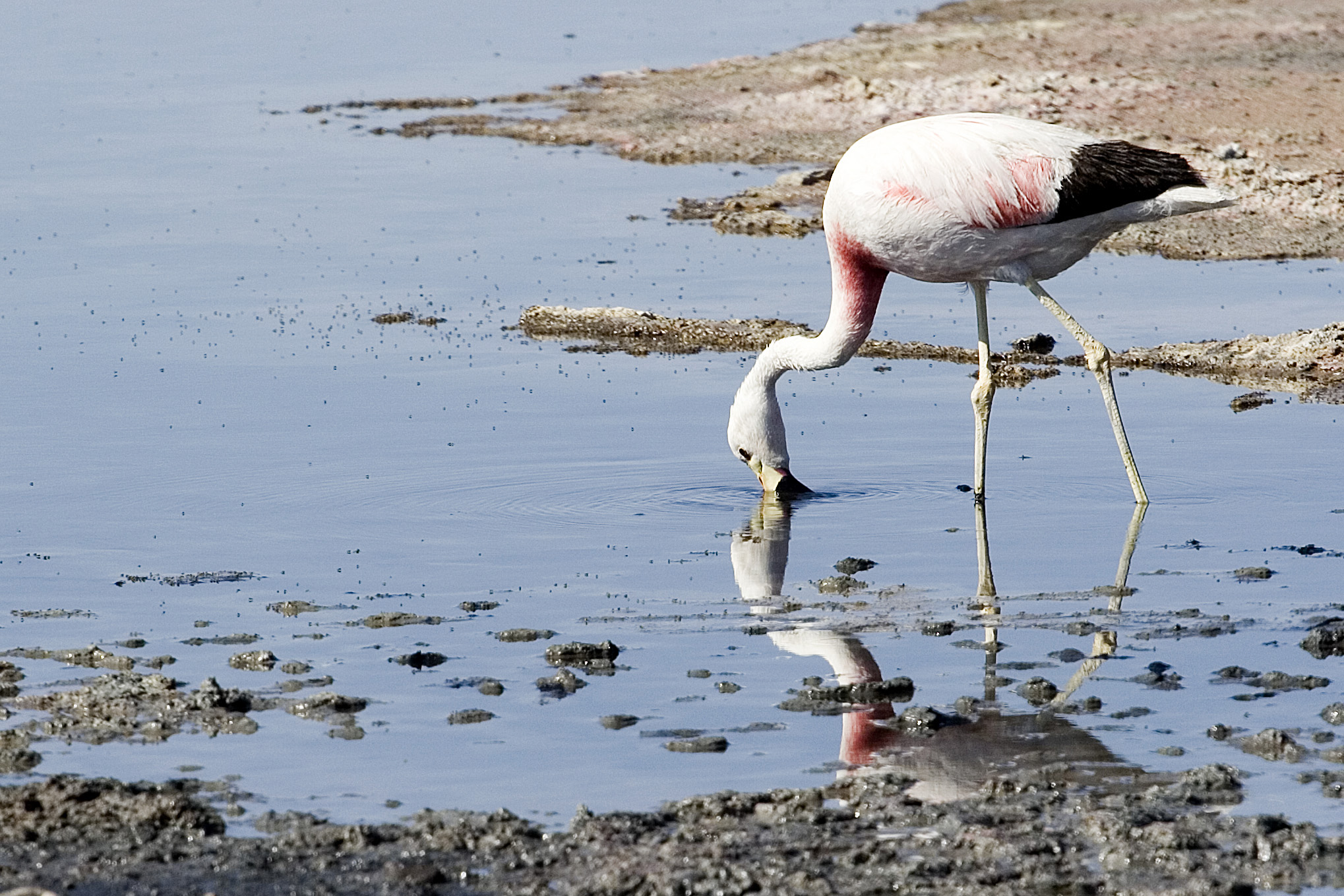
Andean flamingo at Salar de Atacama

This area is formed by two sub-sections, Soncor and Quelana. Both comprise lagoons lying over the Salar de Atacama, the largest salt flat in Chile at an elevation of 2,305 metres (7,562 ft) with an extensive salt crust.

=== Soncor section ===
The Soncor area includes the Chaxa, Puilar and Barros Negros lagoons. Despite the extreme conditions, the Salar de Atacama sustains a wide variety of species including Chilean and Andean flamingos (the latter using it as an important nesting site), the Andean avocet, the yellow-billed teal, the crested duck, the puna plover and Baird's sandpiper. Various plant species ground around the edges of the lagoons, such as Distichlis spicata, Ephedra and cachiyuyo (a species of the genus Atriplex), among others. The Sistema hidrológico de Soncor (Soncor hydrological system), like the Salar de Tara, is a Ramsar protected site. It comprises four shallow salt lakes.

=== Quelana section ===
Located 10 kilometres from the path to Chaxa lagoon, the Quelana section features extensive salt crust and saline mud. The terrain is flat with an average elevation of 2,300 metres. It shares much of the same flora and fauna of the Soncor section, including the three species of flamingos present in Chile as well as eagles, swallows, burrowing owls and geese.

=== Valle de la Luna ===
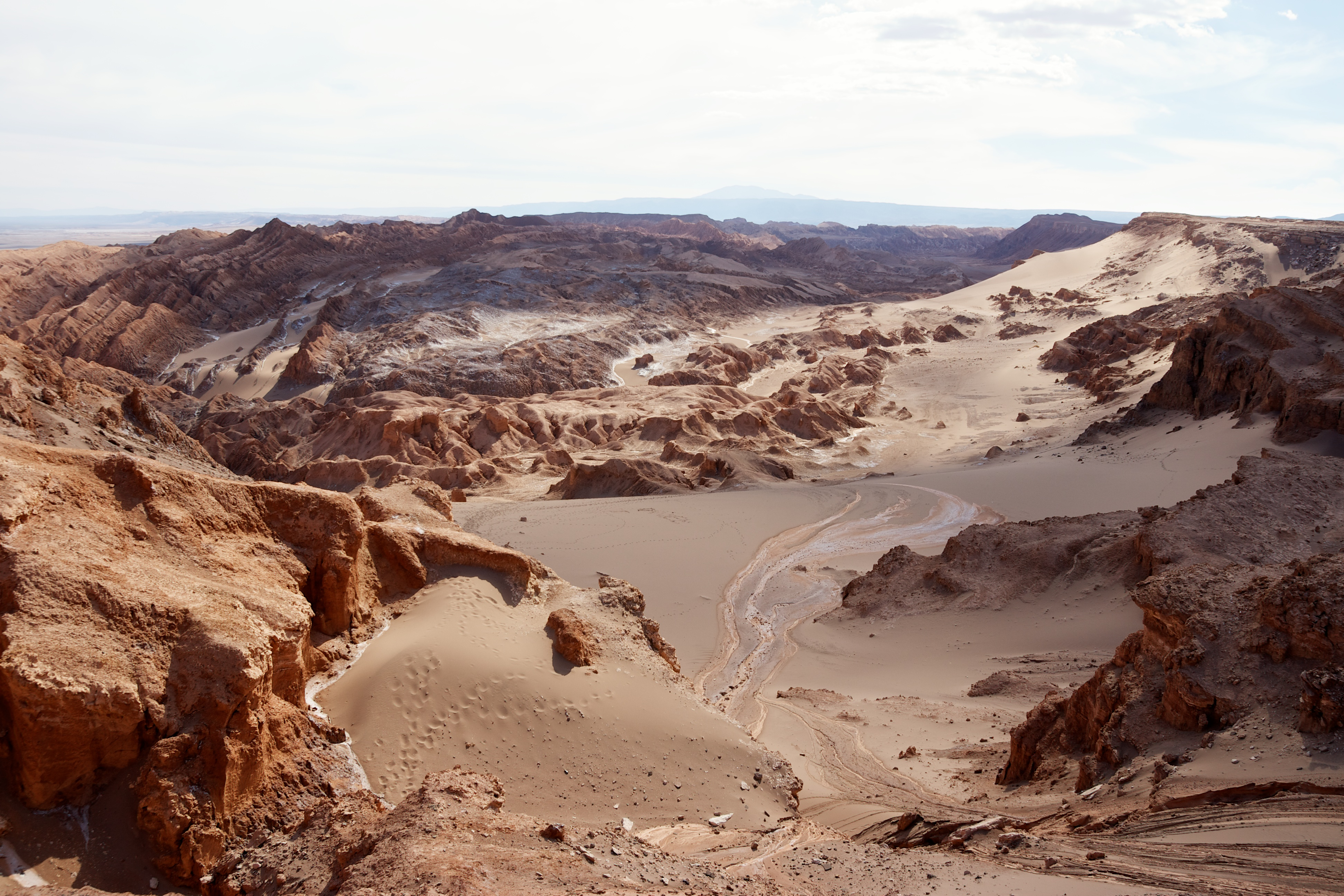
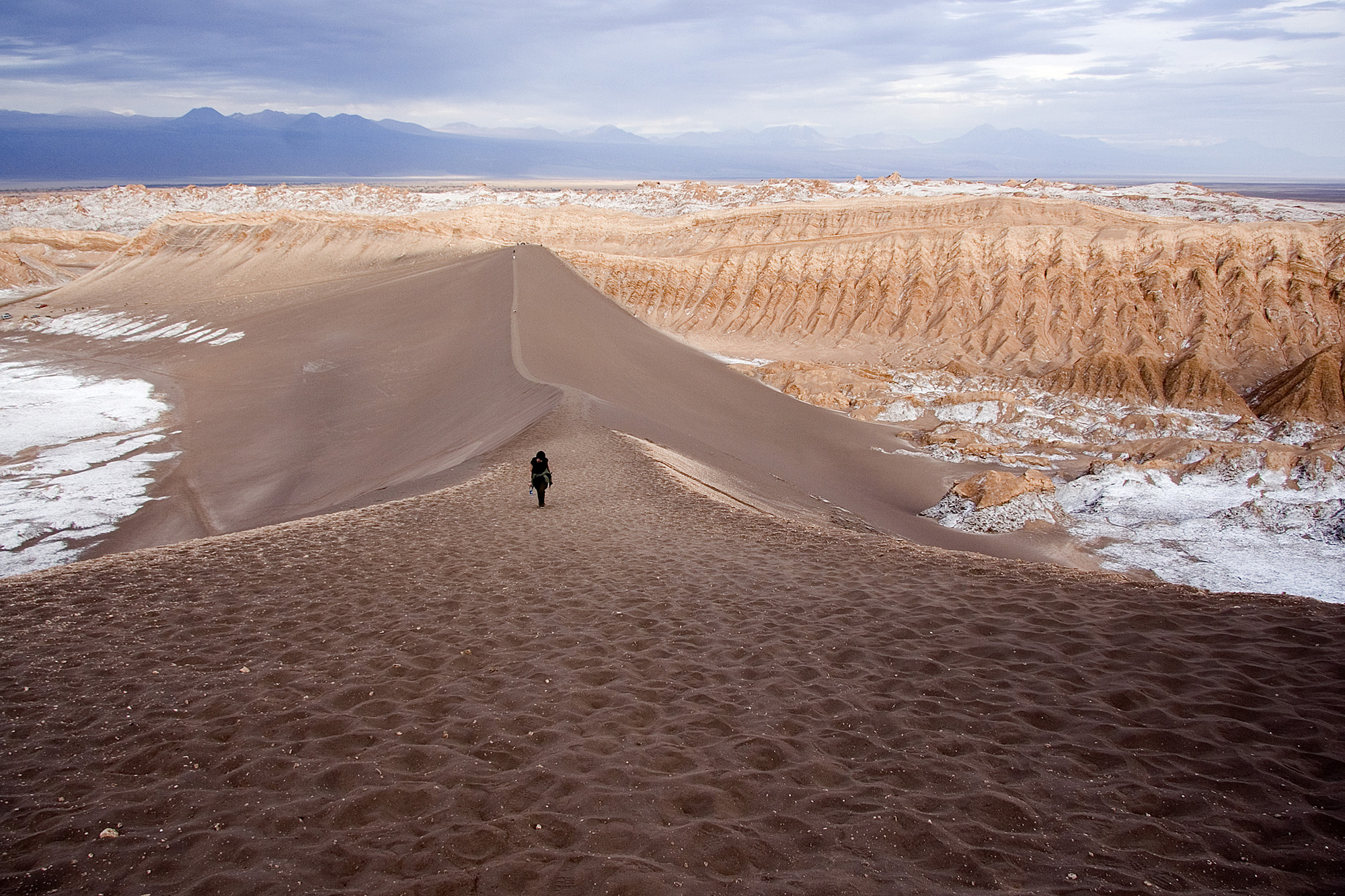
Valley of the Moon

This section includes archaeological sites such as the village of Tulor as well as the Cordillera de la Sal mountain range, which reaches elevations of 2,624 metres (8,609 ft). The range was formed by the sequential folding of an old salt lake that eventually dried and was forced upwards by the movement of tectonic plates. White-bellied fat-tailed mouse opossums can be found in this area.

=== Tambillo ===
This section is to the nearest to San Pedro de Atacama and is characterized by an extended Tamarugo forest (Prosopis tamarugo) of 370 hectares, which is unique in this region.

Tambillo contains similar fauna to the other sections of the reserve, including the Andean flamingo, Chilean flamingo, horned coot, silvery grebe, Andean gull, greenish yellow finch, grey fox, Andean fox, chincol (Zonotrichia capensis), swallows, and falcons.

== See also ==
- Salar de Aguas Calientes
- San Pedro de Atacama
- Valle de la Luna
- Atacama Desert
