= Miñiques =

Volcanic complex in Chile

Cerro Miñiques
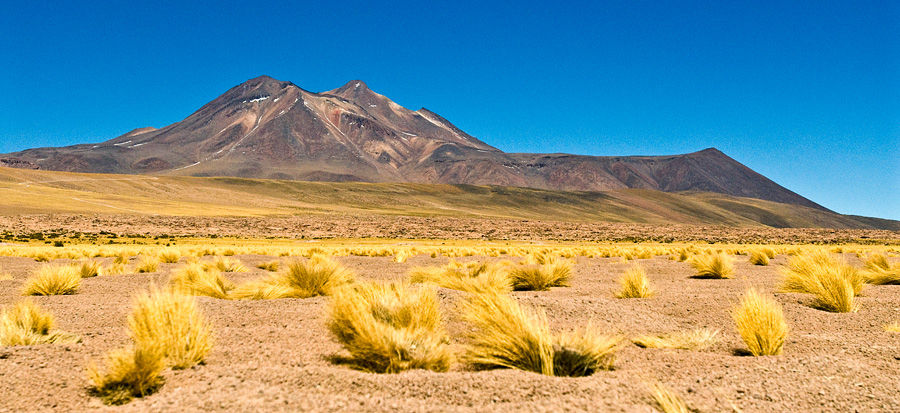
- The Miñiques volcano, seen from the Northwest.

Highest point
- Elevation: 5,910 m (19,390 ft)
- Coordinates: 23°49′0″S 67°46′0″W

Geography
- Location: Chile
- Parent range: Andes

Geology
- Mountain type: Stratovolcano
- Last eruption: Unknown

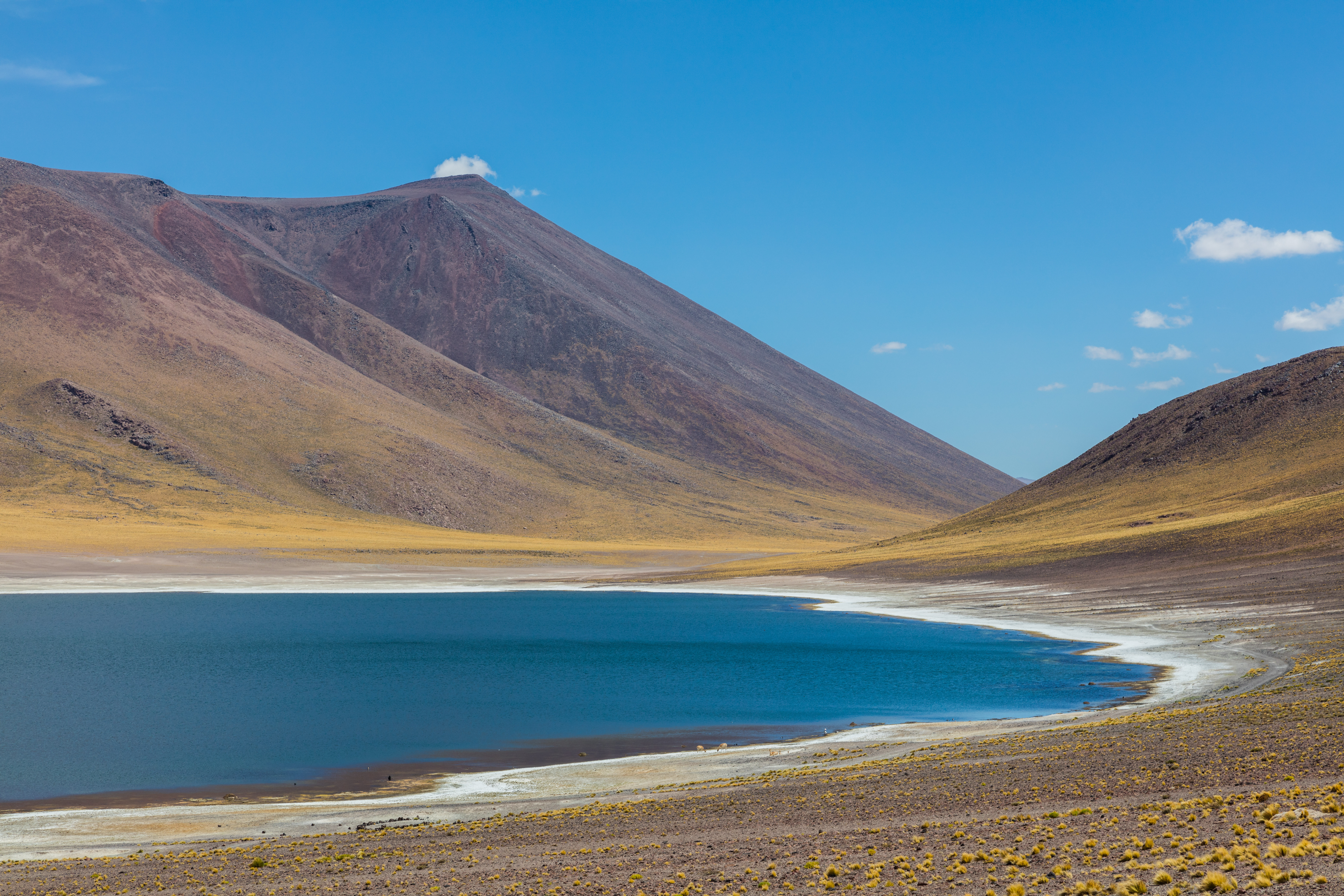
Miniques Lagoon

Miñiques is a massive volcanic complex containing a large number of craters, lava domes and flows, located in the Antofagasta Region of Chile. Located 21 km (13 mi) south of Volcán Chiliques and 26 km (16 mi) west of Cordón Puntas Negras, it is part of a frequently visited attraction conformed by the high plain lagoons Laguna Miscanti, Laguna Miñiques and the Cerro Miscanti volcano.

== Mountain ==
Miñiques consists of four overlapping volcanoes formed by lava domes and stratovolcanoes. It has two summits, a lower northern summit which reaches 5,790 metres (19,000 ft) elevation and a higher southern one which is 5,910 metres (19,390 ft) high. The mountain features two crater lakes, one at 5,450 metres (17,880 ft) and the other at 5,500 metres (18,000 ft) elevation on the southeastern and western side of the northern summit, respectively. A set of well developed moraines exists on the southern flank and may reflect glaciers advancing either from the summit area or a plateau at 4,900 metres (16,100 ft) elevation; overall however glaciation on Miñiques was of limited extent and the terrain of Miñiques today is dominated by periglacial processes. Laguna Miñiques lies on its northwestern foot; it was separated from Laguna Miscanti by a lava flow from Miñiques.

The mountain rises from a 4,100 metres (13,500 ft) high ignimbrite plateau. It is of Pleistocene age and formed by andesitic and dacitic rocks; it formed during two stages in the Pliocene and Plio-Pleistocene. There is no indication of historical eruptions and the volcano is classified as extinct and its lava flows have been offset by faulting, but activity of the Pliocene-Pleistocene volcano may have continued into the Holocene. Renewed eruptions may impact International Route CH-23 as well as the surroundings of Laguna Miñiques and would mostly consist of lava flows, but are unlikely to impact populated areas.

There are a number of craters, some of which contain lava domes and lava flows. Stone structures and archeological sites are found on the summit and the flanks of Miñiques mountain, and the church of Socaire is oriented towards the mountain. The Inca associated the mountain with the god Tunupa and with lightning.

== See also ==
- List of volcanoes in Chile
- Chiliques
- Cerro Miscanti
- Cordón Puntas Negras
- Caichinque
- Los Flamencos National Reserve
- Chile

== Further sources ==
- González-Ferrán, Oscar (1995). Volcanes de Chile (in Spanish). Santiago, Chile: Instituto Geográfico Militar. ISBN 9789562020541. OCLC 35326752.
