= Cerro Miscanti =

Mountain in Chile

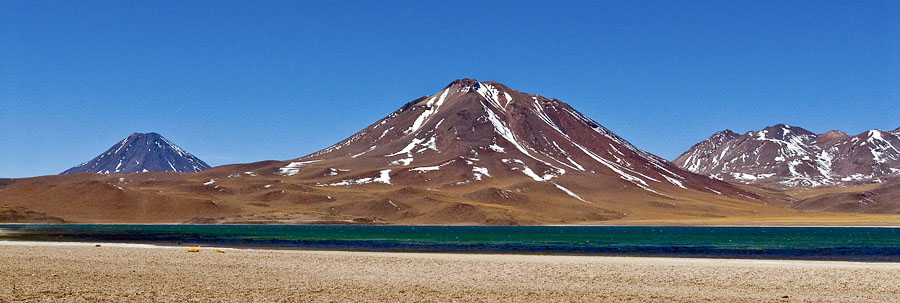
- Seen from the Laguna Miscanti, FLTR: Volcán Chiliques, Cerro Miscanti, Cordón Puntas Negras.

Highest point
- Elevation: 5,622 m (18,445 ft)
- Coordinates: 23°40′25″S 67°42′58″W

Geography
- Location: Chile
- Parent range: Andes

Geology
- Last eruption: Pleistocene

Cerro Miscanti (also known as Ipira) is a mountain of volcanic origin located in the Antofagasta Region of Chile, immediately south of Chiliques and north of Miñiques. It towers over Laguna Miscanti. Rock samples from Cerro Miscanti are of andesitic composition, but andesite-containing dacites have also been found.

The edifice covers an area of 38 square kilometres (15 sq mi) and bears traces of a westward collapse, which exposed the internal sector of the volcano. A new volcano grew inside the collapse scar. Miscanti may be either extinct or may have erupted in the Pleistocene-Holocene. Renewed eruptions are likely to consist of lava flows, which could impact the northern shores of Laguna Miscanti.

An Inca Empire sanctuary has been reported at Cerro Miscanti.

== See also ==
- Miñiques
- Chiliques
- Laguna Miscanti
- Cordón Puntas Negras
- Los Flamencos National Reserve
- Caichinque
