= Cordón de Puntas Negras =

Mountain in Chile

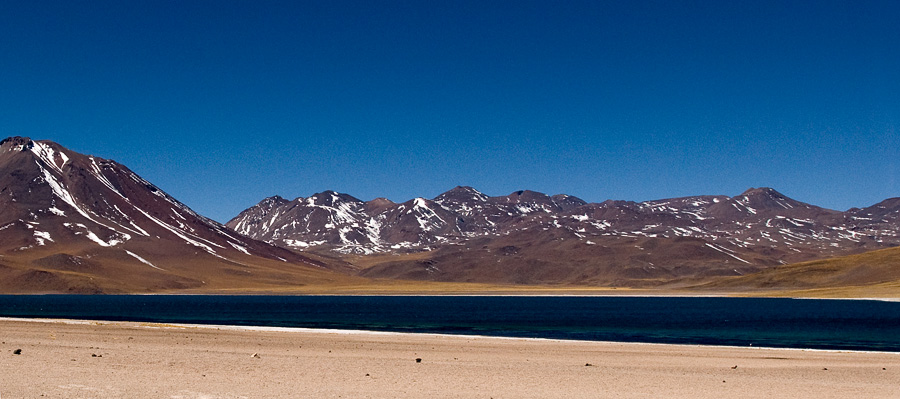
- Cordón de Puntas Negras seen from Laguna Miscanti with Cerro Miscanti in the foreground (left).

Highest point
- Elevation: 5,852 m (19,199 ft)
- Coordinates: 23°44′34″S 67°32′03″W

Geography
- Location: Chile
- Parent range: Andes

Geology
- Mountain type: Stratovolcanoes
- Last eruption: Unknown

Cordón de Puntas Negras is a 500 km^{2} (193 mi^{2}) volcanic chain located east of the Salar de Atacama in Chile's Antofagasta Region.

Cordón de Puntas Negras is constructed along the major Calama–Olacapato–El Toro fault and is 70 kilometres (43 mi) long. The 25 kilometres (16 mi) long volcanic chain intersects with the 13 kilometres (8.1 mi) long Cordón Chalviri volcanic chain. Both chains cover a surface area of 500 square kilometres (190 sq mi) and contain cones, vents, lava domes, lava flows and maars, including a lava dome and silicic flow with a surface area of 13 square kilometres (5.0 sq mi). Puntas Negras specifically covers an area of 400 square kilometres (150 sq mi) and is the highest summit in the chain and features a 500 metres (1,600 ft) wide crater and a 13 kilometres (8.1 mi) long pyroclastic flow. Puntas Negras runs from the Chiliques volcano on the north to volcán Puntas Negras (5,852 m (19,199 ft)) almost to the SE. The Puntas Negras Volcano forms the common endpoint of two chains of volcanoes in a V-shaped configuration. The southern leg of the V is called "Cordón Chalviri" whose other extreme is the Cerro Tuyajto, SW of Puntas Negras and at the same distance SE of the Miñiques volcano. Several small volcanic centres and lava flows are found here, including Aguas Calientes, Cerros Cenizas, Chinchilla and Laguna Escondida which have well preserved craters. The volcanic chain is associated with a topographic anomaly in the region, a property that other volcanoes in the area also have.

Rocks in the chain are andesite, basaltic andesite and dacite containing biotite, hornblende and pyroxene. Magmas from this volcanic chain have a calc-alkaline composition formed by partial melting of a mantle wedge, with research indicating a decrease in SiO_{2} concentration over time. In the Tuyajto group, past fumarolic activity has bleached the volcanic rocks in the summit region.

The basement beneath the chain is composed from Ordovician marine sediments that were later deformed by the Acadian orogeny. The 35 by 70 kilometres (22 mi × 43 mi) La Pacana caldera is buried beneath Puntas Negras. Both the 3.2 ± 0.3 Patao ignimbrite and the 2.4 ± 0.4 mya Pampa Chamaca or Tuyajto ignimbrite from La Pacana may have been erupted from beneath Puntas Negras. the Tuyajto ignimbrite is 530,000 ± 170,000 years old.

Biotites in andesitic lavas have been dated 0.7 ± 0.3 to 0.3 ± 0.2 million years ago. Volcan Puntas Negras has generated postglacial lava flows and a 13 square kilometres (5.0 sq mi) large lava dome west of Puntas Negras may be of Holocene age. An olivine basalt flow from the northern part of the chain extends over 10 kilometres (6.2 mi) towards Salar el Laco and may be of late Holocene age. The youngest volcanic centre appears to be located southeast of Laguna Escondida. Historical eruptions may have occurred in the Chalviri chain. A zone of anomalous electrical conductivity down to depths of 6 kilometres (3.7 mi) extends north to Lascar volcano. Cerro Overo at the southeastern end of Puntas Negras has been undergoing active deformation, with a previously observed pattern of subsidence before 2003–2005 switching to a pattern of inflation. Filling and emptying of a magma reservoir linked to Puntas Negras may be the cause for these deformation patterns. Future eruptions may threaten mining operations at El Laco and International Route CH-23.

The volcanic chain forms a water divide in the Andes, separating the Puna de Atacama from the basins Laguna Miscanti and Laguna Miniques. A catchment area of 320 square kilometres (120 sq mi) for the Laguna Miscanti lies in the Cordón de Puntas Negras. Puntas Negras has been affected by glaciation during the Pleistocene, with moraines reaching up to 4,400 metres (14,400 ft) altitude. Possibly, the entire chain was covered with glaciers, and certainly the southern part where several sets of moraines and glacial trimlines have been identified. Water from Cordón de Puntas Negras is a principal water source for Laguna Miscanti.

== See also ==
- List of volcanoes in Chile
- Acamarachi
- El Laco
- Miscanti
