= Lascar (volcano) =

Stratovolcano in the Central Volcanic Zone of the Andes

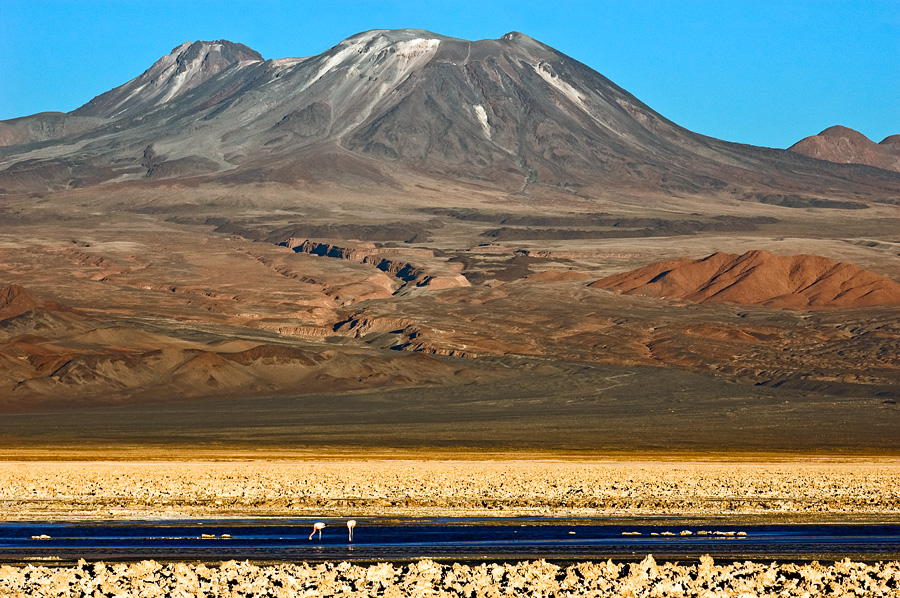
- The Lascar volcano, seen from the Chaxas lagoon on the Gran Salar. To the left, in the background, the Aguas Calientes volcano.

Highest point
- Elevation: 5,592 m (18,346 ft)
- Coordinates: 23°22′S 67°44′W

Geography
- Location within Chile
- Location: Northern Chile
- Parent range: Andes

Geology
- Mountain type: Stratovolcano
- Last eruption: December 10, 2022

Lascar is a stratovolcano in Chile within the Central Volcanic Zone of the Andes, a volcanic arc that spans Peru, Bolivia, Argentina and Chile. It is the most active volcano in the region, with records of eruptions going back to 1848. It is composed of two separate cones with several summit craters. The westernmost crater of the eastern cone is presently active. Volcanic activity is characterized by constant release of volcanic gas and occasional vulcanian eruptions.

Lascar has been active for at least 56,000 years; some argue for activity beginning 220,000 years ago. The first known activity occurred at the eastern cone and was characterized by lava flows, before shifting to the western cone where lava domes were emplaced. An eruption event known as Piedras Grandes was followed by the large Soncor eruption. A new western edifice was constructed on top of the Soncor vent, during the Holocene activity then shifted again to the eastern edifice and continues there to this day. The magma supplied to the volcano ultimately comes from the subduction of the Nazca Plate beneath the South America Plate. A number of other volcanoes are found in the region, such as Aguas Calientes, Cordon de Puntas Negras and the giant La Pacana caldera.

The volcano experienced at least three major eruptions throughout its history: One is the Soncor eruption about 26,450 ± 500 years ago, another in 7,250 BCE and the third in 1993. The first of these eruptions released 10–15 cubic kilometres (2.4–3.6 cu mi) of material and is known as the Soncor eruption. The largest eruption of Lascar known to recorded history occurred in April 1993 and caused ash fall as far away as Buenos Aires. Because Lascar is located in a remote area, it is monitored primarily by remote sensing. Explosive eruptions are the greatest hazard at Lascar.

== Etymology ==
The name originates from the Atacameño word láskar or lassi (English: tongue), thought to refer to the shape of the volcano. Other names for the volcano are Hlàscar, Hlascar, Ilascar, Illascar, Kar Las, Laskar, Toconado and Toconao.

== Human use ==
The new town of Talabre is 17 kilometres (11 mi) west of Lascar. As of 2012, it had a population of 50 inhabitants. Toconao and San Pedro de Atacama lie 34 kilometres (21 mi) and 68 kilometres (42 mi) from the volcano, respectively. As of 2017, stockbreeding and farming were the principal economic activities in Talabre. Chile Route 23 passes about 10 kilometres (6.2 mi) west of Lascar.

Lascar, like El Tatio, is a destination for volcano tourism. Unlike the neighbouring volcanoes Acamarachi, Licancabur and Quimal, there is no evidence of archeological sites on Lascar, possibly because of the volcanic activity. However, the inhabitants of the town of Camar consider Lascar a protective mountain spirit and in Susques (Argentina) it is believed that snow will fall if Lascar is steaming strongly. The local inhabitants might have associated Lascar with a ray god, illapu (Quechua) or illapa (Aymara). The inhabitants of Talabre give the volcano gifts, viewing it as their source of water.

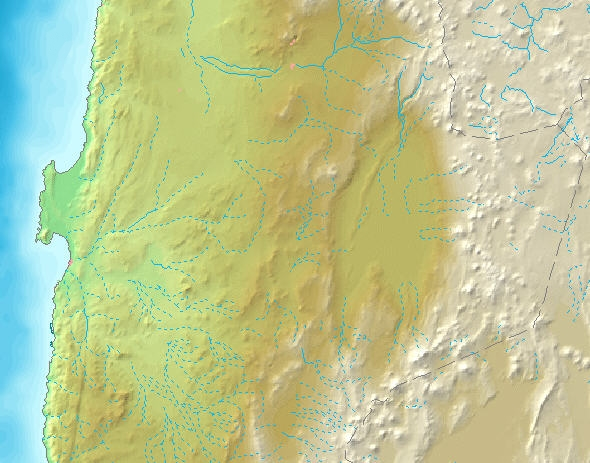
Towns in the region. Coordinates from GEOnet Names Server

== Geography and geological context ==
=== Regional setting ===
Volcanoes in the Andes occur in four separate regions: the Northern Volcanic Zone between 2°N and 5°S, the Central Volcanic Zone between 16°S and 28°S, the Southern Volcanic Zone between 33°S and 46°S, and the Austral Volcanic Zone, south of the Southern Volcanic Zone. These volcanic zones are separated by areas where recent volcanism is absent; one common theory is that the subduction processes responsible for volcanism form a subducting plate that is too shallow to trigger the formation of magma. This shallow subduction appears to be triggered by the Nazca Ridge and the Juan Fernandez Ridge; the areas where they subduct beneath the Peru-Chile Trench coincide with the limits of the Central Volcanic Zone. It is possible that when these ridges are subducted, the buoyancy they carry disrupts the subduction process and reduces the supply of water, which is important for the formation of melts.

Of these volcanic zones, the Central Volcanic Zone of which Lascar is a member of is the largest, covering parts of Peru, Bolivia, Argentina and Chile. The Central Volcanic Zone is located between two areas where subduction is shallower and volcanic activity is absent. In the Central Volcanic Zone, volcanism has been active for 120 million years, although it has undergone eastward migration during this time. Water released from the subducting plate triggers the formation of basaltic magmas that are then injected into the crust.

About 122 volcanoes with Holocene eruptions exist in the Andean Volcanic Belt, including Ojos del Salado which with a height of 6,887 metres (22,595 ft) is the highest volcano in the world. Many of these volcanoes are covered by snow and ice. A number of supervolcanoes exist in the Central Volcanic Zone, they are part of the Altiplano-Puna volcanic complex.

=== Local setting ===
Images of Lascar and neighbouring volcanoes

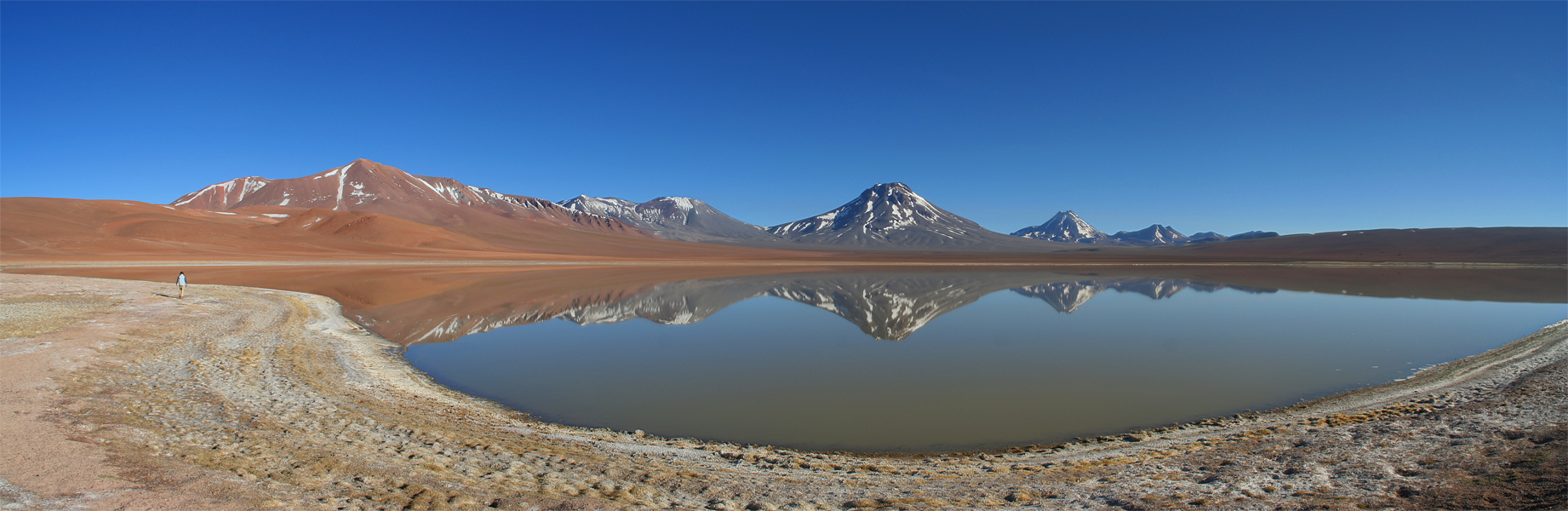
Aguas Calientes in the middle; Lascar on the left; Lake Lejía in foreground.

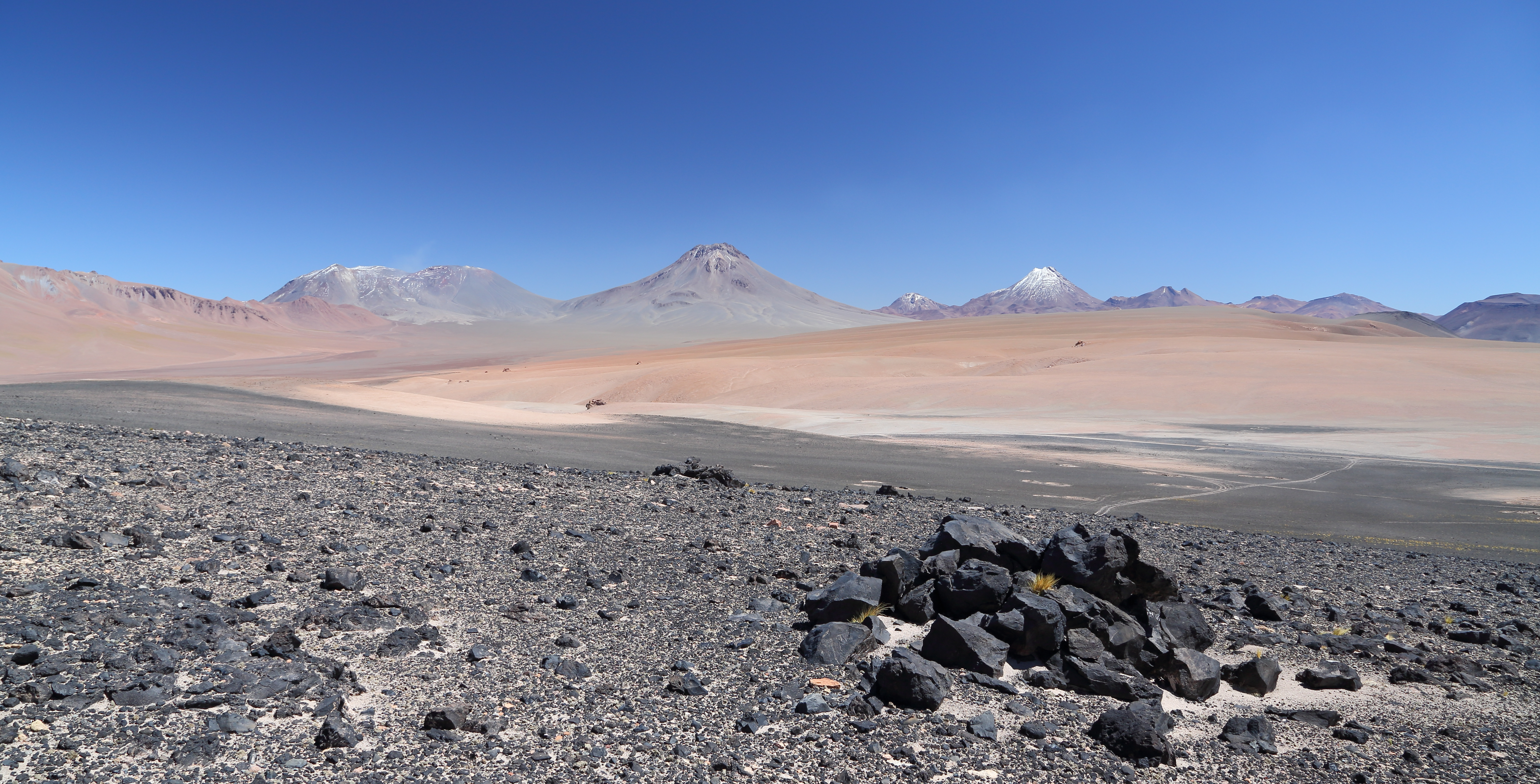
Lascar is just left of Aguas Calientes, which is the central cone. Acamarachi is the white cone on the right.

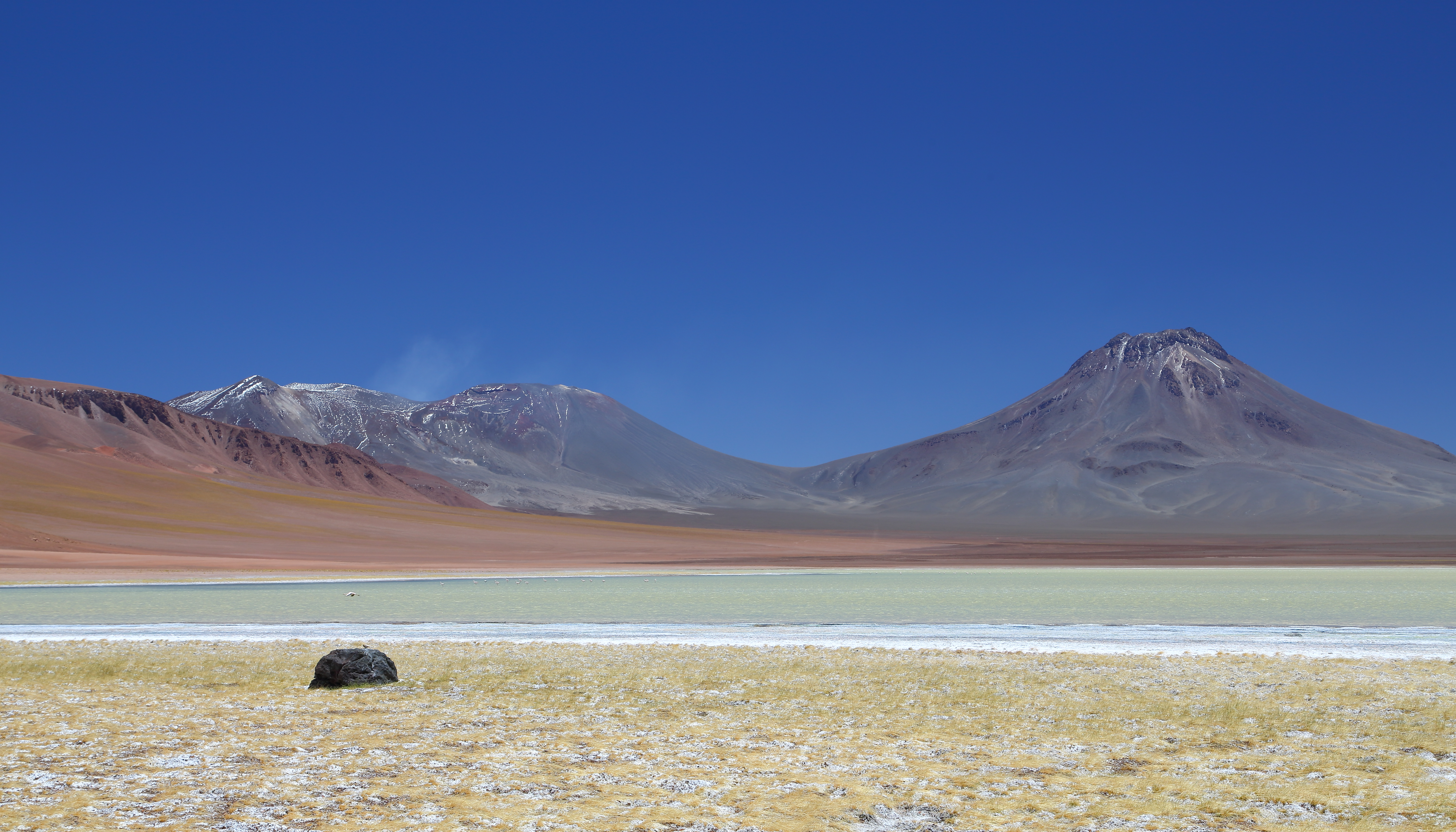
Lascar is on the centre-left, Aguas Calientes right.

The volcanism of Lascar relates to the subduction of the Nazca Plate beneath the South America Plate. The Central Andes contain many hundreds of volcanoes, extending over the countries of Argentina, Bolivia, Chile and Peru. In this remote territory, where eruptions are poorly recorded, many volcanoes are higher than 6,000 metres (20,000 ft). They are constructed on a crust that is between 50 and 70 kilometres (31 and 43 mi) thick. Volcanic centres include calderas and associated large ignimbrites, lava domes and stratovolcanoes; among the better-researched volcanoes are Galan, Nevados de Payachata, Ollague, Purico Complex, San Pedro–San Pablo, La Pacana, Tata Sabaya and Tumisa. Over 44 volcanoes in the region are considered potentially active, with a number of young volcanoes featuring fumarolic or hydrothermal activity. Guallatiri, for example, features fumarolic activity that is visible in satellite images. Also fumarolically active are: Sabancaya, El Misti, Ubinas, Tacora, Isluga, Irruputuncu, Olca, Ollague, San Pedro, Putana and Lastarria. The largest historical eruption occurred at Huaynaputina in 1600. Given the low population density around many of these volcanoes, there is often little information on their activity.

Lascar is located in the Antofagasta Region of Chile, and is 5,641 metres (18,507 ft), 5,592 metres (18,346 ft), or 5,450 metres (17,880 ft) high, according to different sources. With a surface area of 54 square kilometres (21 sq mi), the volcano has a volume of 15 cubic kilometres (3.6 cu mi). Geographically, the area of Lascar is located between the Altiplano and the Salar de Atacama 30 kilometres (19 mi) farther west; the terrain at Lascar dips in the direction of the Salar.

Lascar is located in the main volcanic arc, on the western margin of the Altiplano. The andesitic-dacitic Aguas Calientes is located 5 kilometres (3.1 mi) east of Lascar; it may have formed a lava flow close to the summit during the Holocene. Aguas Calientes is older than Lascar, and it might share a magma chamber. Miocene–Quaternary volcanic centres in the neighbourhood include Cerro Negro in the north, Acamarachi northeast, Tumisa southwest, and the Cordon de Puntas Negras in the south, which Lascar is sometimes considered to be part of. Tumisa, to the south of Lascar, was active between 2.5 and 0.4 million years ago, is composed of dacite and surrounded by pyroclastic flow deposits. East of Lascar lies the La Pacana caldera.

Cerro Opla, 20 kilometres (12 mi) west of Lascar, is a hill formed by Permian–Triassic granite. An area of increased electrical conductivity has been identified beneath Lascar and extends to some neighbouring volcanoes, reaching a depth of over 6 kilometres (3.7 mi) south of Lascar.

The 9-kilometre-long (5.6 mi) Quebrada de Chaile, the 17-kilometre-long (11 mi) Quebrada de Soncor and the 17-kilometre-long (11 mi) Quebrada de Talabre canyons run towards Salar de Atacama; they are 30–80 metres (98–262 ft) deep and 80–500 metres (260–1,640 ft) wide. These valleys were probably formed by erosion during glacial periods. The valleys drain the western, northern and southwestern slopes of Lascar. The southeastern slopes drain into Laguna Lejía which is close to the volcano, and the northwestern slope drains through the Quebrada de Morro Blanco.

Lascar is located atop of a ridge formed by the 5,293-metre-high (17,365 ft) Cerro Corona and 5,192-metre-high (17,034 ft) Cerro de Saltar lava domes, south and north of Lascar, respectively. Cerro Corona gets its name from a crown-shaped structure at its top. These domes cover a surface area of about 90 square kilometres (35 sq mi). These lava domes are about 5 million years old, and are composed of dacite and smaller amounts of pyroxene andesite, along with rhyolite and visible minerals including biotite and hornblende. An eruption 16,700 years ago from Corona deposited tephra containing biotite and quartz in Laguna Lejía and generated a rhyodacitic lava flow. Another debris flow from Corona spread towards Salar de Atacama.

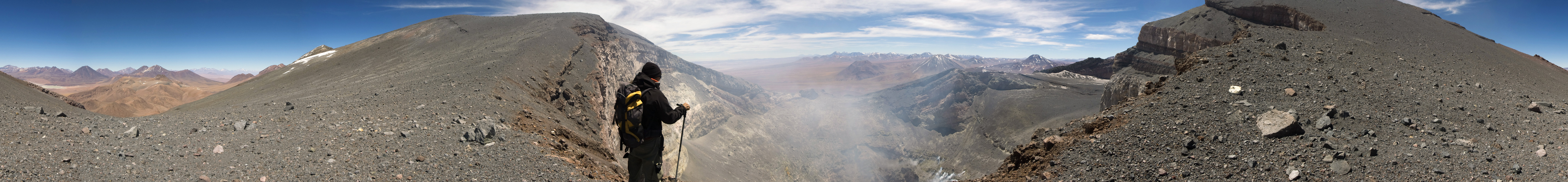
360° view at the crater's edge at 5,500 m (18,045 ft), including the steaming crater

== Geology ==
Lascar is a steep volcano formed by two irregularly shaped truncated cones that extend east–west, on a trend that includes Aguas Calientes. Six craters are located on the volcano, but sometimes only five craters are counted, in which case the central crater is considered to be the active one. The extinct western cone (also known as Apagado) is composed of layers of lava and pyroclastics. Its large crater is filled by another cone, which forms the highest summit of the Lascar volcano. Immediately east of it lies the eastern cone, which is contiguous with the western cone. The eastern cone (also known as Activo) is capped off with three distinct craters which are delimited by arcuate fractures. Measurements made from 1961 to 1997 determined that the eastern crater is 1 kilometre (0.62 mi) wide and 150–200 metres (490–660 ft) deep and thus the largest, the central crater is 600 metres (2,000 ft) wide and 100–200 metres (330–660 ft) deep, and the western crater is 800 metres (2,600 ft) wide and 200–300 metres (660–980 ft) deep, increasing to 400 metres (1,300 ft) depth in 2005–2006. The craters show evidence that activity has migrated westward. The westernmost of these three eastern craters is the currently active one, surrounded by rims that reach heights of 150 metres (490 ft). In 1985, a 150-by-150-metre (490 ft × 490 ft) hot spot in this crater was observed in satellite images. In the centre of the westernmost crater lies a smaller crater, with dimensions of 310 by 340 metres (1,020 ft × 1,120 ft) and a depth of 250 metres (820 ft). There are furrows formed by erosion, large blocks, deposits of sulfur and many fumaroles along the rim of the inner crater. The exact configuration is variable owing to ongoing volcanic activity.

The rims of the craters are partially buried by pyroclastic flows or cut by rockslides. Layers of lava and pyroclastics are discernible in the craters. These craters are not collapsed calderas, and there is no evidence of the deposits a large explosion would produce. Remnants of a previous edifice are visible in the craters; this older edifice constitutes the bulk of the eastern cone. There are traces of a collapse of the volcano towards the northeast, with an associated horseshoe-shaped scar.

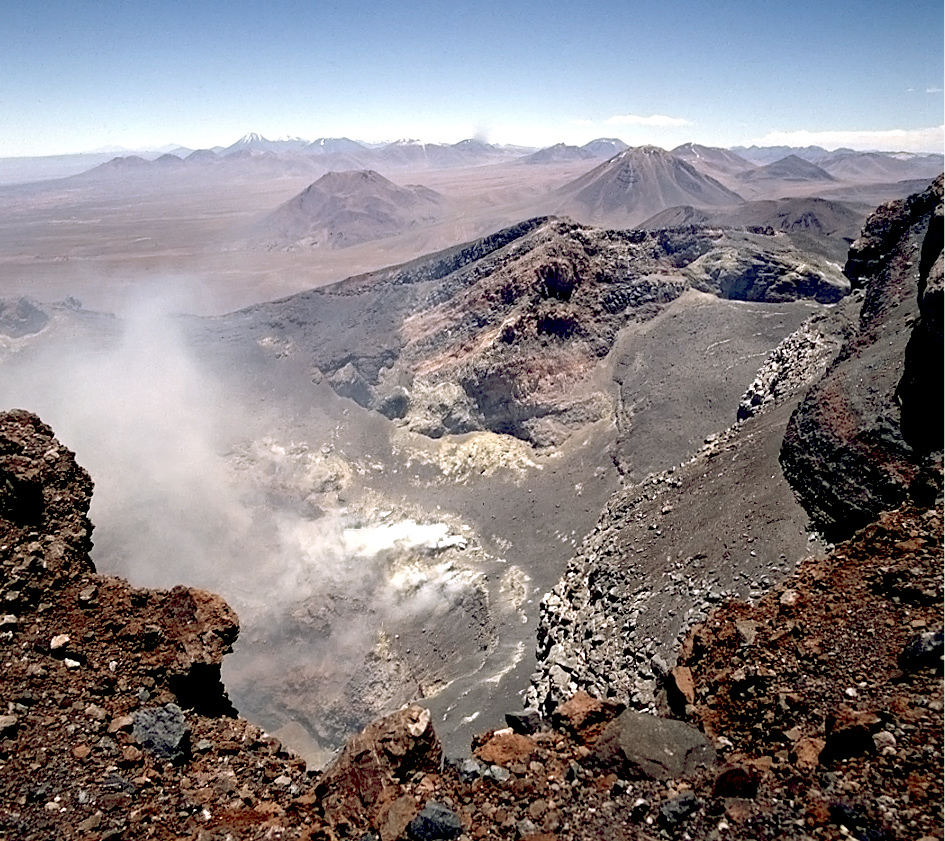
Closeup of crater

360-degree digital elevation model (DEM) animation of Lascar volcano, illustrating its overall topography and the truncated cones described in the text.

Images of the crater and topography

Large lava flows are noticeable on the flanks of the volcano, with a total of eight lava flows recognized. They extend from the summit craters, although none of them appear to be associated with the currently active crater. Flows from the first stage of Lascar's activity are exposed at its western foot, while lava flows are buried beneath pyroclastic material on the eastern flank. A 6-kilometre-long (3.7 mi) lava flow on the northern flank reaches almost to the village of Talabre. This lava flow is known as the Tumbres–Talabre lava flow; its margins are 10–40 metres (33–131 ft) high, and it features a central channel. The flow advanced just north of the head of Quebrada Talabre before passing over cliffs and entering it. Another lava flow on the southwest flank is known as the Capricorn Lava. This dacitic lava was erupted on Lascar at high altitude and has a blocky surface. It features well developed levees and a 10-metre-thick (33 ft) flow front. Its rocks have a pale gray-blue colour, and their composition resembles the Soncor flow, despite more mafic lavas and pyroclastics being erupted in the time period between the emplacement of the Soncor flow and the Capricorn Lava.

An early pyroclastic flow, the Saltar Flow, is exposed on the eastern flank. It was emplaced after the collapse of the oldest edifice, covering Aguas Calientes' western slopes. The flow deposit was later modified by glacial activity. The Soncor flow is found primarily on the western side of Lascar, with part of it also southeast of Lascar. On the western slope, it buries the even older Piedras Grandes flow, which crops out only at the margins of the Soncor flow. While the Piedras Grandes flow was formed by a glacier run that transported blocks with sizes of up to 8 metres (26 ft), Soncor was formed by a large eruption. The large eruption gave rise to a pyroclastic flow that extended 27 kilometres (17 mi) westward and contained breccia and various magmas. It was accompanied by a Plinian fall deposit. Finally, the andesitic pumice Tumbres flow is found on the northwest–west–southwestern slopes of Lascar.

The Quebrada Talabre cuts into the upper flanks of Lascar and eventually joins the Quebrada Soncor. Lahar deposits are found in adjacent valleys, suggesting that wetter periods had occurred during Lascar's activity. The Quebrada Talabre was scoured by pyroclastic flows during the 1993 eruption, exposing bedrock and Tertiary ignimbrites. Traces of glacial action are found on the older parts of Lascar at altitudes above 4,600 metres (15,100 ft) and include meltwater gorges, striated rock surfaces, and U-shaped valleys. Moraines are found at Tumisa down to an altitude of 4,850 metres (15,910 ft).

The volcano sits above a major local geological trend, the north–south Miscanti Line. Other volcanic centres are also located on this line, including the Corona and Saltar lava domes, and the Miscanti and Lejia volcanoes. The Miscanti Line dissects the Quaternary basement beneath Lascar, and it may be a hinge of a fold that is being propagated by faults. The formation of the first cone at Lascar may have been facilitated by the intersection between the Miscanti Line and another east–west lineament formed by Pliocene–Pleistocene tectonic compression of the region, and the lineament would have worked as an ascent path for magma. At least four alignments of volcanoes are recognized in the region.

=== Composition ===
Lascar rocks consist of andesite and dacite. These rocks have a composition mainly characterized as "two-pyroxene", (Note: Containing both clinopyroxene and orthopyroxene.) but the old Piedras Grandes and Soncor rocks contain hornblende. Other minerals include anhydrite, augite, plagioclase which is also the dominant phenocryst phase in Lascar rocks, apatite, ilmenite, magnetite, olivine, orthopyroxene, phyrrotite, quartz, rhyolite in the groundmass, and spinel in inclusions. Dacite has more plagioclase and rhyolite. Additional component minerals found at Lascar include anorthite, augite bordering on diopside, bronzite, fassaite, forsterite, hypersthene, pigeonite and more.

The rocks of Lascar belong to the calc-alkaline series. SiO_{2} concentrations range from 55.5 to 67.8% by weight, and the rocks have medium to large concentrations of potassium. The magmas are contaminated by the local crust, but not to the extent found in the Galan or Purico complex eruption products. The magma interacts with former salar deposits before ascending. The chemistry of Lascar's rocks is fairly similar to those of neighbouring Tumisa volcano.

Magma erupted by Lascar appears to form from the mixing of mafic and more evolved magmas; the 1993 eruption deposits contain bands of different rocks. Specifically, basaltic andesite magma is periodically injected into a magma chamber, where crystal fractionation and mixing processes take place, with their relative contributions varying depending on magma resupply rates. The average magma resupply rate is high, thus the magmas are relatively unevolved; presumably, if the supply of mafic magma is steady, the products are andesitic, otherwise dacite forms. This origin of Lascar magmas is reflected in the textures of rocks. Petrologic investigations indicate that at least three components give rise to Lascar's magmas, an upper crustal one, a mantle component and an enriched component that may come either from the lower crust or the downgoing slab. The overall magma supply rate of Lascar is 0.02–0.03 cubic metres per second (0.71–1.06 cu ft/s).

The magma chamber of Lascar appears to lie at depths of 10–17 kilometres (6.2–10.6 mi), although the lack of deformation of the edifice during the 1993 eruption indicates that it may be deeper, over 25–30 kilometres (16–19 mi) or even over 40 kilometres (25 mi) deep. Magma petrology implies that there is another reservoir at 6 kilometres (3.7 mi) depth. A large regional-scale structure, the Altiplano-Puna Magma Body, underlies Lascar. There appear to be two distinct chamber systems, an andesitic one that is responsible for the frequent andesite lava and pyroclastic flow activity, and a dacitic one that was involved in the Piedras Grandes and Soncor activities.

Temperatures of the magma chamber range from 890–970 °C (1,630–1,780 °F); the mafic magmas that are injected in the chamber are about 150–200 °C (270–360 °F) hotter than the extant andesite and dacite. The chamber may be surrounded by skarnic alteration. This alteration gives rise to wollastonite and pyroxene-containing skarn, depending on the distance from the magma chamber walls. Metasomatism does further affect rocks derived from magma chamber walls. The conditions at the magma chamber may be comparable to these under which epithermal mineral deposits form. The oxidation conditions in the magma chamber are favourable for the formation of sulfate, but unfavourable for the deposition of sulfide minerals.

A number of xenoliths occur in Lascar's rocks; a large amount of the phenocrysts are ultimately derived from them. Hornfels, skarn, and rocks that are part of Lascar's lava dome ridge are the source of these xenoliths. Minerals encountered in xenoliths include andradite, anhydrite, anorthite, apatite, biotite, calcite, diopside, fassaite, garnet, gypsum, ilmenite, magnetite, monazite, orthopyroxene, perovskite, plagioclase, prehnite, quartz, sphene, thorite, wilkeite, wollastonite and zircon. A number of such xenoliths formed from carbonate rocks that were influenced by magma of Lascar and of other volcanoes such as Tumisa.

=== Gas emissions ===
Lascar emits plumes of gas and white clouds of condensed water vapor, mostly through many hundreds of fumarolic vents, which are chiefly located in the active crater. The temperatures range between 40–150 °C (104–302 °F); in December 2002, two fumaroles had temperatures exceeding 295 °C (563 °F). Total flux is estimated to be 1,312–18,469 kilograms per second (2,890–40,720 lb/s), and occurs even between eruptions. The vents are active for years. Their positions in the crater is influenced by ring-shaped fractures in the crater floor.

There are high-temperature fumaroles (temperatures equal to or exceeding 150 °C (302 °F)) and low-temperature fumaroles (temperatures of less than 82 °C (180 °F)), with noticeable chemical differences between the two; the latter tend to emit far more water than carbon dioxide. The fumaroles also release carbon monoxide, hydrogen, hydrogen chloride, hydrogen sulfide, and smaller amounts of helium. Hydrocarbons and other organic compounds are also found in the low-temperature fumaroles. Trace elements include arsenic, boron and titanium, with smaller amounts of barium, chromium, copper, lead, strontium and zinc. The fumarole gases react with surrounding rocks, forming precipitates and altered rocks.

Lascar is an important source of chalcophile elements in northern Chile. Release rates of SO_{2} amounted to 27 tonnes per day (0.31 kg/s) in 1989, and 28 tonnes per day (0.32 kg/s) in 2003. Overall sulfur output ranges between 200 and 2,300 tonnes per day (2.3 and 26.6 kg/s). This corresponds to about 1% of global volcanic sulfur emissions, and is comparable to Kilauea and Villarica. Lascar was a substantial source of sulfur dioxide for the atmosphere around 30° south, reaching a proportion of 20–40% the sulfur over South America and still 10–20% over the South Indian Ocean. In 2005, Lascar was the third-largest source of volcanic sulfur dioxide in the world among continuously active volcanoes, behind Etna in Italy and Bagana in Papua-New Guinea. Since 2014, however, the Peruvian volcanoes Sabancaya and Ubinas have become the largest source of tropospheric sulfur dioxide from the Central Volcanic Zone. There are temporal variations in the output: after a decrease in 2009, sulfur output increased in 2012, probably as a consequence of the arrival of new magma at depth. There is no clear association between periods of degassing and eruptions. Sulfur is released from areas all over the cone, resulting in a noticeable sulfur smell.

Hydrogen chloride and hydrogen fluoride are also released in large amounts, with estimates made in 2003–2004 indicating a mass flux of 340,000,000 kilograms per year (11 kg/s) and 150,000,000 kilograms per year (4.8 kg/s) respectively. They correspond to about 2 and 5%, respectively, of the global volcanic flux of these compounds. Finally, Lascar is vigorous producer of sulfate dust particles, which are released at a rate of about 100,000 trillion particles per second.

Minor emissions
Element	Output
Antimony	0.0029 kilograms per day (0.0064 lb/d)
Arsenic	0.324 kilograms per day (0.71 lb/d)
Barium	0.054 kilograms per day (0.12 lb/d)
Bismuth	0.0036 kilograms per day (0.0079 lb/d)
Boron	0.141 kilograms per day (0.31 lb/d)
Cadmium	0.00043 kilograms per day (0.00095 lb/d)
Cesium	0.0012 kilograms per day (0.0026 lb/d)
Chromium	0.046 kilograms per day (0.10 lb/d)
Copper	0.051 kilograms per day (0.11 lb/d)
Indium	0.00012 kilograms per day (0.00026 lb/d)
Lead	0.019 kilograms per day (0.042 lb/d)
Lithium	0.0038 kilograms per day (0.0084 lb/d)
Molybdenum	0.004 kilograms per day (0.0088 lb/d)
Rubidium	0.0075 kilograms per day (0.017 lb/d)
Selenium	0.0042 kilograms per day (0.0093 lb/d)
Tellurium	0.0032 kilograms per day (0.0071 lb/d)
Thallium	0.0048 kilograms per day (0.011 lb/d)
Tin	0.014 kilograms per day (0.031 lb/d)
Tungsten	0.00084 kilograms per day (0.0019 lb/d)
Zinc	0.088 kilograms per day (0.19 lb/d)

Gases are partly supplied from shallow magma; the volume of magma erupted is too small to contain all the exhalations. The release of gas by the magma is favoured by strong temperature contrasts between incoming magma and the magma chamber, and processes occurring during the mixing may explain the high emission of sulfur dioxide by Lascar. The presence of argon and nitrogen in low-temperature fumaroles indicates that air is involved in their formation, although a portion of each of these two gases is non-atmospheric.

Sulfur and chlorine may be derived from the crust, evaporites such as these found at Salar de Atacama, subducted lithosphere or the mantle. Carbon in the gases may come from skarn assimilation. Sulfur isotope data support the notion that evaporite deposits contribute part of Lascar's sulfur. Water appears to be in part magmatic and in part precipitation-derived. The high concentrations of halogens are typical for subduction-associated volcanoes; the halogens are supplied to the volcanoes through subduction-induced processes that act on the crust and the subducting plate.

The heat output of Lascar is about 75–765 megawatts (71,000–725,000 BTU/s) during regular activity, but has been estimated to be as high as 2.5 gigawatts (2,400,000 BTU/s). Electrical conductivity data suggest that a hydrothermal system exists beneath Lascar, but the existence of such a system has been questioned.

=== Basement ===
Lascar rests atop the Atana ignimbrite, a rhyodacitic sheet which was erupted by La Pacana caldera 4.5–3.7 million years ago. The Pampa Chamaca and Tuyajto ignimbrites are somewhat younger, 2.6–2.2 million and less than 1 million years respectively. These ignimbrites form a 3° steep slope in the area. Other basement rocks are the sandstone-containing marine Devonian–Carboniferous Lila formation, the red-orange Permian Cas formation containing volcanic rocks and granites, as well as the volcanic Permian–Triassic Peine formation and Cerro Negro strata, which also contain intruded rocks and lake sediments. These formations are not visible in the Lascar area, but they crop out close to the Salar de Atacama. Tertiary sediment and volcanic rocks can also be found. The presence of Mesozoic limestone is indicated by xenoliths in Lascar's lavas; the only place they crop out farther east is in Argentina. This limestone formation has been identified as the Yacoraite formation. Later deposits include the Cenozoic sedimentary Quepe strata. Landforms over this basement include ignimbrites, lava domes, and stratovolcanoes. Exposures of the basement are often delimited by faults.

== Eruptive history ==
Lascar is one of the three most active volcanoes in the Andean Central Volcanic Zone (the other two are the Peruvian volcanoes Sabancaya and Ubinas) and a steady pattern of eruptive activity has persisted for centuries. The volcano persistently features a tall plume of water and sulfur dioxide. Most present-day activity consists of the release of fumarolic gas with additional vulcanian activity that generates eruption columns several kilometres high, typically every three or two years and half of the time during austral spring as well as active deformation of the three active craters observed in interferometric synthetic-aperture radar. The long-term magma supply rate of Lascar is about 0.08 cubic kilometres per millennium (80,000 m^{3}/a), the volcano has produced about 30–40 cubic kilometres (7.2–9.6 cu mi) of rock.

=== Early activity ===
The oldest volcanic activity at Lascar occurred between 220,000 and less than 50,000 years ago. Activity has alternated between the eastern and western part of the volcano during its history. The eastern edifice formed first (stage I), erupting andesite containing pyroxene, and eventually forming the Chaile and Saltar pyroclastic flows. The oldest mafic andesites are less than 43,000 years old, while the Chaile and Saltar pyroclastic flows erupted over 26,500 years ago. An alternative dating scheme considers Chaile to be 47,000 ± 16,000 years old and Saltar 167,000 ± 9,000 years old.

Lava flows less than 50 metres (160 ft) thick issued from the stage I cone and reached lengths of 16 kilometres (9.9 mi). They occur beneath altitudes of 4,100 metres (13,500 ft), their vents buried by later activity. The lavas from stage I are mostly exposed north and west of Lascar. The Chaile flows are actually formed by two separate units and are found on the southwest flanks of the volcano, up to a distance of 6 kilometres (3.7 mi). They reach thicknesses of 5 metres (16 ft) in the upper unit and 30 metres (98 ft) in the lower one. The Saltar flow reached widths of 0.7–1.3 kilometres (0.43–0.81 mi) and thicknesses of 5–20 metres (16–66 ft), increasing to 35 metres (115 ft) where the flow entered valleys. At least nine units form the Saltar deposit, with the northern flows displaying flow welding. These deposits have volumes of 0.1 cubic kilometres (0.024 cu mi) and probably formed when an explosive eruption took place in a lava lake. After the end of stage I, a period of glacial erosion occurred prior to new activity, which created furrows in the Saltar flow. Imprecise argon–argon dating on younger andesites has yielded dates of 14,000 ± 18,000 and 17,000 ± 22,000 years.

Later volcanic activity buried this edifice beneath thin pyroclastic flows. The western edifice generated a complex of lava domes (stage II), which was probably surrounded by a horseshoe-shaped crater open to the west. Possibly, the magma chamber of stage I had almost solidified when the injection of basaltic magma at depths of over 5 kilometres (3.1 mi) triggered a remelting. Andesite-rhyodacite intrusions occurred beneath the volcano, some of which were still hot when the Soncor eruption tore them out of the ground. An ice cap formed over Lascar at that time, feeding two glaciers that extended northeast and southeast away from the volcano.

=== Piedras Grandes unit ===
The stage II activity was accompanied by the eruption of block and ash flows consisting of andesite, and an eruption whose deposits include blocks with sizes of 15 metres (49 ft). This unit, formed during stage II, is known as Piedras Grandes,and is exposed on the western slopes below about 4,900 metres (16,100 ft) altitude. The unit is about 2 kilometres (1.2 mi) wide and consists of large blocks encased in ash. The composition of the Piedras Grandes unit is andesite containing amphibole, basaltic andesite and hornblende. The Piedras Grandes unit is over 26,500 years old, possibly between 63,000 and 100,000 years old. Temperatures have been estimated to be 740–1,060 °C (1,360–1,940 °F) for the andesite and 1,130–1,220 °C (2,070–2,230 °F) for the basaltic andesite. The magmas were formed from a remelted proto-pluton that had been heated and resupplied with volatiles by mafic magmas.

The lava domes interacted with glaciers, resulting in the formation of a glacier run whose deposits are found as far as 10 kilometres (6.2 mi) from the volcano. Blocks with sizes of up to 15 metres (49 ft) were transported by this flow. An alternative theory posits that the Piedras Grandes unit formed when an ice cap on Lascar interacted with a block and ash flow erupted by Aguas Calientes.

=== Soncor eruption ===
A major Plinian eruption occurred 26,450 ± 500 years ago, releasing 10–15 cubic kilometres (2.4–3.6 cu mi) of ejecta, both volcanic ash and pyroclastic flows. The deposits left contain both andesite and dacite, with phenocrysts consisting of apatite, augite, biotite, iron-titanium oxides, orthopyroxene and plagioclase in a rhyolite matrix. The Plinian deposit has a colour ranging from white to creamy. Like the Piedras Grandes rocks, they tend towards high potassium quantities, and resemble other volcanic rocks of Lascar and the Central Andes in composition. The deposits are formed by a Plinian fallout deposit and an ignimbrite rich in lithics. This Plinian deposit reaches thicknesses of 22 metres (72 ft) and fell from a 22-to-30-kilometre-high (14 to 19 mi) eruption column.

The Soncor ignimbrite extended as much as 27 kilometres (17 mi) west from the volcano, 10 kilometres (6.2 mi) north and 15 kilometres (9.3 mi) south. It is white, heterogeneous and mostly featureless with only weak sorting, but features a noticeable compositional zonation. The ignimbrite features three facies, one rich in breccia, another rich in pumice, and a normal ignimbrite.

Ignimbrite was channeled to the Salar de Atacama by the Quebrada de Chaile, Quebrada de Soncor and Quebrada de Talabre canyons and some smaller valleys, northeastwards by the Quebrada de Morro Blanco and as far as 11 kilometres (6.8 mi) southeastwards over the Pampa Leija area. In these valleys, the ignimbrite can be as much as 60 metres (200 ft) thick. Pumices are encased in the ignimbrite as lenses and levees and are also found in the terrain above the canyons. Estimated temperatures decreased from 800–900 °C (1,470–1,650 °F) at the vent to 580–600 °C (1,076–1,112 °F) farther down the flows. At the time of emplacement, the ignimbrite was still 200–300 °C (392–572 °F). Magma temperatures have been estimated at 900–1,000 °C (1,650–1,830 °F). The Soncor fallout deposit contains a basal gravelly layer and several layers of andesitic and dacitic pumice which also contain lithics. The total volume of the Soncor eruption products has been estimated to be either 5.6 cubic kilometres (1.3 cu mi) dense rock equivalent or 10 cubic kilometres (2.4 cu mi) net volume, both minimum estimates. Lithic rocks derived both from the pre-Soncor volcano and the basement are also represented.

The magma erupted was generated in a magma chamber starting from andesite, which underwent complex petrogenetic processes. This magma chamber was located at a floor depth of 5–6 kilometres (3.1–3.7 mi) (older estimate 12–22 kilometres (7.5–13.7 mi)) and probably had a complex shape, given certain chemical properties of the Soncor rocks. At the time preceding the eruption, the magma chamber had a thermal stratification; injections of mafic magmas had heated the magma chamber and induced convection.

A volatile phase containing chlorine formed inside the magma chamber and quickly removed most sulfur from the magma. This sulfur extraction was facilitated by the high oxygen content of the magma, which allowed the formation of sulfur dioxide. Water is a principal volatile involved in the processes of Plinian eruptions; the water content of the Soncor and Piedras Grandes magmas was about 4–5%. The Soncor magmas were associated with a volatile phase that underwent extensive interaction with the future eruption products.

The previous volcanic edifice was destroyed by this eruption, which may have formed a caldera. The vent was no wider than 2 kilometres (1.2 mi), as it is completely hidden beneath the western cone. Such a vent or caldera is substantially smaller than the volume of rocks erupted, a discrepancy that is also evident in the 1932 eruption of Quizapu. The Soncor magma chamber may have been too deep to collapse when it was emptied, explaining why no significant caldera was formed.

The Soncor deposit was subsequently affected by glaciation and the stage I edifice by a debris avalanche, which was radiocarbon dated at 22,310 +2,700/−2000 years ago in the Quebrada de Chaile. This debris avalanche is 50 metres (160 ft) thick and 25 kilometres (16 mi) long. The Capricorn Lava overlies the Soncor deposits.

=== Post-Soncor activity ===
Later, a new stratovolcano grew over the Soncor vent. This volcano was formed by andesite-dacite lava flows (stage III) and scoria. Lava flows from this stage have thicknesses of 20–60 metres (66–197 ft) and lengths reaching 5 kilometres (3.1 mi). It has a volume of 5–6 cubic kilometres (1.2–1.4 cu mi). The growth of this volcano was preceded by a period of erosion between 20,800–20,100 and 12,500 years ago, coincident with the Lake Minchin humid period. Glaciers in the region reached their maximum size at that time. The deposits left by this erosional period contain no clear evidence of stage III activity; indeed Lascar was probably inactive between 14,000 and 10,500 years ago. However, an eruption of the Cerro Corona lava dome occurred during this period, and activity of stage III did not commence earlier than 22,300 years ago.

The Tumbres eruption occurred around 7250 BCE, commencing with the eruption of pumice falls that reach thicknesses of less than 1.2 metres (3 ft 11 in). Afterwards, up to four different units of pyroclastic flows, each 1–10 metres (3.3–32.8 ft) thick, formed deposits up to 10 kilometres (6.2 mi) long. At the end of the eruption, a 1.5-kilometre-wide (0.93 mi) caldera and the two western craters formed. The deposits left by this eruption contain basaltic andesite-andesite and were subject to agglutination and welding. Originally considered part of stage III, it was more recently attributed to stage IV given the considerable (6,000 years) temporal gap between the Tumbres eruption and stage III volcanism, and the geochemistry of the rocks. The Manquez agglutinate above the Tumbres deposits was formed either by the Tumbres eruption or by a subsequent stage; a pyroclastic cone in the western crater may be associated with this agglutinate.

Activity subsequently shifted to the eastern edifice. Around 5150 ± 1250 BCE, as obtained by surface exposure dating, the Tumbres-Talabre lava flow was erupted from the eastern crater. This flow extends 8 kilometres (5.0 mi) northwest and is 20–30 metres (66–98 ft) thick. The Tumbres-Talabre flow was originally considered to be of late-19th-century age. It probably formed when one of the craters filled with andesitic lava to the point of overflow. This eruption was the last effusive eruption of Lascar, when later lava domes are excluded. The three eastern summit craters formed at the time when the Tumbres-Talabre flow erupted in the remains of the stage I cone. This edifice is the currently active one, with the deepest of its three summit craters being active.

=== Historical activity ===
Lascar has erupted about thirty times since the 19th century. Written reports of volcanic activity exist since the 16th century, when the Spaniards arrived in the region, though few records exist from before 1848. Volcanic activity recorded after 1848 consists chiefly of fumarolic emissions and occasional explosive activity. Recorded eruptions occurred in 1858, 1875, 1883–1885, 1898–1900(?) and 1902, ranging from a volcanic explosivity index (VEI) of 0 to VEI 2. The 1933 eruption was seen as far away as Chuquicamata. Another series of eruptions occurred between November 1951 and January 1952; one eruption is recorded from 1940. Eruptions were observed in March 1960, which were accompanied by earthquakes felt in Toconao, as well as in September 1964 when ash fell in Socaire. Yet another eruption sequence occurred between 1959 and 1969. Eruptions in 1972 and 1974 are uncertain. For some eruptions, including the January 1854 eruption, it is not clear whether they occurred at Lascar or Aguas Calientes, and some early reports of volcanic activity at Aguas Calientes probably refer to Lascar.

In 1984, Lascar awakened to new activity; satellite images noted the presence of hot spots on the volcano. Landsat images taken during this time indicate that a lava lake may have existed in the central crater, generating a plume of volcanic gases and, in September 1986, a vulcanian eruption happened and dropped ash in Salta, Argentina. This eruption was first noticed when ash fell on Salta, and was accompanied by anomalies in the heat emission from the volcano recorded by satellite. The eruption was also observed by geologists in Toconao, where the explosion was violent enough to wake up people who were sleeping. Observers noted the formation of a cauliflower-shaped cloud that eventually developed into a mushroom cloud with a maximum height of 9.4 kilometres (5.8 mi) above the volcano. The eruption itself lasted only about five minutes and consisted of two pulses. Ash fall in Salta occurred about one hour after the eruption. This eruption was the most significant of the previous two decades, having a VEI of 3. Preceding historical eruptions did not exceed 2.

A 200-metre-wide (660 ft) and 50-metre-high (160 ft) lava dome formed in early 1989. This dome began to shrink in October 1989, and in December 1989, white clouds rose 2 kilometres (1.2 mi) above Lascar's crater. On 20 February 1990, an eruption column rose 8–14 kilometres (5.0–8.7 mi) above the crater, resulting in ash fall over 100 kilometres (62 mi) away from the volcano. In March 1990, the lava dome had a temperature of 100–200 °C (212–392 °F), with some parts exceeding 900 °C (1,650 °F). Lava bombs with diameters of up to 1.5 metres (4 ft 11 in) were hurled as far as 4 kilometres (2.5 mi) from the crater, presumably as a consequence of the lava dome exploding. Some of the material came from the conduit walls. The lava dome had disappeared, but in early 1992, another lava dome formed, eventually reaching a size of 180–190 metres (590–620 ft) width and 40 metres (130 ft) height, and was accompanied by explosions. It probably started shrinking in April 1992, although the shrinkage was directly visible only in November. Small explosions accompanied the shrinkage until, by March 1993, the dome had disappeared again.

An alternating cycle of fumarolic activity, an accumulation of fumarolic gases in the conduit and lava dome, and explosive activity followed by renewed fumarolic activity have characterized Lascar's activity since 1984. Explosive activity presumably occurs when gases can no longer escape. This occurs because as the magma loses its gas content, the number of pores in it, and thus its permeability to gas, decreases. Further, fractures permitting gas passage are obstructed when the magma contracts. Most of the time, numerous fumaroles within the crater form a plume that reaches an altitude of 1,000 metres (3,300 ft). During minor explosive eruptions, eruption columns reach heights of up to 5,000 metres (16,000 ft). The temperatures of the lava dome can reach 148–367 °C (298–693 °F). This cycle ended after 1993, probably because the April 1993 eruption modified the conditions in the volcanic system. Alternatively, the cycle may have continued, to reach another lava dome collapse stage in early 2003. While eruptions before 1993 had always been preceded by a reduction in heat radiated from the volcano, such a reduction in 1999–2000 did not lead to an eruption, and when an eruption took place in July 2000, it was preceded by only a brief drop in heat radiation.

=== 1993 eruption ===
Vulcanian explosions started on 18 April 1993, and on 19–20 April 1993, a major eruption occurred. After a prelude phreatic eruption around 14:30 on 18 April, the eruption commenced with two explosions at 6:28 and 9:20 local time on the 19 April, forming eruption columns 10 kilometres (6.2 mi) high. Another explosion at 13:02 sent a column 8.5 kilometres (5.3 mi) high. At least ten different pulses were observed, generating columns of various heights and forming mushroom clouds. The strongest pulse occurred on 20 April between 6:28 and 9:20 and sent flows towards the northwest. This pulse generated an eruption column 23 kilometres (14 mi) high. The total mass flux of the eruption was about 10,000,000–100,000,000 kilograms per second (860,000,000–8.64×10^{9} t/d), comparable to the 1982 eruption of El Chichon. The lava dome in the crater was destroyed and was probably the source of the lava bombs that were thrown as far as 4 kilometres (2.5 mi) away from the vent; some of these bombs had diameters of 2 metres (6 ft 7 in) and left large impact craters.

The eruption columns underwent several collapses, creating pyroclastic flows at least seven to nine times. The first pyroclastic flow was observed around 10:12 on 19 April. Other flows occurred at 12:05, after 13:37, 17:25, 21:35–21:48, 23:40–23:50 and on 20 April at 9:20. After being discharged through gaps in the crater rim, pyroclastic flows on the northwestern and the eastern sides reached lengths of 8.5 kilometres (5.3 mi), and 4 kilometres (2.5 mi) on the southern side. These flows reached a thickness of about 5–10 metres (16–33 ft) and advanced through the Quebrada de Talabre, which had intercepted the flows on the northern flank. On the southeastern flank, the pyroclastic flows formed a fan extending several hundred metres into Pampa Leija. Pyroclastic flows reached a speed of 55 metres per second (180 ft/s), and themselves generated ash surges that partly rose above the flows. Hot pyroclastic flows on the southeastern flank covered a surface area of 13–18.5 kilometres (8.1–11.5 mi). The southern flank flows at first proceeded along a gully before spreading out. The total area covered by the flows is about 14.2 square kilometres (5.5 sq mi) on the northern slopes (Tumbres fan) and 4.3 square kilometres (1.7 sq mi) on the southern slopes (Lejia fan). The flows left lobate structures that form a stacked deposit, which shows such structures as levees and finger-like toes. The speed of these flows has been estimated at 100–700 kilometres per hour (62–435 mph).

About 30% of these flows were formed by ash and 70% by blocks, with larger fragments accumulating on the margins of each flow deposit. The pyroclastic flow deposits contain lithics from several sources, as well as pumice. Pumice mostly accumulated on the surface of the flows, and individual stones are up to 30 centimetres (12 in) wide. Lithic blocks are up to 3 metres (9.8 ft) thick. The total volume of these pyroclastic flows is about 0.06 cubic kilometres (0.014 cu mi) and they are the only pyroclastic flows emplaced by Lascar during historical time.

There is a pronounced morphology characterized by a channel upslope and snout-like toes downslope. Flow surfaces display pronounced fractures with a V profile, which developed a year after the eruption. The pyroclastic flow surfaces subsided after the eruption, with pulses of faster subsidence coinciding with the 1995 Antofagasta earthquake and the 2007 Tocopilla earthquake. The flows were strongly erosive, extracting rocks and material from the bedrock, even far away from the vent. Noticeable erosion occurred in the areas over which pyroclastic flows had passed, forming abrasion surfaces and removing loose detritus from the ground.

These flows took a long time to cool down; in the Quebrada Tumbres, they had not cooled down completely by December 1993. Additional surfaces were covered by ash cloud surges, reaching thicknesses of no more than 5 centimetres (2.0 in) on the sides of the pyroclastic flows. In some parts of the edifice, ejecta formed layers thick enough to undergo landsliding. The deposits and small structures, such as levees and lobes, were conserved by the dry climate in the region.

The ash from the volcano was carried by western wind towards Argentina and the Atlantic Ocean. Ash fall in Tucuman and Santiago del Estero was intense enough that traffic ground to a halt, and air travel was impacted internationally. Authorities closed schools in Argentine provinces close to the volcano and recommended that people not go out without masks. Tephra fall from this eruption was recorded in Argentina, including in Buenos Aires, 1,500 kilometres (930 mi) away, and in Brazil, Paraguay, and Uruguay. Ash from this eruption was identified in ice cores from Illimani while sulfates reportedly appeared in ice taken from the Arctic and Antarctica. Over 0.1 millimetres (0.0039 in) of ash fell over a surface area of over 850,000 square kilometres (330,000 sq mi). Larger particles fell closer to the volcano, while smaller particles were carried farther. Volcanic ash deposited close to the volcano was partially remobilized by winds a few days after the eruption.

This eruption was the most significant eruption of Lascar in the last 9,000 years, with a volcanic explosivity index of 4 and a duration of 32 hours, and one of the most significant volcanic eruptions in the recent history of Chile. It caused noticeable changes in the morphology of the volcano, including the formation of a new fracture along the summit craters; however, the summit craters themselves were not heavily altered apart from the formation of a trench across the three craters that runs in west–east direction. The whole volcano did not deform during the eruption sequence. The eruption released about 400,000 tonnes (390,000 long tons; 440,000 short tons) of sulfur dioxide, about half the quantity released by the 1980 eruption of Mount St. Helens, and was sufficient to cause a noticeable increase in atmospheric opacity. The Quebrada Tumbre was blocked, and its water chemistry noticeably altered, by the eruption. About 900,000 tonnes (890,000 long tons; 990,000 short tons) of gypsum was deposited in the drainages around the volcano, forming a significant supply of sulfur in the region.

The people of Talabre were evacuated during the eruption to Toconao, although some ignored evacuation orders. There were no injuries or fatalities, however the eruption did lead to water pollution in the region, including increases in cadmium, copper and lead concentrations in local rivers. An increase of mercury from the eruption was detected as far as Laguna del Plata, Argentina. The 1993 eruption was followed by a significant increase in the fluorine content of plants covered by the ash. Regulatory limits on concentrations of other elements in water were also exceeded, although only temporarily.

=== Post-1993 activity ===
The eruption record at Lascar becomes more irregular after the 1993 eruption. During April 1993, a new lava dome formed in the crater. It was larger than preceding lava domes, reaching a diameter of 380 metres (1,250 ft). It started to shrink again by May. On 17 December 1993, another explosion created an eruption column 8–10 kilometres (5.0–6.2 mi) high. By 28 December, the dome had subsided completely in the centre, leaving only its margins. Subsequently, a number of fumaroles were active around the crater. Explosive eruptions, accompanied by the formation of eruption columns reaching heights of several kilometres, sometimes leading to ash fall in Jujuy, Argentina, occurred on 27 February 1994; in July 1994, November 1994, and March 1995; and on 10 May, 20 July and 18 October 1996. During the July 1995 eruption, subsidence was noted on satellite images of the inside of the central crater. The collapse structures during this activity were larger than those noted in previous activity, possibly because the April 1993 eruption had emptied part of the system. Otherwise, activity between 1993 and 2000 was not accompanied by deformation of the edifice.

An eruption in July 2000 was seen from Chuquicamata, and the noise was audible as far as San Antonio de los Cobres, 160 kilometres (99 mi) away. The eruption lasted for two hours and formed a 10–11-kilometre-high (6.2–6.8 mi) eruption column. An ash plume was carried 660 kilometres (410 mi) east. Three eruptions in October 2002 formed ash columns that rose 500–2,500 metres (1,600–8,200 ft), while an explosion in December 2003 created a column 400–500 metres (1,300–1,600 ft) high. No lava domes were recorded in the crater during that period.

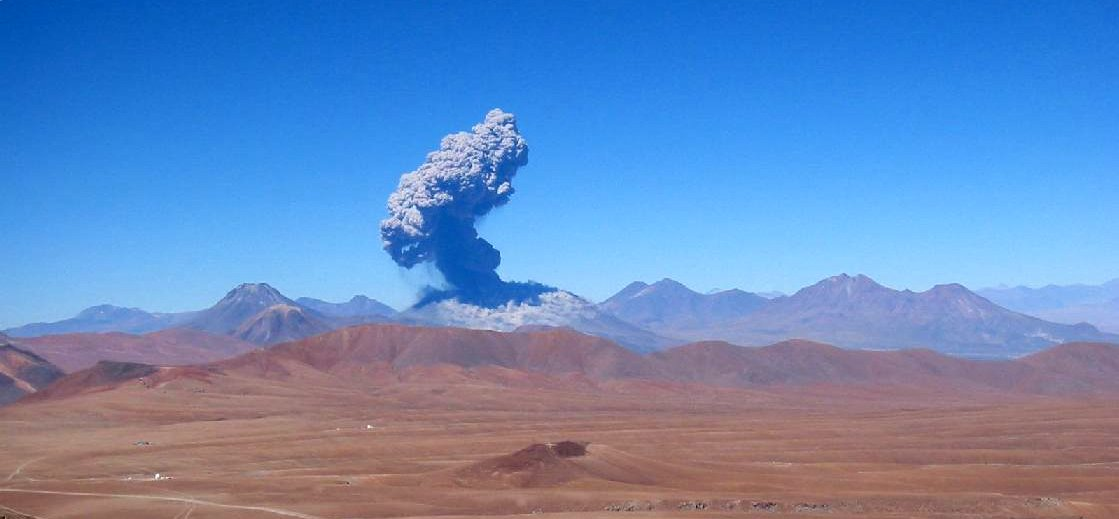
2006 eruption

Further activity occurred in May 2005, with a 8–10-kilometre-high (5.0–6.2 mi) ash cloud, and in April 2006. An eruption commenced at 11:35 local time on 18 April 2006. This explosion was strong enough to rattle windows in the school at Talabre. The 18 April eruption was seen from the El Abra copper mine 220 kilometres (140 mi) away and resulted in ash fall north-northeast from the volcano. Four eruptions occurred at 15:20, 17:22, 19:00 and 21:00 UTC, forming eruption columns reaching altitudes of 10 kilometres (6.2 mi). The next day, additional explosions occurred at 15:04, 15:05 and 17:39 UTC, with a maximum column height of 7 kilometres (4.3 mi). A video taken by the Chilean Air Force on 20 April showed a 50-metre-wide (160 ft) pit in the floor of the main crater. During the following days, additional explosions generated columns up to 3 kilometres (1.9 mi) high, with little ash production. The eruption ended around 15:32 on 20 April, although some explosions occurred in the following days. Other eruptions were recorded in November 2006 and July 2007.

Weak eruptions, characterized by earthquakes and the release of plumes, occurred in February–March 2012 and March–April 2013. Between April and June 2013, glow was observed at the summit, accompanied by the occasional release of gray clouds. Glowing was also reported in October and November 2013. The last eruption, on 30 October 2015, created a 2,500-metre-high (8,200 ft) column of ash that prompted a raise in the local volcano alert level. This eruption may have been triggered by a precipitation event which added water to the volcan's hydrothermal system. Thermal anomalies from this eruption persisted into 2017 but with a tendency to decrease in number, accompanied by persistent degassing. In December 2022, an explosion generated a 6-kilometre-high (3.7 mi) plume. A new lava dome formed inside the active crater in January 2023.

=== Seismic activity ===
Seismic activity occurs at Lascar. Research has indicated peculiar patterns, including so called "rapid-fire" events on a background of continuous activity, as well as the occurrence of long-period earthquakes; here and in other volcanoes, this kind of seismic activity is associated with intense fumarolic activity that occurs in the absence of outright eruptions. Harmonic tremor has been recorded at Lascar, perhaps caused by a hydrothermal system. Such tremors may be produced by the movement of liquid materials in the volcano. With the exception of the 1993 eruption, seismic activity associated with eruptions has been sparse. A number of earthquakes were recorded in early February 2012. Between January 2014 and June 2016, about 2–4 volcano-tectonic earthquakes per month were recorded. Long-period earthquakes with magnitudes not exceeding 1.3 were also recorded, with a maximum of 209 events noted in May 2015.

== Monitoring and threats ==
Because of the volcano's remote location, much information on its activity comes from remote sensing. Lascar's activity has been monitored by Thematic Mapper, which has been used to monitor volcanic activity since 1985, when hot spots were observed on Lascar. The eruptions of April 1993 and September 1986 were both preceded by a reduction of thermal radiation observed by Thematic Mapper.

A monitoring network has been built around the volcano beginning from 2010. These include gas monitoring, seismometers, a weather station and cameras. Unmanned aerial vehicles, occasional reconnaissance flights and infrequent visits to the volcano are also used. The Observatorio Volcanológico de los Andes del Sur in Temuco also employs webcams to watch Lascar. The local Atacameno people have criticized SERNAGEOMIN's volcano monitoring activities, with one responded deeming it too technology-heavy.

The National Geology and Mining Service of Chile considers Lascar Chile's 14th most dangerous volcano, and in 2020 classified it as a "type I" volcano. It and the Argentine volcano monitoring agency publish volcano alert levels for Lascar. SERNAGEOMIN has created a volcano hazard map for the volcano. Explosive eruptions and ash falls are the major threat to humans from Lascar. The frequent smaller explosive events commonly occur unexpectedly and can thus endanger people on the mountain. The towns of Tumbres and Talabre may be affected by pyroclastic flows, and ash falls can occur east of the volcano. Such ash falls could potentially hit the towns of San Pedro de Atacama, Talabre and Toconao as well as the Llano de Chajnantor Observatory, the San Pedro de Atacama–Paso de Jama–Jujuy international road and the Sico Pass. Past eruptions caused ash fall in Argentina and disruption of air travel and could have major effects in the Salta Province in case of renewed activity. In 1982, the town of Talabre was moved for safety reasons stemming from flooding and volcanic activity, and ballistic blocks ejected by the volcano are a threat to mountaineers and scientists working on Lascar. Sector collapse and lahars have occurred in the past, but are unlikely to be present-day hazards.

Heavy metal exposure is a problem for the region. High quantities of arsenic have been observed in local crops; Lascar is one of its major sources in northern Chile. Thallium from the volcano is a pollution hazard in the Talabre area. High nickel concentrations in crops from Talabre appear to be caused by volcanic activity as well.

== Climate and biota ==
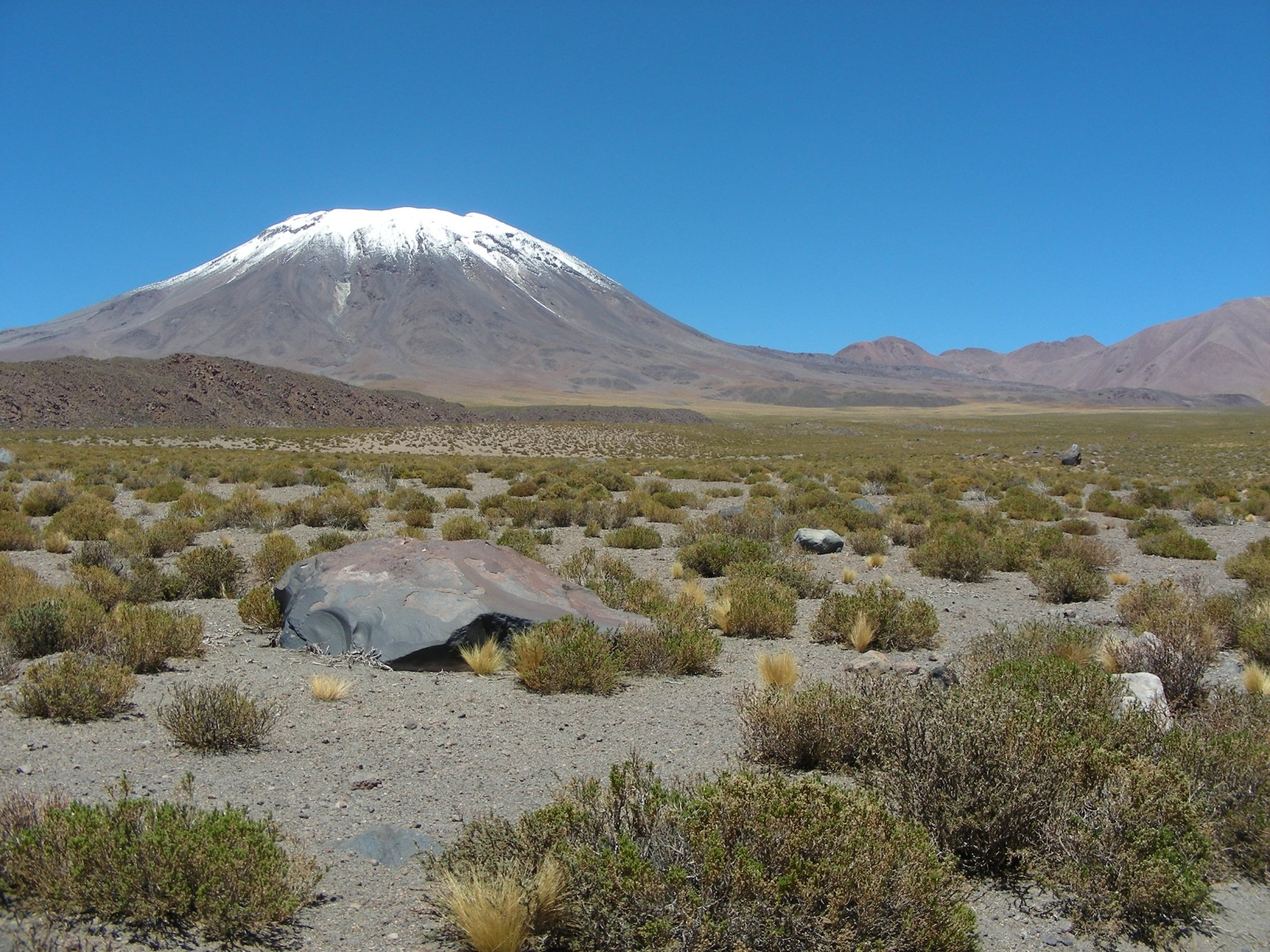
Lascar and vegetation

The area around Lascar is one of the driest and highest volcanic settings in the world. Precipitation at Lascar is about 50–100 millimetres per year (2.0–3.9 in/year) and consists mostly of snow. Persistent snow cover exists on the western and southern slopes of the volcano; it contributes partly to the fumarole water and can yield lahars during eruptions. Steam explosions caused by rainfall have been reported. In 1993, yearly precipitation at several towns around Lascar ranged from 2.5 to 20.1 millimetres (0.098 to 0.791 in). Lascar is located close to the Atacama Desert, one of the world's driest deserts.

During the glacial periods, the volcano most likely featured small glaciers. The equilibrium line at Lascar was at an altitude of 4,700–4,800 metres (15,400–15,700 ft) during the last glacial maximum. Traces of glaciation also exist at Cerros de Saltar. The end of glaciation may have accompanied an increase in volcanic activity, a phenomenon that has been noted at other volcanoes. 8,500 years ago, the climate in the region became much drier, and the amount of erosion decreased substantially.

Temperatures in the surrounding region range between −25 and 40 °C (−13 and 104 °F). Measurements made on the southwest rim of the main crater in 2009–2012 indicated air temperatures of 10–20 °C (50–68 °F). The present-day permanent snowline in the region lies at an altitude of 6,050 metres (19,850 ft), higher than the summit of Lascar.

Due to the dry climate, there is little vegetation at Lascar. Bunch grass and shrubs grow on the volcano's slopes. In the deep valleys, groundwater and streams support more plants.

Volcanic activity at Lascar affects neighbouring ecosystems such as the Aguas Calientes crater lake and Laguna Lejia; flamingos disappeared from the latter after the 1993 eruption and did not return until 2007. Other reports claim that flamingos remained; other animals like donkeys and llamas were seen around the volcano one day after its eruption.

== See also ==
- List of volcanoes in Chile
