= Chile Route 23 =

Highway in Chile

Route 23
- Ruta 23

Location
- Country: Chile

Highway system
- Highways in Chile

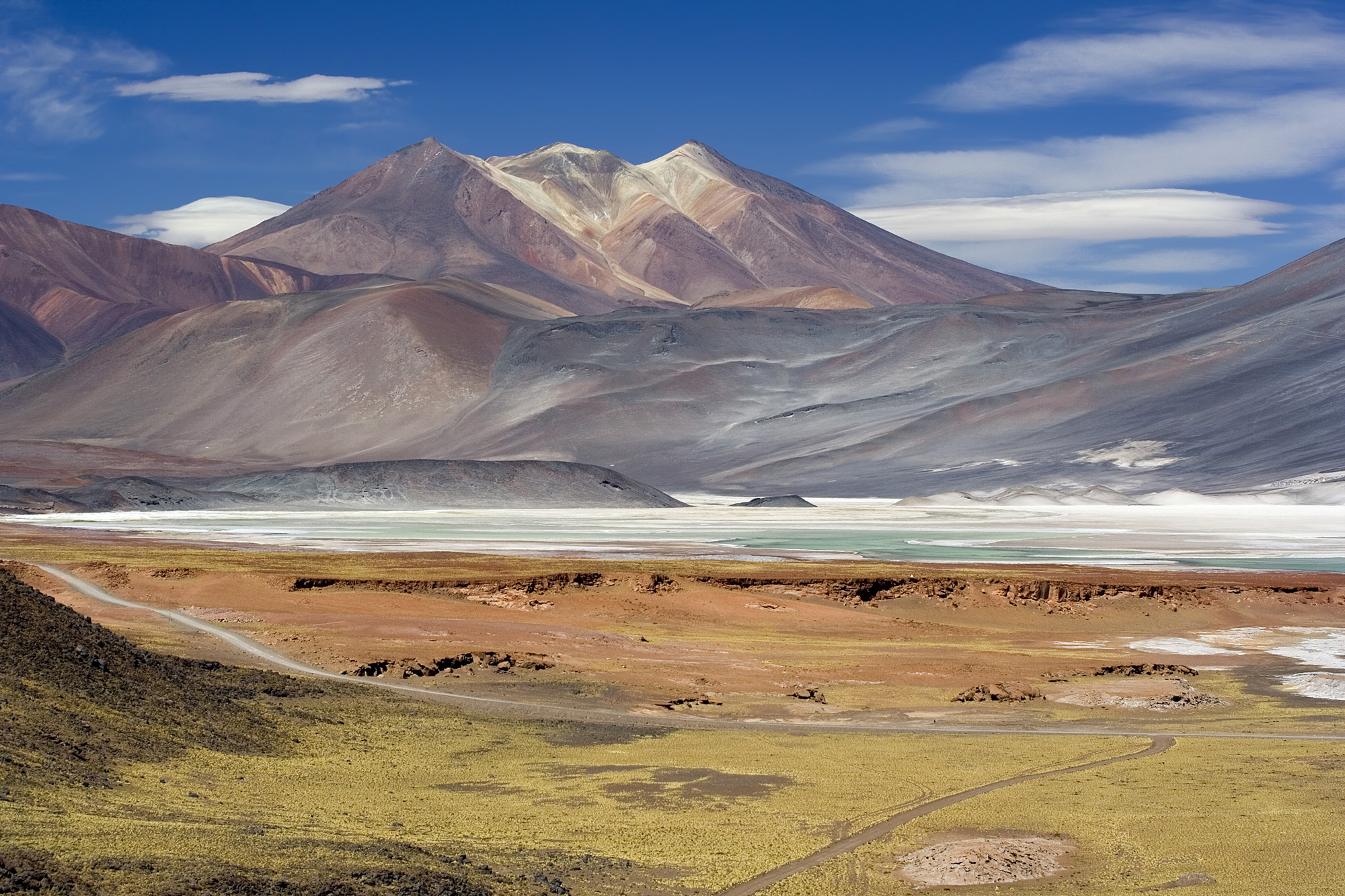
Salar de Talar in the distance. A stretch of Chile Route 23 is also visible.

Chile Route 23 (Ruta 23 CH) is a main road in the northern portion of Chile. It runs for 192.48 km (119.60 mi) from Calama to Sico Pass.

The Route 23 reaches an altitude of 4,580 metres (15,030 ft) 24 km west of the border.

== Places along the road ==
- San Pedro de Atacama
- Salar de Atacama
- Toconao
- Socaire
