= Cerro Overo =

Volcanic crater in Chile

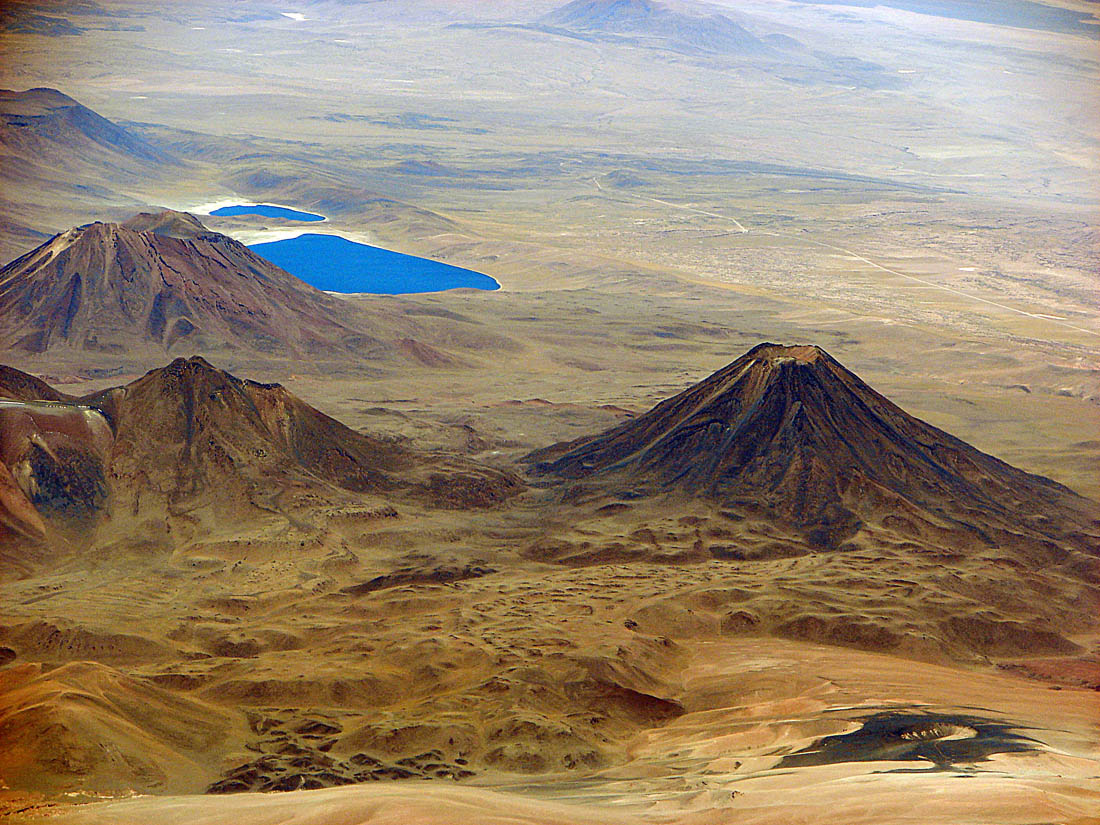
- The maar is visible in the lower right corner of the image

Highest point
- Elevation: 4,555 m (14,944 ft)
- Coordinates: 23°31′03″S 67°39′45″W

Geography
- Location within Chile
- Location: Antofagasta Region, Chile
- Parent range: Andes

Geology
- Mountain type: Maar
- Last eruption: 77,000 years ago

Cerro Overo is a volcanic crater in Chile. It lies at the foot of Chiliques volcano and close to Laguna Lejía, over ignimbrites of Pliocene age erupted by the La Pacana volcano. It is 480 by 580 metres (1,570 ft × 1,900 ft) wide and 72 metres (236 ft) deep and formed through combined explosive-effusive eruptions. The lavas are of lower crustal provenience and are among the least silicic in the region.

== Geography and geomorphology ==
Cerro Overo is a 480 by 580 metres (1,570 ft × 1,900 ft) wide volcanic crater, which is elongated in east-west direction. Its maximum depth is about 72 metres (236 ft). A 1.5 metres (4 ft 11 in) thick layer of ejecta surrounds the maar and has a conspicuous black colour.

Cerro Overo lies on the 4,556 metres (14,948 ft) high Altos del Toro Blanco ridge at the northeastern foot of Chiliques volcano. The La Albondiga lava dome lies about 5 kilometres (3.1 mi) southwest of Cerro Overo. Closed lakes and basins are widespread in the region; Laguna Lejia is such a spring-fed lake 6.3 kilometres (3.9 mi) west-northwest of Cerro Overo.

== Geology ==
Geologically, Cerro Overo is part of the Central Volcanic Zone (CVZ) of the Andes, which is represented by Lascar and Chiliques volcanoes around Cerro Overo. The CVZ is one of four volcanic belts that are located in the Andes, and which include the Northern Volcanic Zone, the Central Volcanic Zone, the Southern Volcanic Zone and the Austral Volcanic Zone. Volcanism occurs due to the subduction of the Nazca Plate off the west coast of South America. Changes in its geometry over time have caused variations in the volcanic activity in the Central Volcanic Zone, the latest of which helped build the Puna-Altiplano, the highest volcanically active high plateau in the world.

The maar is set into Pliocene-age ignimbrites erupted by the La Pacana caldera, and the underlying rocks range in age from Permian to Miocene and include both volcanic and sedimentary rocks. A fault like the Miscanti fault may have controlled its formation; the maar lies at the intersection of several north-northeast trending lineaments with a northwest-southeast trending regional tectonic structure. Most likely, the faults allowed the magma to bypass the crustal structures that intercept mafic magmas such as these of Cerro Overo before they reach the surface. An aquifer may exist inside the Cerro Overo diatreme.

== Composition ==
Cerro Overo has erupted basaltic andesite, which contains phenocrysts of clinopyroxene, olivine and plagioclase. Quartz occurs as xenoliths and xenocrysts. The volcanic rocks define a calc-alkaline suite. They are the least silicic rocks of this region in the Andes and define a mafic member of the Central Volcanic Zone magmatic suite. Such mafic melts are uncommon in the region as the thick crust and underground magmatic processes hinder their ascent.

== Age and origin ==
Based on its appearance, the maar was assigned a possible Holocene or postglacial age. Radiometric dating yielded an older age, of no more than 77,000 ± 7,800 years ago. The eruption emplaced about eight separate units of volcanic rocks, including about 0.0004 cubic kilometres (9.6×10^{−5} cu mi) of lava and 0.000119 cubic kilometres (2.9×10^{−5} cu mi) of tephra. Magma rapidly ascended to the surface and triggered explosive, effusive and phreatomagmatic activity, which occurred owing to the availability of groundwater. After its emplacement, the crater was partially filled by wind-transported and alluvial sediments.

== See also ==
- List of volcanoes in Chile
