= Tumisa =

Pleistocene stratovolcano in the Andes

- Cerro Tumisa
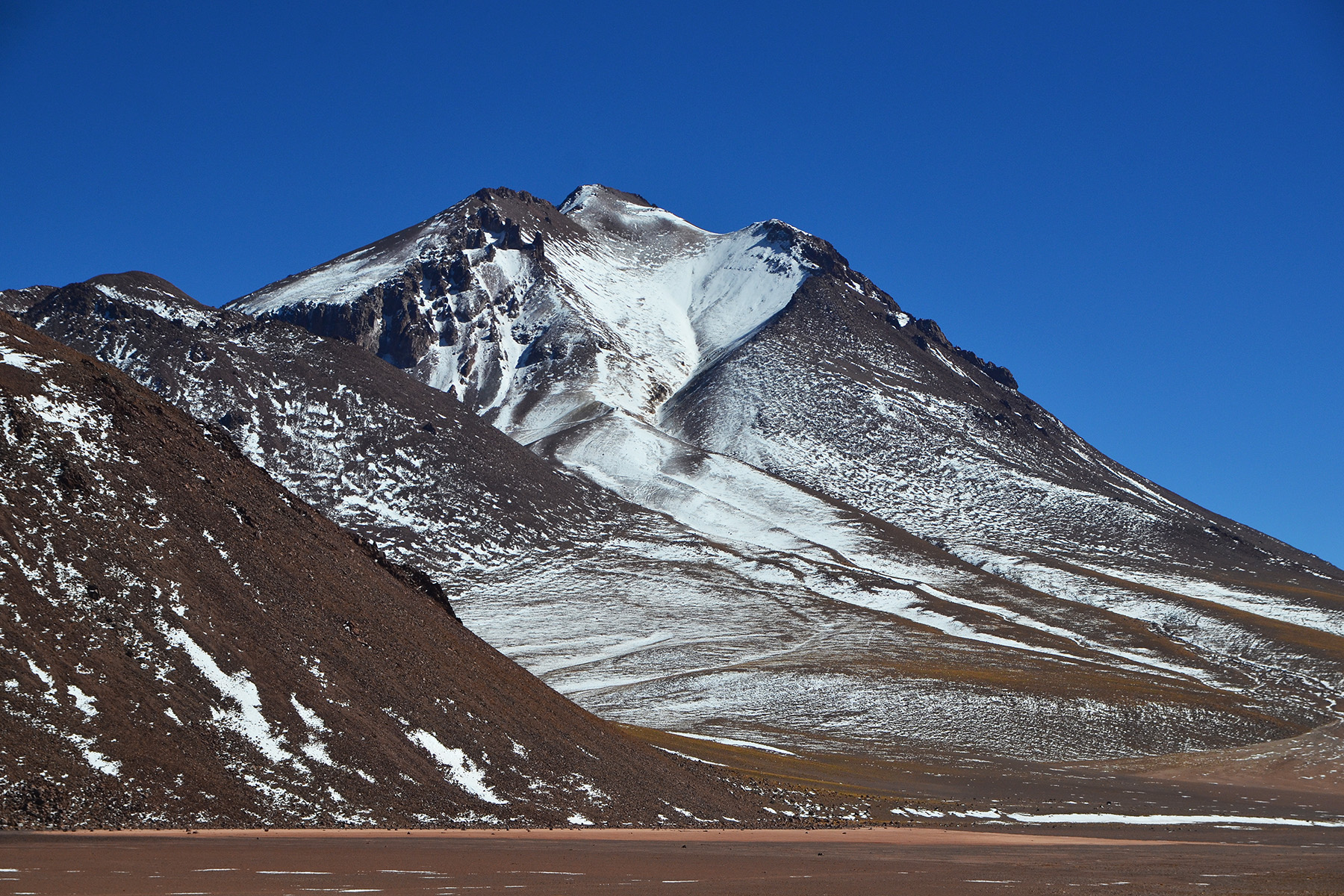
- Cerro Tumisa

Highest point
- Elevation: 5,658 m (18,563 ft)
- Coordinates: 23°28′S 67°49′W

Geography
- Location within Chile
- Parent range: Andes

Geology
- Rock age: Pleistocene
- Mountain type: Stratovolcano
- Volcanic belt: Central Volcanic Zone
- Last eruption: 500,000 years ago

Tumisa (also known as Cerro Tumisa) is a Pleistocene stratovolcano in the Andes. Located east of the Salar de Atacama, it is part of the Central Volcanic Zone, which since the Miocene has been subject to extensive andesitic/dacitic effusive activity and ignimbrite eruptions. The basement on which Tumisa is built includes Paleozoic rocks and more recent volcanic products of the Lejia volcano and the Atana and Patao ignimbrites.

Block flows, lava flows, lava domes and some ignimbrites of pumiceous composition form this composite volcano. More than six lava domes and two major cones are part of this system and surrounded by a pyroclastic apron, which covers a surface area of 300 square kilometres (120 sq mi) and is formed from many pyroclastic flows with a total volume of 21 cubic kilometres (5.0 cu mi). The pyroclastic flows contain pumice and large blocks, some of which show signs of deformation when they were still hot. The lava domes and lavas are grouped in three units. Presumably, the activity of Tumisa started with explosive eruptions that generated the ignimbrite apron, later degassed magma formed the lava domes and lava flows.

Dating of the volcano indicates that it becomes younger with higher altitude, a pattern that may be explained either by a shift in the magmatic system or a progressive downslope sliding of the volcano during its history at a speed of 0.5–2 centimetres per year (0.20–0.79 in/year). Tumisa developed atop lake sediments which facilitate sliding. This interpretation is supported by the drainage patterns of the volcano, with channels bending outwards and curving towards the west. These channels possibly formed over faults of the slipping volcano. Valleys (quebradas) were excavated less than one million years ago during the glacial stages in Tumisa's northern flank. Moraines are also found and reflect the past occurrence of glaciation on the mountain; they lie at around 4,900 metres (16,100 ft) elevation.

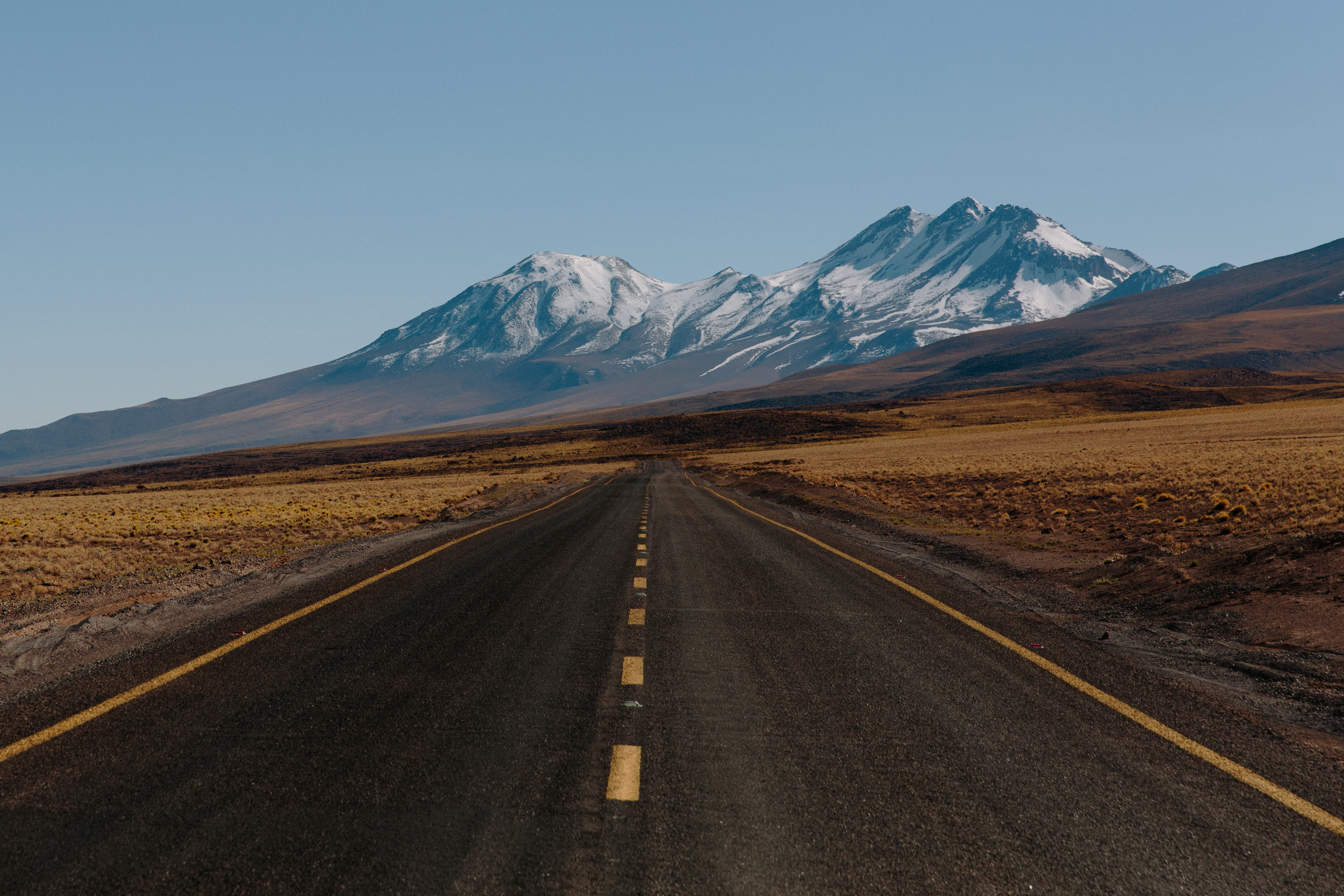
Tumisa and the Ruta 23-CH road

The volcano has erupted dacitic lavas containing andesitic mafic inclusions. These inclusions resemble those from the Soncor flow of neighbouring Lascar to the northeast. Some rocks may have been influenced by the interaction with calcium carbonate in the magma chambers. Hornblende crystals with dimensions of 5–10 millimetres (0.20–0.39 in) and megacrysts of feldspar with dimensions of up to 1.5 centimetres (0.59 in) are also present. The textures of the products suggest that magma mixing occurred during activity. The dacites have a white porphyritic appearance. The dome complex is dated 2.5-0.5 mya and the associated pyroclastics 1.5-0.5 mya and constructed on Tertiary ignimbrites. One date of 1.2±0.6 million years was obtained from the Las Mulas dome. The complex is of Pleistocene age. Later, hydrothermal alteration occurred.

A fault with probably postglacial activity crosses Lejía Lake and is associated with Tumisa, connecting Tumisa with a basaltic maar and an isolated lava dome. It runs in northwest-southeast direction and crosses Lejia on its southern margin.

An abandoned sulfur mine lies on its eastern slope and a road leads to it, and there is a mountain sanctuary. Tumisa and its neighbouring mountains Lausa, Chiliques, Ipira and Miñiques are identified by the inhabitants of Socaire to be part of a giant human left hand with dimensions of 40 by 30 kilometres (25 mi × 19 mi) on the eastern horizon.
