= Chiliques =

Mountain in Chile

Chiliques Volcano in Chile
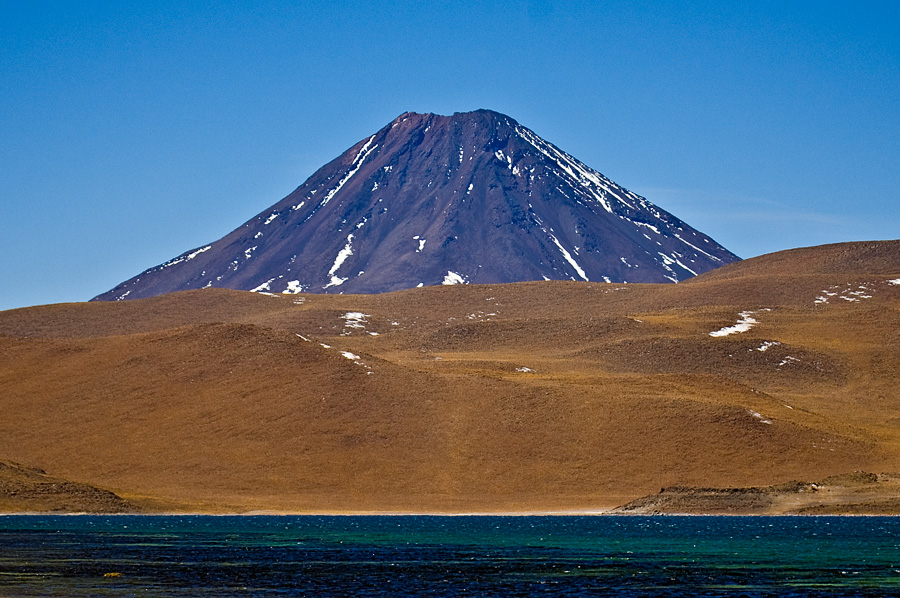
- The Chiliques volcano, seen from Laguna Miscanti

Highest point
- Elevation: 5,778 m (18,957 ft)
- Coordinates: 23°35′0″S 67°42′0″W

Geography
- Location: Chile
- Parent range: Andes

Geology
- Mountain type: Stratovolcano
- Last eruption: Unknown

Chiliques is a stratovolcano located in the Antofagasta Region of Chile.

Chiliques is capped off by a 500 metres (1,600 ft) wide summit crater, which contains two crater lakes. One of these lakes is found in the northern part and the other east-southeastern part. The volcano is formed by rocks ranging from andesite to dacite; the andesites of the main stratocone building phase contain pyroxene. Together with Tumisa, Leija and Cordón de Puntas Negras it forms a northwest-trending volcano alignment.

The first part of Chiliques to form was a block lava field, which still crops out northeast of the main volcano to a distance of 6.5 kilometres (4.0 mi). Lava flows with lengths of up to 10 kilometres (6.2 mi) then constructed the stratovolcano proper and were later buried by shorter (up to 5 kilometres (3.1 mi)) lava flows that cover a surface of 16.26 square kilometres (6.28 sq mi) around the summit crater. The Cerro Overo maar northeast of Chiliques is occasionally considered the last phase of Chiliques's activity, and the two have erupted rocks with similar chemical composition but later research suggests that they are unrelated. There is no evidence for historical activity.

Over the years, Chiliques has been monitored from space by ASTER imagery. In 2002, the imagery showed evidence of a temperature anomaly on Chiliques, which occasionally reached a scale of 15 °C (27 °F). This temperature anomaly may reflect either thermal events in crater lakes or fumarolic activity, although evidence for the occurrence of either is equivocal. Some of the anomalies were observed in the crater and others on the upper slopes of the volcano. This anomaly lasted only a few months. A subsequent expedition to the crater found no evidence of eruptions nor of any anomalous temperatures in the crater lake. Future eruptions are likely going to be lava flows and only impact the immediate surroundings of the volcano, although larger eruptions may impact the roads around Huaytiquina pass and Socaire.

Magnetotelluric investigation of the region has shown evidence of a high-conductivity structure underground between Chiliques, Cordón de Puntas Negras and Láscar. This high conductivity zone reaches a depth of 6 kilometres (3.7 mi) at its southern end, and it might reflect the presence of magma underground.

The lake Laguna Lejia lies north of Chiliques volcano, other parts of the volcano drain into the Salar de Atacama; the volcano forms part of the drainage divide of the salar. A pre-modern route goes up the mountain and aside from the steep slopes and height of the mountain, does not feature any major difficulties.

The town of Socaire is found west of Chiliques, and the volcano has cultural importance to the town, with the volcano being considered the origin of the water for Socaire and part of a cosmological representation together with the neighbouring mountains Tumisa, Lausa, Ipira and Miñiques. Seen from Socaire, the sun rises behind Chiliques during St. Bartholomew's Day; St. Bartholomew is an important saint for the town. Archeological findings made on Chiliques include pottery, a stone room and an elliptical structure in the summit area. Additional platforms and stone structures are found lower on its slopes, and an Incan tambo even farther down. Such archeological sites on mountains are common in Chile, with Licancabur and Cerro Quimal being examples of other mountains with such structures.
