= Aguas Calientes (volcano) =

Mountain in Chile

- Cerro Aguas Calientes
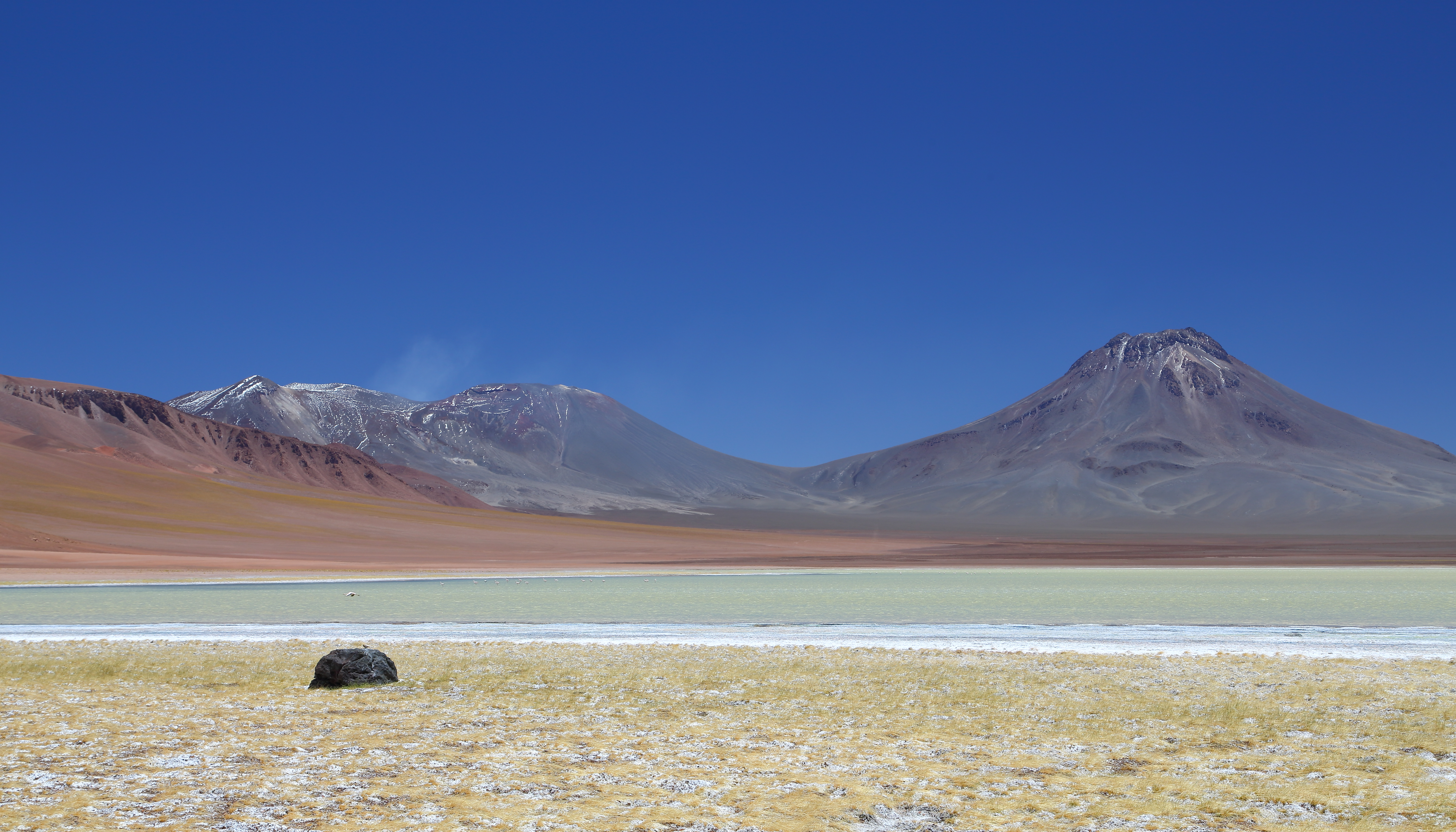
- Aguas Calientes on the right. The ridge on the left foreground is Cerro Corona. Behind it is Lascar volcano, and in foreground is Lake Lejía.

Highest point
- Elevation: 5,924 m (19,436 ft)
- Listing: List of volcanoes in Chile
- Coordinates: 23°21′47″S 67°40′55″W

Geography
- Location within Chile
- Location: Antofagasta, Chile
- Parent range: Andes

Geology
- Mountain type: Stratovolcano

Aguas Calientes Volcano or Cerro Aguas Calientes, also called Simba, is a cone-shaped stratovolcano located 5 kilometres (3 mi) east of the Lascar volcano and 14 kilometres (8.7 mi) north of Laguna Lejía, Chile. It is located within a 500 square kilometres (190 sq mi) area where the Cordón de Puntas Negras and the Cordón Chalviri volcanic chains intersect. The volcano is constructed from andesite and dacite containing hornblende and anhydrite; its pyroclastics are all older than Lascar. It has a diameter of about 7 kilometres (4.3 mi). Some xenoliths of calc-alkaline material are found in Aguas Calientes lavas, and magma mixing has generated lavas containing andesite inclusions in dacites. One eruption of Aguas Calientes postdates the first centre of Lascar and was originally linked to the Lascar Piedras Grandes eruption, before sampling on the deposits of this eruption indicated a relationship with the Lascar volcano itself. Effusion of lava ceased after the cone was built. One summit lava flow may be of Holocene age, but no evidence of historical activity is found .

The volcano has been affected by glaciation. Glacial U-shaped valleys are found on the northern and western flanks, giving the volcano some angular patterns. One valley with glacial features and a subglacial river channel at 4,650 metres (15,260 ft) altitude is found on the northern flank. It extends down to the valley north of Aguas Calientes and intersects the youngest lavas of the volcano.

Aguas Calientes has a well formed summit crater. A small crater lake is found within the Aguas Calientes summit crater, making it one of the highest lakes in the world at an altitude of 5,870 metres (19,260 ft). The lake has a surface area of 2,500 square metres (27,000 sq ft) and is tinged red from a population of microorganisms. The lake water is acidic and is frequently influenced by activity from Lascar, with winds carrying sulfuric acid and water vapour clouds to the crater lake. Precipitation was measured at 146 millimetres per year (5.7 in/year) with most precipitation falling during the winter months, and strong UV irradiation. The lake has a bacterial ecosystem that is primarily reliant on photosynthesis but may also be influenced by hydrothermal activity from Aguas Calientes volcano. Research has found only limited numbers of bacterial taxa and a large number of DNA sequences that cannot be identified as known phylogenetic groups. The lake has been studied as a possible terrestrial analogy to Mars.

== See also ==
- List of volcanoes in Chile
