= Laguna Lejía =

Lake in Chile

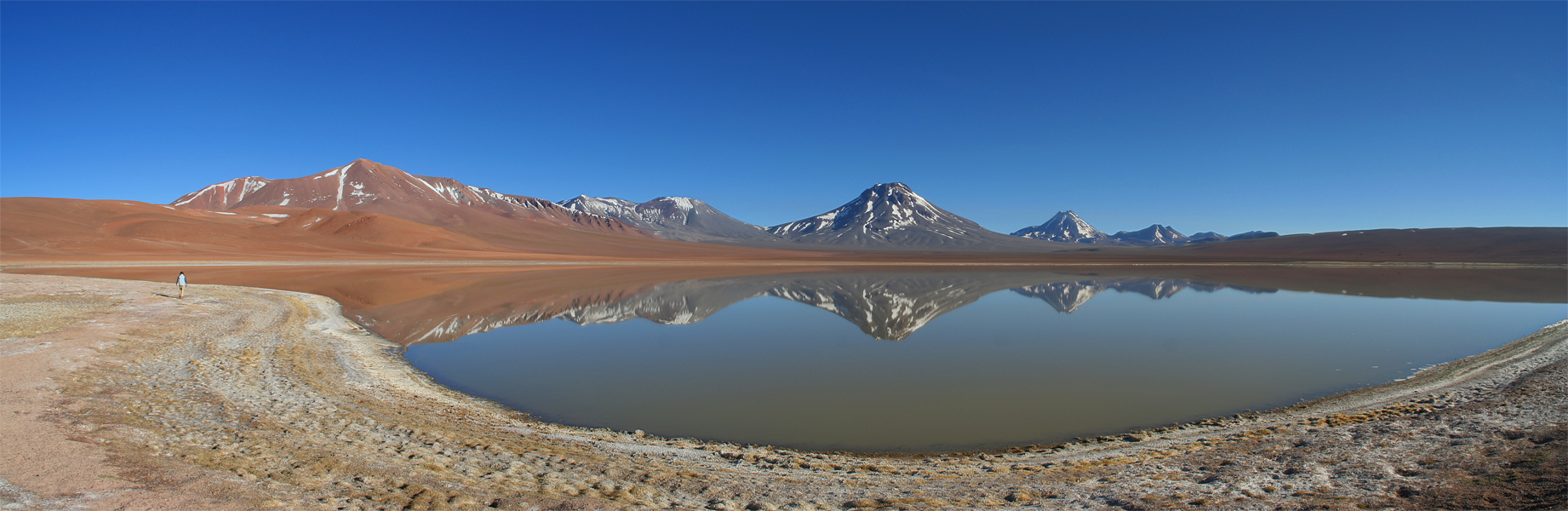
- Laguna Lejía with the Lascar, Aguas Calientes and Acamarachi volcanoes in the background

- Location within Chile
- Location: Antofagasta Region
- Coordinates: 23°30′00″S 67°41′33″W
- Catchment area: 193 km^{2} (75 sq mi)
- Basin countries: Chile
- Surface area: 1.9 km^{2} (0.73 sq mi)
- Surface elevation: 4,325 m (14,190 ft)

Laguna Lejía is a salt lake located in the Altiplano of the Antofagasta Region of northern Chile. The landscape of the area is dominated by the volcanoes Chiliques, Lascar, Aguas Calientes and Acamarachi. It is shallow and has no outlet, covering a surface area of about 1.9 square kilometres (0.73 sq mi) in the present-day.

During glacial times, the lake was considerably larger owing to decreased evaporation and increased precipitation rates, with bioherms developing around the waterbody. Presently, flamingos and a number of microorganisms live in the lake.

== Geography and geology ==
Lejía Lake lies in the Puna de Atacama of Chile, close to the border with Argentina. The city of San Pedro de Atacama lies 103 kilometres (64 mi) northwest of Lejía Lake. The lake basin is surrounded by volcanoes, such as Aguas Calientes, Lascar, Tumisa, Lejía, Chiliques and Cordon de Puntas Negras, and smaller centres like Cerro Overo and La Albòndiga. The lake is endorheic and has a 193 square kilometres (75 sq mi) large catchment, and a lava flow forms its southern shore. Farther south lie two other lakes, Laguna Miscanti and Laguna Miniques.

=== Hydrology ===
Lejía Lake is a circular, shallow lake at an elevation of 4,325 metres (14,190 ft) with a surface area of 1.9 square kilometres (0.73 sq mi) or 2 square kilometres (0.77 sq mi). It is a polymictic lake which freezes over occasionally and whose waters are turned over quickly, mainly through evaporation. Winds sometimes create foam on the lake's surface and blow them onto the shores. Water temperatures have been measured to range between 3–10.6 °C (37.4–51.1 °F), and the lake is about 1.2 metres (3 ft 11 in) deep.

The waters of the lake are oligohaline and salinity is often different in one part of the lake from the rest. Sulfate and sodium are the principal salts in the lake water, with chloride and magnesium secondary and calcium, potassium, silica and strontium subordinate. Volcano-derived elements like arsenic, boron, fluorine and lithium also occur.

The lake is nourished from the north through two creeks, one originates on Aguas Calientes and the other from two tributaries on Lascar and Cerro del Abra. From Chiliques and Lejia in the south other creeks run north and enter the southern part of the lake. A groundwater outlet appears to exist, considering that there is no halite accumulating in the lake, and Cerro Overo is a maar that formed through groundwater-magma interaction.

=== Lake history ===
The lake lies in a tectonic depression, which is geologically related to the fault system Miscanti-Callejón de Varela; once it was thought that the lake was in a caldera. The Altos de Toro Blanco mountains separate Lejía Lake's drainage basin from the Salar de Aguas Calientes catchment. A lineament known as the Tumisa line runs along the southern shore of the lake, and appears to have been the site of three earthquakes in post-glacial time. The lake is influenced by volcanic activity from the neighbouring Lascar; ash and pyroclastic material entered Lejía Lake in 1993, and the large Soncor eruption from this volcano 26,450 years before present filled the lake.

During glacial times, the lake was considerably larger, reaching a surface area of 10 square kilometres (3.9 sq mi) with water levels rising to about 25 metres (82 ft) above present-day level; the lake was filled with freshwater at that time. A volcanic marker dated to 16,700 ± 2,000 years before present pre-dates the lake highstand; this volcanic marker is a tephra erupted by the Cerro Corona lava dome south of Lascar. Lake levels stayed high until the Holocene and then decreased; the timing of Holocene changes is unknown. These earlier larger lakes have left terraces around Lejía Lake which contain bioherms and stromatolith leftovers. Water level fluctuations drove changes in microbial ecosystems around the lake. Even older deposits associated with the Lake Minchin wet period are not present at Lejía Lake unlike other Altiplanic lakes, probably owing to volcanic activity that disrupted the sediments. The environment at Laguna Lejía has been used as analogues for ancient lakes on Mars like Jezero crater, which might have been habitable before they dried up.

The increase in surface area was a consequence of increased precipitation and increased cloud cover which decreased its evaporation rate. Sediment cores have shown evidence of separate lake stages with water levels mostly higher than today; higher moisture levels owing to a displacement of the tropical circulation during the Lake Tauca stage have been invoked to explain higher lake levels in Lejía and other regional waterbodies. Glaciers developed in the region as well but did not reach the lake.

== Climate ==
Precipitation around the lake is about 200 millimetres per year (7.9 in/year) mostly during the summer months, considerably less than the annual evaporation rate. Temperatures range −6–7 °C (21–45 °F) with an average temperature of 2 °C (36 °F); night temperatures can drop to −18 – −25 °C (0 – −13 °F). There is strong daily and interannual variability of the weather. During glacial highstands, precipitation was about double that of today.

== Biology ==
Lejía Lake is colonized by diatoms, including Amphora coffeaeformis, Cyclotella michiganiana, Cyclotella stelligera, Cymbella pusilla, Navicula halophila, and Navicula radiosa. Algal and bacterial mats also occur in the lake. The ecosystem of Laguna Lejía is exposed to high UV radiation, intense day-night temperature cycles, and lack of water.

Ostracods in the lake include Limnocythere species. The occurrence of their shells in lake sediments has been used to reconstruct the history of the lake, including its salinity. Crustaceans are also found, such as Alona species, Diacyclops andinus, Harpacticoida species, and Macrothrix palearis. Finally, chironomid flies have been encountered at Lejía Lake. Flamingos, phalaropes and their parasites exist at the lake.

Shoreline vegetation consists of Calandrinia, Deyeuxia, Puccinellia and Stipa species, which occur close to waterbodies and springs. Grass and shrub vegetation of the Puna occurs in the lake basin at elevations of less than 4,500 metres (14,800 ft); at higher elevation bunch grass, cushion plants and rosette plants form a distinct and sparse vegetation. Humans have pastures at the lake.

== Archeology ==
Archeological artifacts from the archaic period have been found on an upper terrace of the lake, indicating that ancient hunters did head to Lejía Lake at that time.
