= Aymara =

Aymara may refer to:

== Languages and people ==
- Aymaran languages, the second most widespread Andean language
  - Aymara language, the main language within that family
  - Central Aymara, the other surviving branch of the Aymara(n) family, which today includes only the endangered Jaqaru/Kawki language
- Aymara people, the native ethnic group identified with the speakers of Altiplano Aymara

== Culture ==
- Corazón Aymara (English: Aymara Heart), 1925 Bolivian silent feature film directed by Pedro Sambarino
- Grupo Aymara, Bolivian folk troupe of traditional music of pre-Hispanic and contemporary music of the Andes
- Socialist Aymara Group (Spanish: Grupo Aymara Socialista), left-wing indigenous political group in Bolivia

== Places ==
- Aymaraes Province, the largest of seven provinces of the Apurímac Region in Peru
- Aymara Lupaca Reserved Zone, a protected area in southeastern Peru

== Science ==
- Aymara (moth), a genus of moths in the family Apatelodinae
