= Sico Pass =

Mountain pass on the border between Argentina and Chile

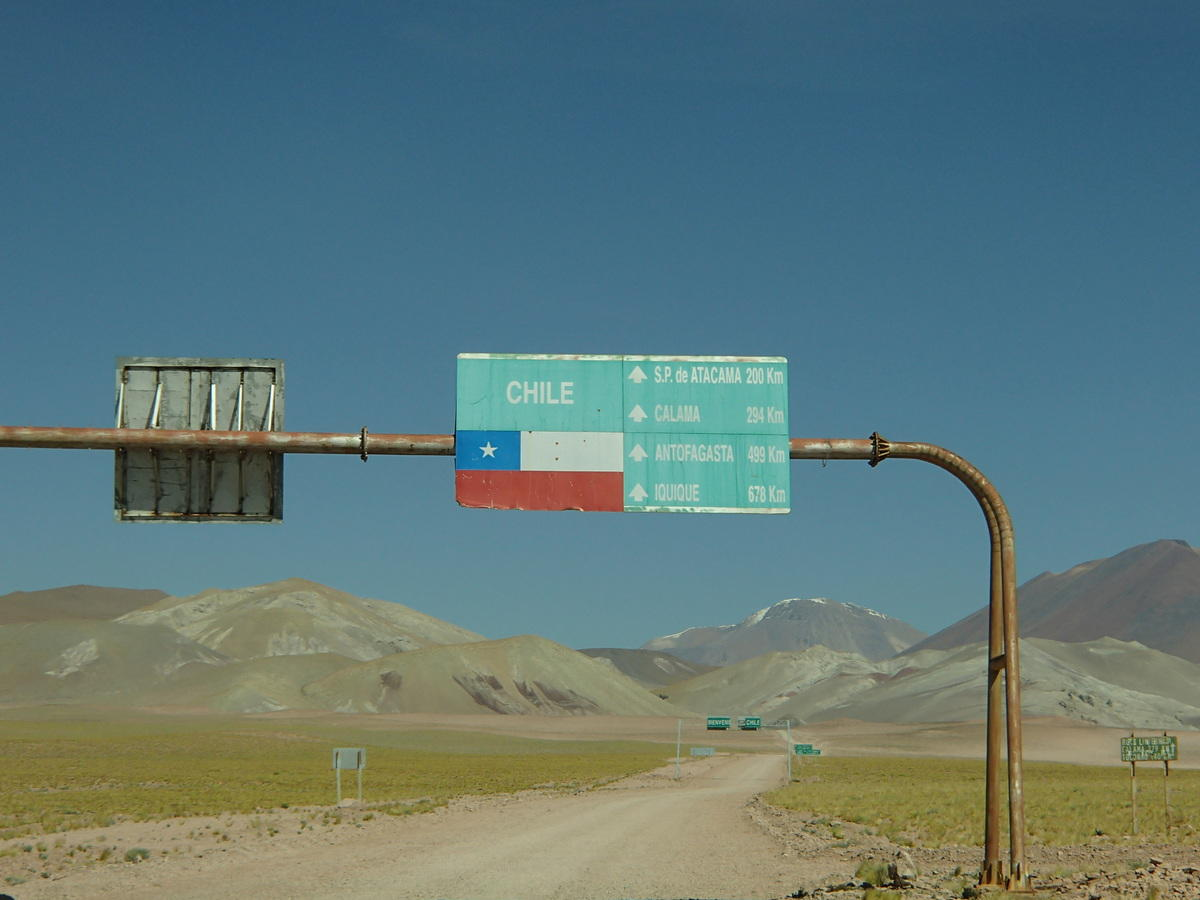

- Location within Argentina
- Elevation: 4,092 m (13,425 ft)

Third Approach
- Location: Argentina–Chile border
- Range: Andes
- Coordinates: 23°50′S 67°15′W

Sico Pass (Spanish: Paso de Sico) is a mountain pass on the border between Argentina and Chile. The pass is located on the main divide of the Andes. Administratively, it separates the province of Salta in Argentina and the region of Antofagasta in Chile.

The pass is served by Chile Route 23, here a paved road, and Argentina Route 51, connecting San Pedro de Atacama on the Chilean side with Catua and San Antonio de los Cobres on the Argentinian side. The Chile Route 23 reaches an altitude of 4,580 metres (15,030 ft) 24 km west of the border.

== Gallery ==
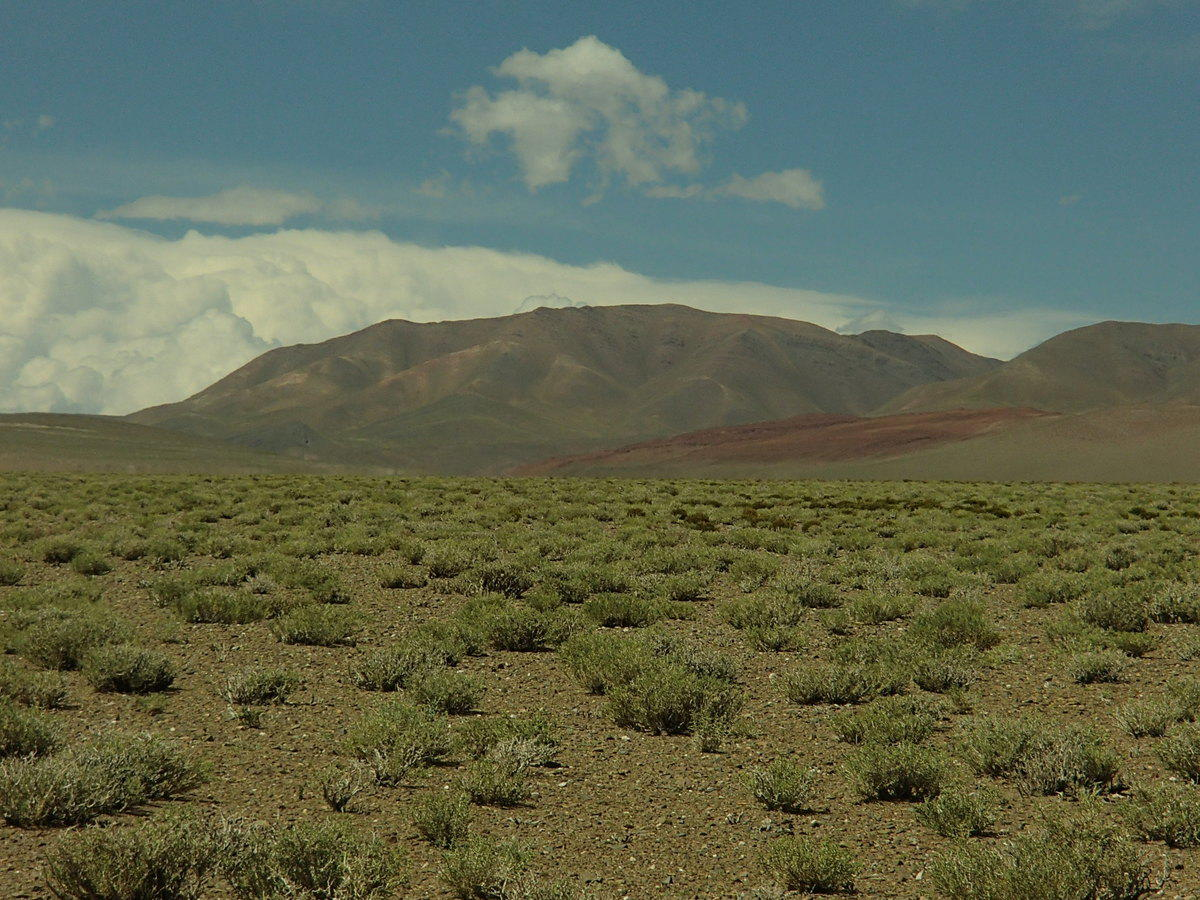
Argentine side of the border near Paso Sico

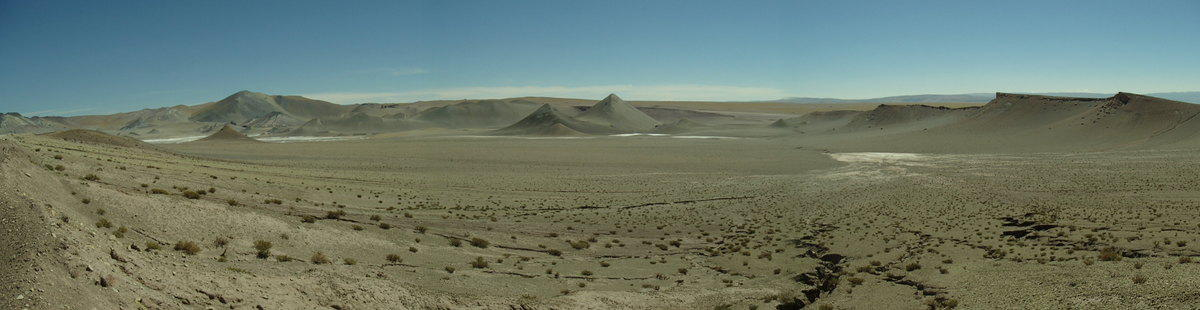
Mountains on the Chilean side of the border near Paso Sico

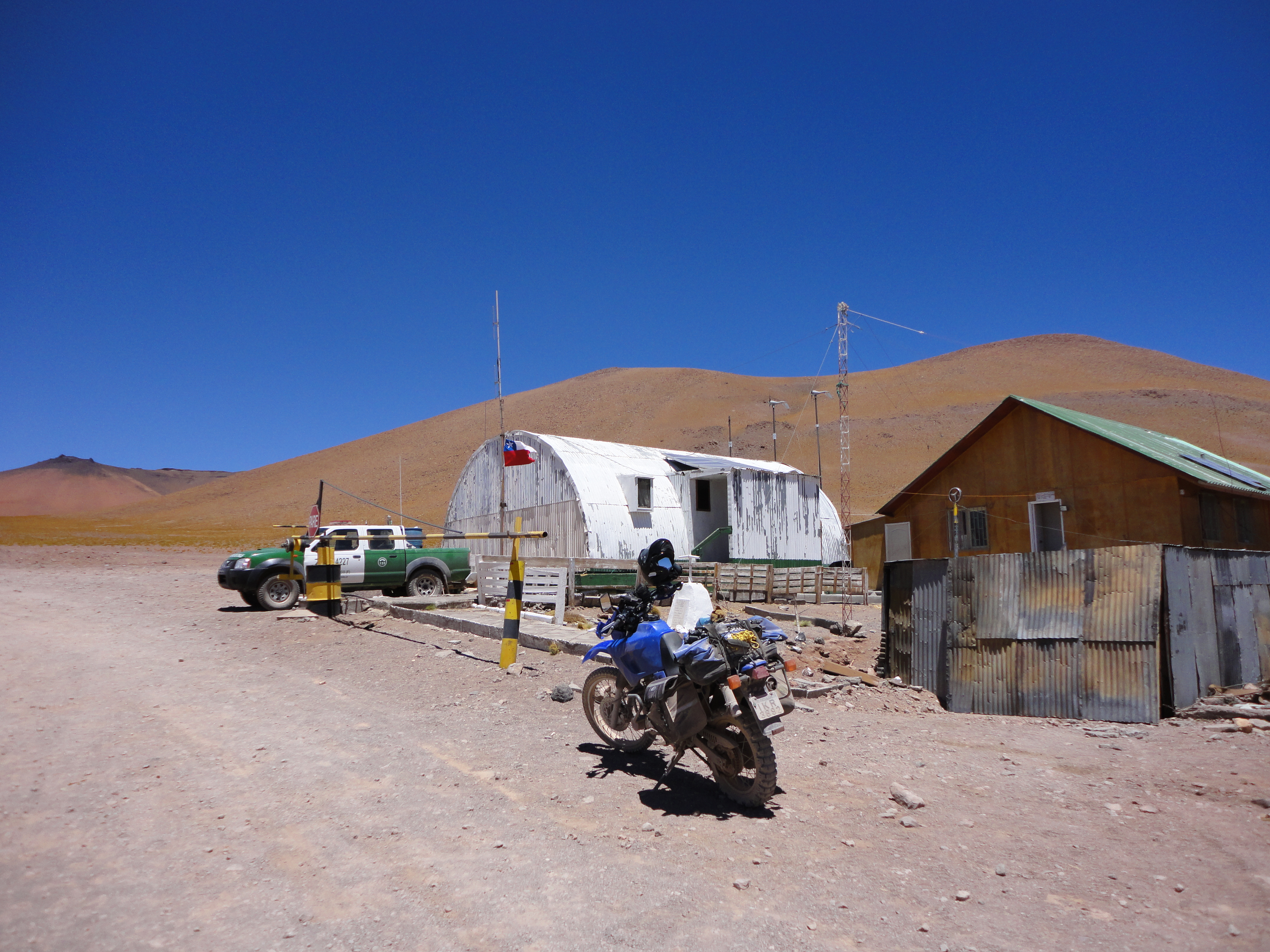
Chilean customs/police outpost
