= Toconao =

- Village
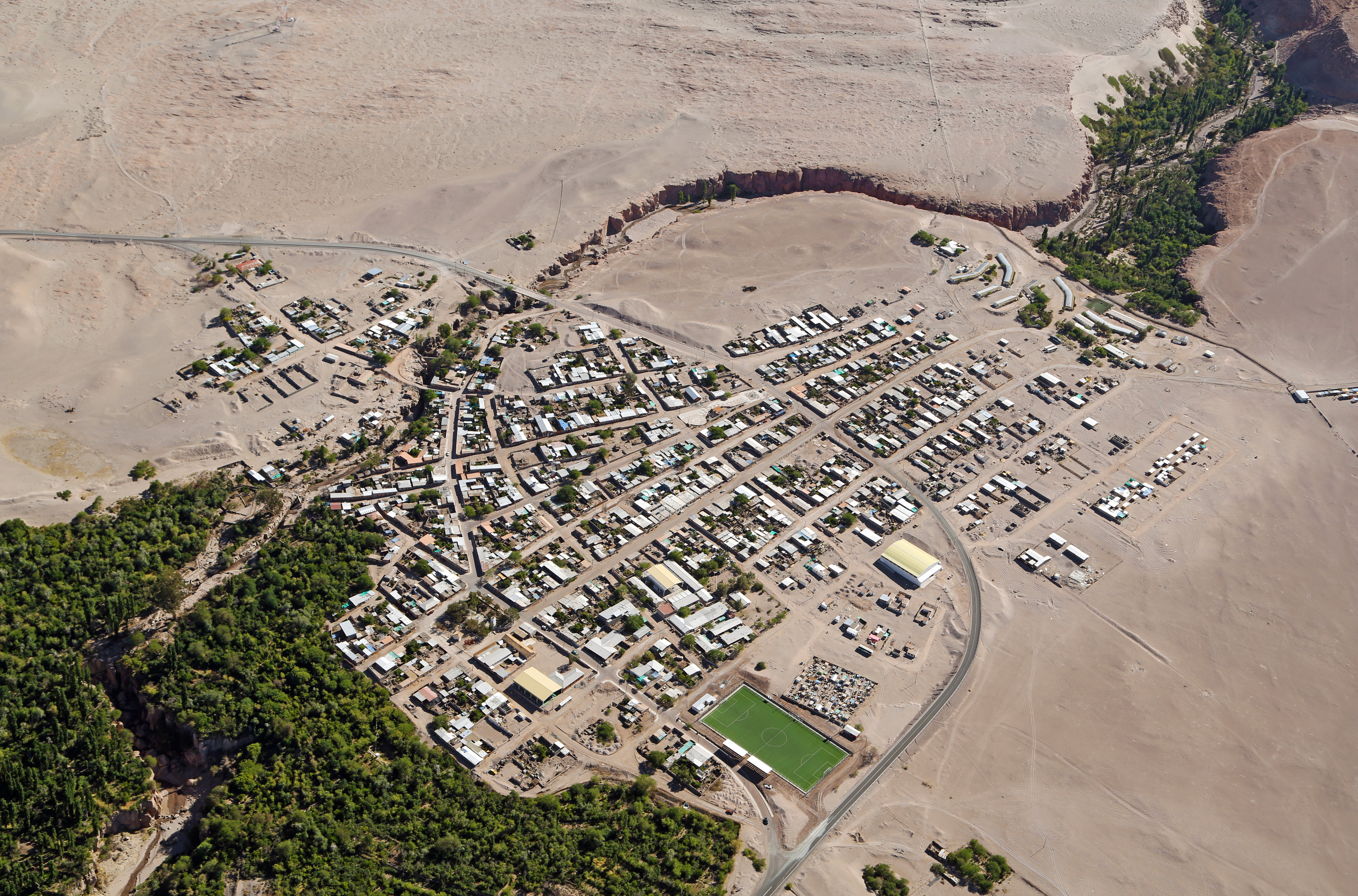
- Toconao seen from above

- Location of Toconao in Chile.
- Coordinates: 23°11′25″S 68°00′18″W
- Country: Chile
- Region: Antofagasta Region
- Province: El Loa Province
- Elevation: 2,485 m (8,153 ft)

Toconao is a village 38 km (24 mi) south of San Pedro de Atacama in the San Pedro de Atacama province of Chile's northern Antofagasta Region. It lies at an elevation of 2,485 m (8,153 ft) above sea level, close to the northeast margin of the Salar de Atacama.

The most notable building in Toconao is its church. The bell tower is separated from the main church structure and dates from 1750.

== Climate ==
Climate data for Toconao
Month	Jan	Feb	Mar	Apr	May	Jun	Jul	Aug	Sep	Oct	Nov	Dec	Year
Mean daily maximum °C (°F)	27.5 (81.5)	27.3 (81.1)	26.4 (79.5)	24.8 (76.6)	21.7 (71.1)	19.0 (66.2)	18.7 (65.7)	21.0 (69.8)	22.6 (72.7)	24.9 (76.8)	26.1 (79.0)	27.6 (81.7)	24.0 (75.2)
Mean daily minimum °C (°F)	11.0 (51.8)	11.2 (52.2)	10.2 (50.4)	8.6 (47.5)	6.1 (43.0)	3.8 (38.8)	3.3 (37.9)	5.3 (41.5)	6.5 (43.7)	8.3 (46.9)	9.0 (48.2)	11.2 (52.2)	7.9 (46.2)
Average precipitation mm (inches)	7 (0.3)	11 (0.4)	8 (0.3)	0 (0)	1 (0.0)	2 (0.1)	0 (0)	0 (0)	1 (0.0)	0 (0)	0 (0)	1 (0.0)	31 (1.2)
Average relative humidity (%)	31	38	33	26	23	24	23	20	16	16	19	24	24
Source: Atlas Agroclimatico de Chile (temperatures 1988–2007, precipitation 1975–2009, humidity 1988–2015)
