= Socaire =

Village in northern Chile

Coordinates: 23°35′25″S 67°53′25″W

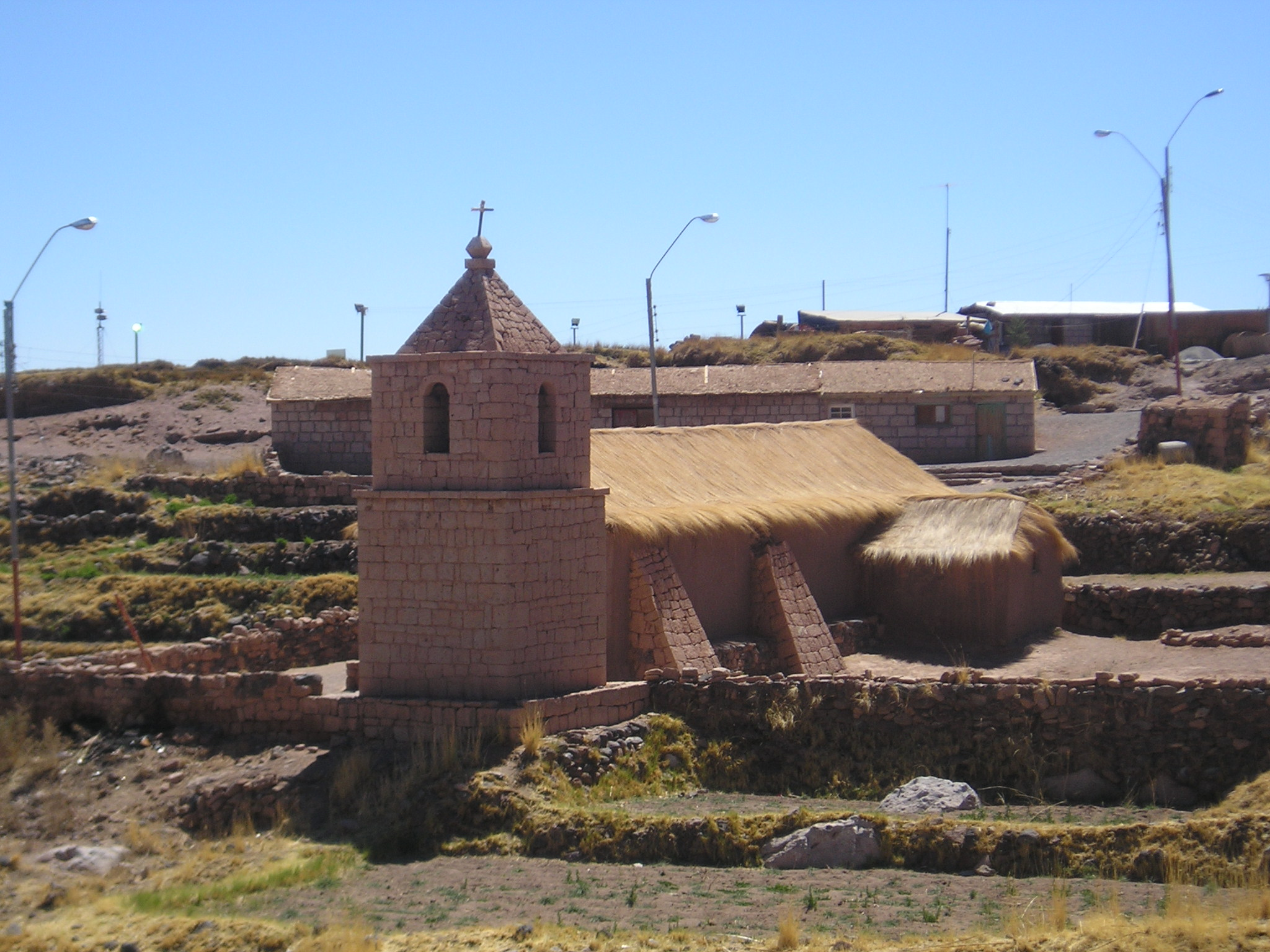
Old Church of Socaire

Socaire is a village located 80 km (50 mi) southeast of the town of San Pedro de Atacama, in the San Pedro de Atacama province of Chile's northern Antofagasta Region. It offers views overlooking the Salar de Atacama.

The local economy is dominated by agriculture and non-metallic mining. Ancient agricultural terraces are part of the landscape of the area.

== See also ==
- Atacama Desert
- Laguna Miscanti
- Chiliques
- Laguna Lejía
