= Salar de Pedernales =

Salt flat in Atacama, Chile

Coordinates: 26°13′42″S 69°08′51″W

Salar de Pedernales is a large salt flat in the Atacama Region of Chile. It lies east of the Cordillera Domeyko at an elevation of 3,370 metres (11,060 ft). The salt flat has an irregular shape and consists mostly of gypsum and rock salt, with an area of 0.6 to 1.1 square kilometres (0.23 to 0.42 sq mi) covered by open water. During the late Pleistocene, the climate was wetter and thus open water covered a much larger area of Salar de Pedernales.

Rocks around Salar de Pedernales range in age from Paleozoic to Miocene. The salt flat formed when during the formation of the Andes, the former course of the Río Salado was blocked. Presently, the main water source of Salar de Pedernales is the Ola river, which enters from the southeast.

The salt flat is a habitat for birds (mainly flamingoes) and lizards. Prehistoric people used resources around the area, leaving numerous archaeological sites. Presently, the Ola river is used as a water source for nearby mining operations, and other natural resources of Salar de Pedernales have been prospected.

== Geography and geomorphology ==
Salar de Pedernales lies in the Diego Almagro municipality, Chañaral province, Atacama Region of Chile. It is 180 km (110 mi) east of Chañaral and is accessible through a dirt road that departs from Chile Route C-173. Covering a surface of 243 square kilometres (94 sq mi) to 335 km^{2} (129 sq mi), Salar de Pedernales is the largest salt flat in the Atacama Region. The salt flat lies east of the Cordillera Domeyko at an elevation of 3,370 m (11,060 ft). Doña Ines mountain lies to its north, Cerro Agua Helada to its east, and Sierra Aragonesa south.

The salt flat has an irregular shape. Most of the surface is gypsum and rock salt watered by brine, with a hydrologically "active" zone in the western part of the salt flat and a less active part at its centre. Surface features of the salt flat include tubes, polygons, pinnacles, and conical mounds formed by salt. The salt flat is zoned, with the central portion containing halite and the marginal ones sulfate. Under the surface lie layers of compacted halite and lagoon sediments. Tilted layers indicate older salt flat surfaces, as Salar de Pedernales has been tilted to the northwest during the Quaternary. Windblown silt and sediment transported by rivers has buried part of the salt flat. Oil seeps out of the salt flat in several places. Wind has formed salt dunes southeast of Salar de Pedernales.

About 0.6 km^{2} (0.23 sq mi) to 1.1 km^{2} (0.42 sq mi) of the salt flat is open water, mostly in its northern part in the form of lagoons. The ponds reach diameters of several metres; the ones in the northeastern sector are the deepest. At the western margin there are shallow freshwater channels bordered with grass. Seepage water from the salt flat has produced dark slope streaks. These been compared to dark slope streaks on Mars, and may constitute a model for the "wet" origin of Martian streaks. South of the salt flat lies the Llano Pedernales, which is covered by waterborne sediments.

=== Prehistoric lake ===
During the late Pleistocene, the climate was much wetter in the Central Andes as part of the Central Andean Pluvial Event, leading to the formation of lakes like Lake Minchin in the Altiplano. This may have raised water levels in Salar de Pedernales by about 30 m (98 ft); carbonates from a highstand have been dated to about 29,730 ± 1,440 years ago. This lake may have covered an area of 540 km^{2} (210 mi^{2}) and left shorelines along the eastern margin of Salar de Pedernales, while rivers formed deltas on its southern side.

=== Watershed ===
The watershed of Salar de Pedernales has an area of 3,596.2 km^{2} (1,388.5 sq mi), with the highest elevations exceeding 6,000 m (20,000 ft) reached at the Sierra Nevada de Lagunas Bravas. The major inflow to Salar de Pedernales comes from Rio Ola, which drains the southern part of the Salar de Pedernales watershed and joins the salt flat at its southeastern end. The Leoncito and Juncalito rivers join it (partly underground) from the east, and its flow peaks during July and August. Other tributaries come from the southwest, east and northwest. To the west, the watershed borders on the Río Salado basin, which drains to the Pacific Ocean. The Rio de la Sal, a tributary of the Rio Salado, almost eroded into the salt flat but current erosion is minimal and the valleys are filling in. Water seeps underground and through an artificial discharge dug in the 1930s from the salt flat into the Rio de la Sal. The water has deposited salt in the valley, forming cascades and terraces. Ludwig Darapsky in 1900 thought that the barrier between the two was a moraine.

== Geology ==
The oldest rocks in the area are the Paleozoic batholiths. In the southern part of the salt flat, they are overlaid by breccias and tuffs of the La Tabla Formation. Both units crop out at the western end of the salt flat. At the northwestern end are several faulted Jurassic rock units, while the northern and eastern side are formed by Oligocene and Miocene volcanic units and volcanoes including large calderas. Among the volcanic rocks are the 16 million years old Los Cristales ignimbrite and the 9 million years old San Andrés ignimbrite. The Jurassic rocks contain ammonite fossils.

Together with the Salar de Atacama and the Salar de Punta Negra, Salar de Pedernales forms one of the pre-Andean basins of the Andes. The local geology is largely hidden below the salt surface and can be discerned mainly through field work and seismic tomography. The Potrerillos thrust-and-fold belt extends below the salt flat. Thrust faults have raised the Paleozoic rocks over more recent units, while normal faults form grabens and raised area under the salt flat. The deformation of the rocks probably took place in the Cretaceous and Paleogene, during the orogeny of the Andes. It caused the upper parts of the Rio Salado watershed to separate from the river, generating Salar de Pedernales which then filled with evaporites. Later, the river recaptured part of its former watershed in the Precordillera.

== Climate and life ==
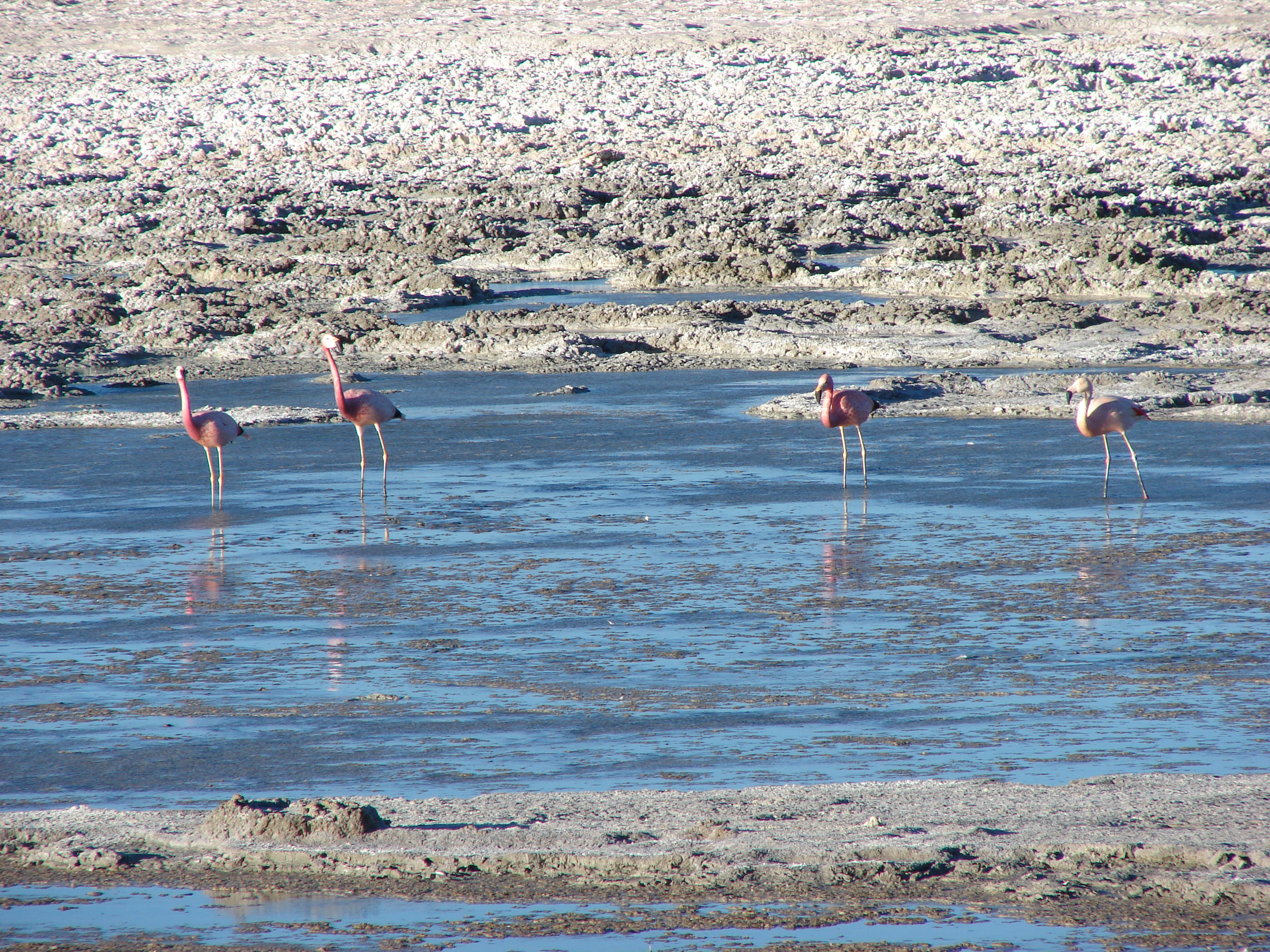
Flamingoes in the salt flat

Salar de Pedernales features a high-desert climate, with mean annual precipitation of 100 mm (3.9 in)–125 mm (4.9 in) and an annual average temperature of 4 °C (39 °F), with high temperature differences between night and day. Salar de Pedernales lies in the transition area between the summer and winter rain region; precipitation originates from the Pacific Ocean in May to June and falls in the form of snow and rain. During summer, occasionally precipitation extends from Argentina to Salar de Pedernales. Estimates of the evaporation of water have a wide range but vastly exceed precipitation.

Vegetation occurs where there is water available, often in the form of wetlands, and consists of cushion plants, grass, trees and tussock grass. Birds include Cormorants, ducks, egrets and flamingos. Crustaceans and lizards and toads have been reported at Salar de Pedernales. (Note: Species include Phoenicoparrus jamesi, Phoenicopterus andinus and Phoenicopterus chilensis among the flamingos, Hyalella fossamancinii and Hyalella kochi among the crustaceans, and Liolaemus nigriceps, Liolaemus isabelae, Liolaemus patriciaiturrae and Liolaemus rosenmanni among the lizards. Other sporadically occurring birds are the upland sandpiper and the hooded siskin. Mammals include the foxes, guanaco, puma, tawny tuco-tuco, vicuña and vizcacha.) The birds nest on the flat. Other organisms in the salar include invertebrates and microorganisms including prokaryotes. The fauna is concentrated along the La Ola river.

== Use ==
=== Prehistoric ===
Animal and freshwater sources close to the salt flat were used by early inhabitants in the region. The earliest human activity has been dated to 11,612–11,201 years ago. Archaeological sites close to the salt flat indicate that it was populated in the early Holocene, (Note: In particular, the outlet of the Quebrada de Pedernales/Pedernales Gorge features 56 sites. Artifacts include rock shelters and other constructions, ceramics and lithic artifacts. The lithic artifacts belong to various regional archaeological traditions.) with sites found at the Quebrada de Pedernales at the southwestern margin, on lacustrine terraces at the eastern margin of the salt flat and along the Ola river. The early habitation has been correlated to the Huentelauquén cultural complex from the Pacific coast; it exploited rodents and birds as food sources and constructed numerous animal traps around Salar de Pedernales. During the middle Holocene, prolonged drought led to the abandonment of the region, until about 3000 years ago. Obsidian findings indicate that Salar de Pedernales was on a trade route leading into the Andes. Later still, the Inca extended part of their road system, which passed on the western side of Salar de Pedernales, to the region and built ceremonial platforms. For some time, Salar de Pedernales may have been a stopping point for caravans.

=== Present-day ===
Beginning in 1927, the Rio Ola was dammed and most of its flow diverted to copper processing plants at Potrerillos and El Salvador. The National Copper Corporation of Chile acquired mining rights at Salar de Pedernales in 1977, and in 2017 created another company that aimed at developing lithium reserves at Salar de Pedernales in cooperation with private companies. Oil wells have been dug in the area, and borate, lithium and potassium deposits occur at the margins of Salar de Pedernales; there is one report of asphalt occurrence. Borate mines at its southwestern margin were active in the second half of the 19th century, but by 1990 had been abandoned. They, along with the flamingo population, form a potential target for tourism. In 2022, Salar de Pedernales was one of the Chilean salars earmarked for lithium mining.

The damming of the river has caused a decline in the water supply to the salt flat and a decline of its vegetation and that of the Quebrada Pedernales. Allegations of damages caused by overexploitation of the salt flat's water resources led to lawsuits against the National Copper Corporation of Chile in the 2020s, which forced the company to develop a wetland management plan for Salar de Pedernales.
