= Liolaemus patriciaiturrae =

Conservation status
- Near Threatened (IUCN 3.1)

Scientific classification
- Kingdom: Animalia
- Phylum: Chordata
- Class: Reptilia
- Order: Squamata
- Suborder: Iguania
- Family: Liolaemidae
- Genus: Liolaemus
- Species: L. patriciaiturrae

Binomial name
- Liolaemus patriciaiturrae Navarro & Núñez, 1993

Species of lizard

Liolaemus patriciaiturrae is a species of lizard in the family Liolaemidae. The species is endemic to Chile.

== Etymology ==
The specific name, patriciaiturrae, is in honor of Chilean herpetologist Patricia Iturra.

== Geographic range ==
L. patriciaiturrae is found in Atacama Region, which is in northern Chile.

== Habitat ==
The preferred natural habitat of L. patriciaiturrae is desert, at altitudes of 2,850–3,800 m (9,350–12,470 ft).

== Description ==
L. patriciaiturrae is one of the largest species in the L. ruibali species group. It has juxtaposed dorsal scales, and it lacks auricular and tympanic scales. Males exhibit a melanic throat and chest.

== Diet ==
L. patriciaiturrae preys upon invertebrates and also eats plant material.

== Reproduction ==
The mode of reproduction of L. patriciaiturrae has been described as viviparous, and as ovoviviparous.
