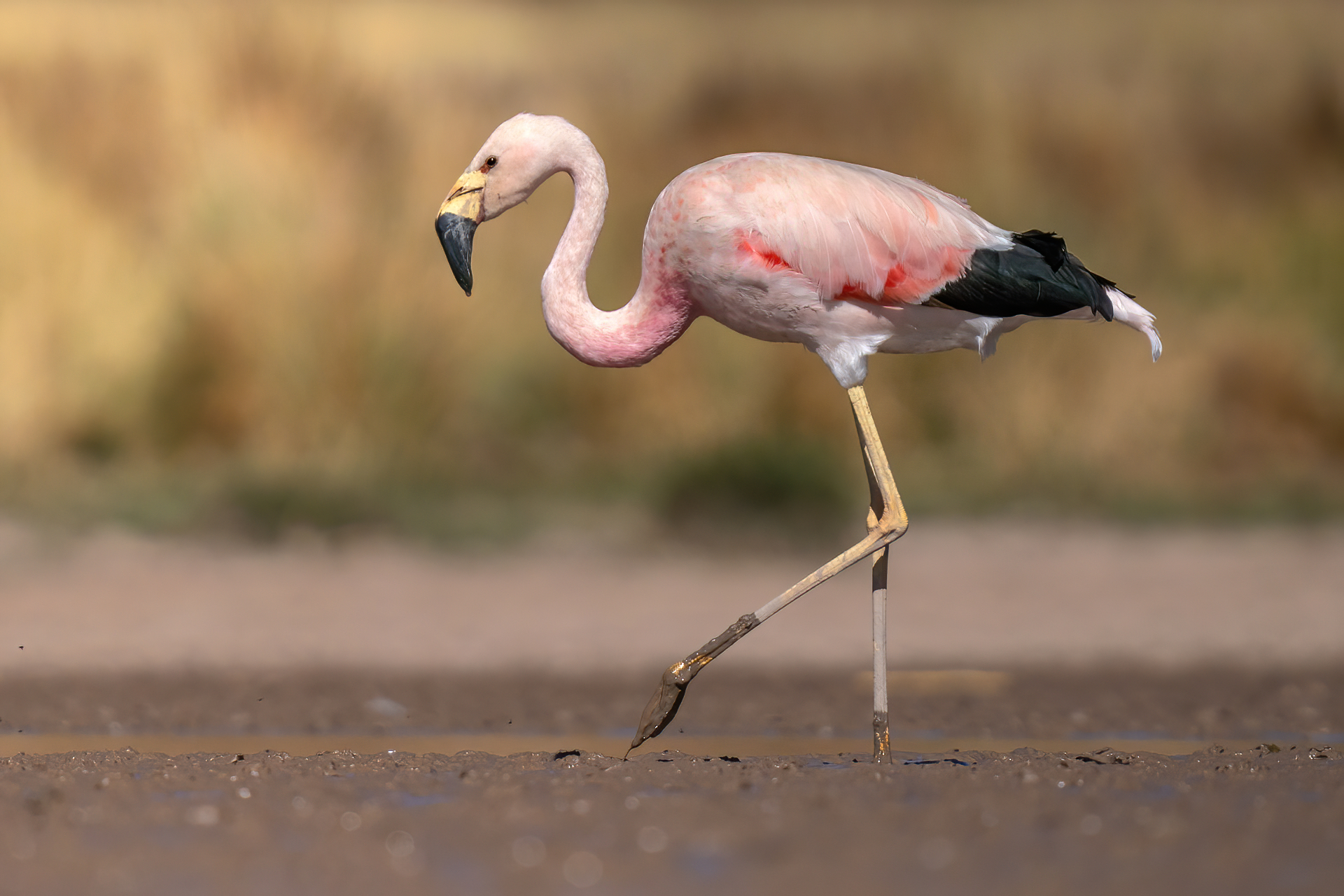
- In Salta, Argentina

Conservation status
- Vulnerable (IUCN 3.1)
- CITES Appendix II

Scientific classification
- Kingdom: Animalia
- Phylum: Chordata
- Class: Aves
- Order: Phoenicopteriformes
- Family: Phoenicopteridae
- Genus: Phoenicoparrus
- Species: P. andinus

Binomial name
- Phoenicoparrus andinus (Philippi, 1854)
- Range map Non-Breeding Year-round Breeding

Synonyms
- Phoenicopterus andinus ssp. andinus Philippi, 1854

= Andean flamingo =

Species of bird

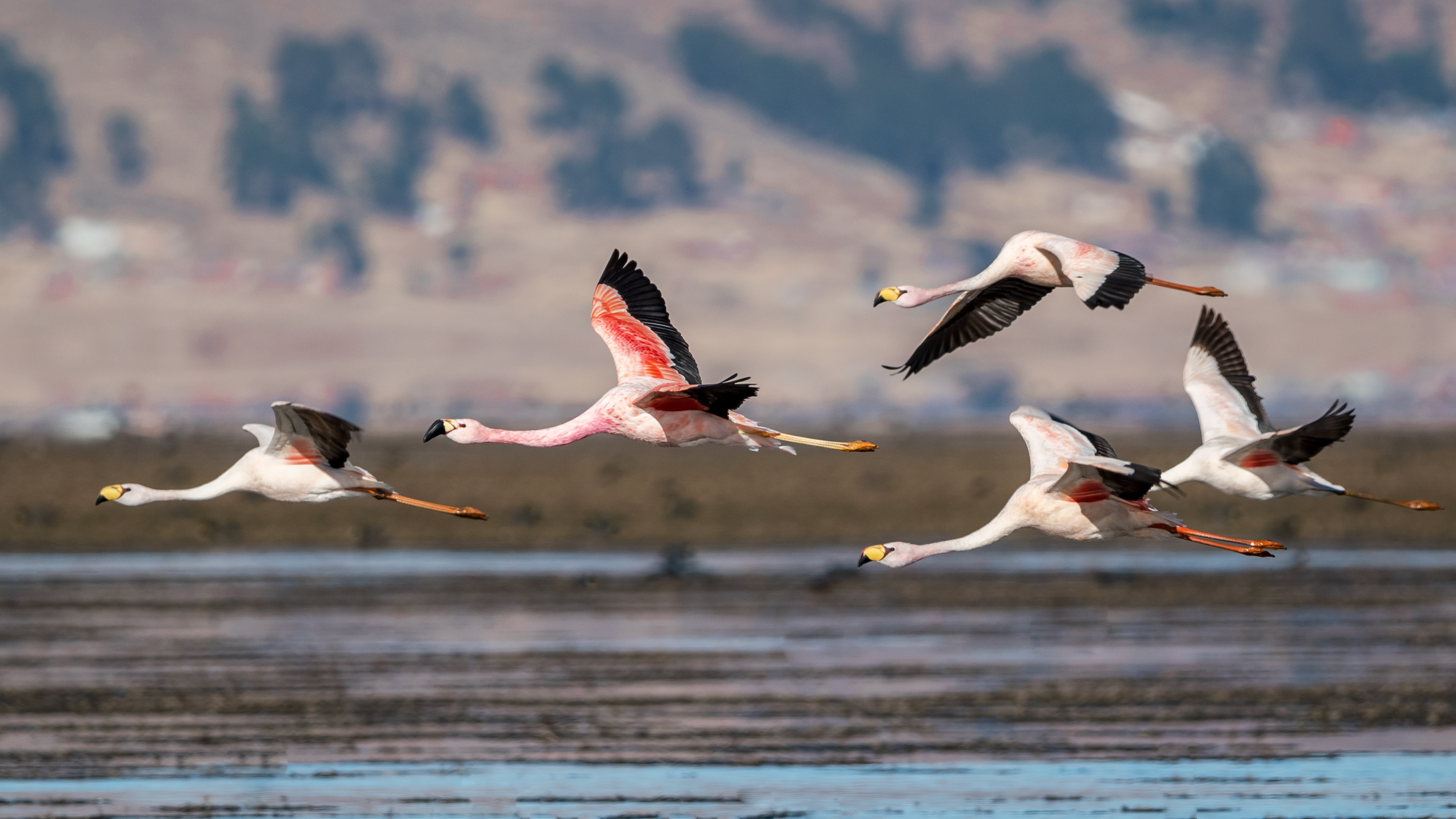
Andean flamingo (center) amidst a flock of James's flamingos, in Potosí, Bolivia

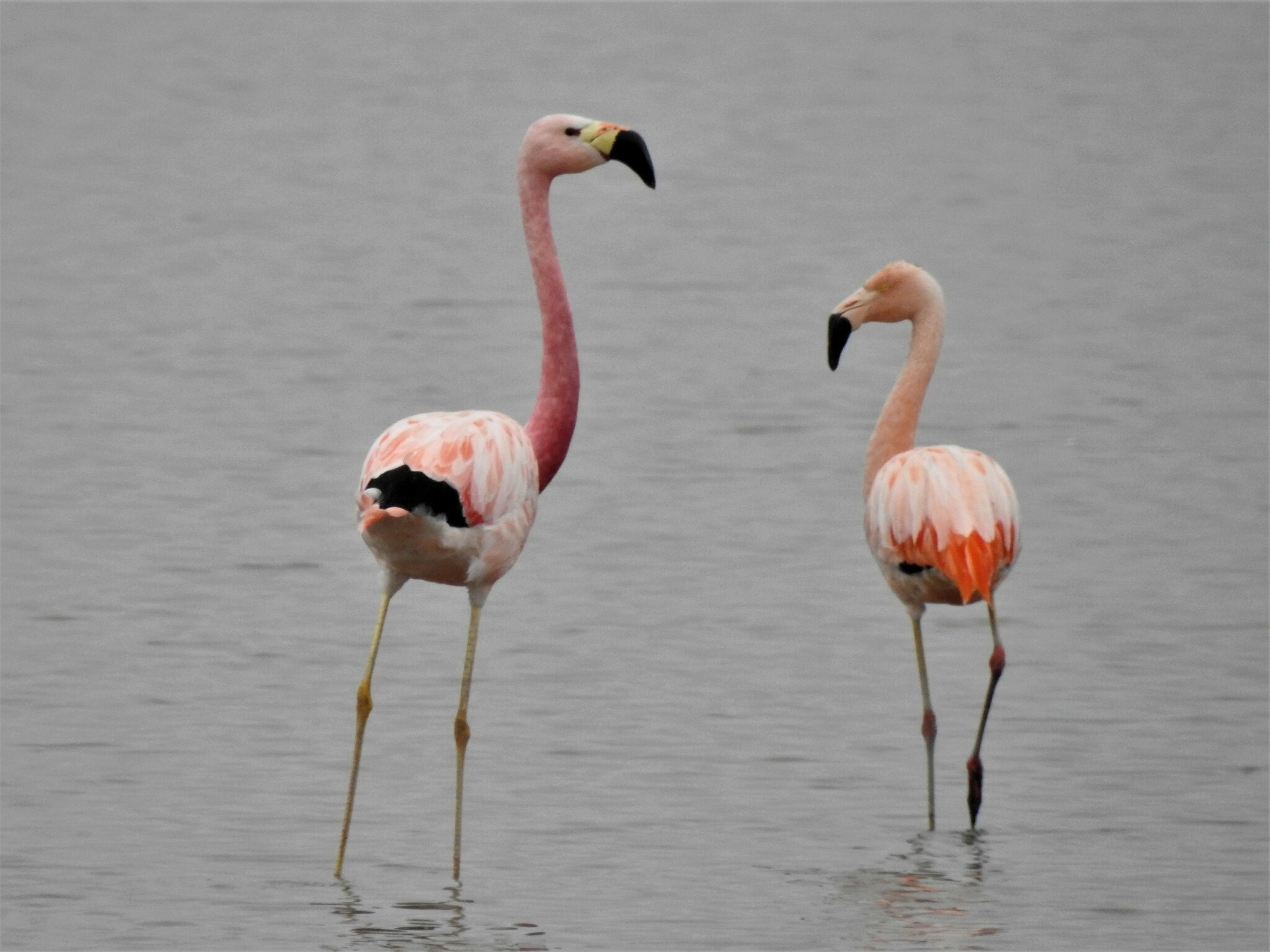
Andean flamingo (left) with a Chilean flamingo (right), in Santa Fe, Argentina

The Andean flamingo (Phoenicoparrus andinus) is a species of flamingo native to the Andes mountains of South America. Until 2014, it was classified in genus Phoenicopterus. It is closely related to James's flamingo, and the two make up the genus Phoenicoparrus. The Chilean flamingo, Andean flamingo, and James' flamingo are all sympatric, and all live in colonies (including shared nesting areas).

== Distribution, habitat, and movements ==
This Andean flamingo is native to the wetlands of the high Andes mountain range from southern Peru to northwestern Argentina and northern Chile. Andean flamingos are migratory, with the ability to travel up to 700 miles in one day. In the summer, they live in salt lakes, and migrate to the lower wetlands for the winter. The cause of this migration from summer to winter is possibly due to the extreme aridity of salt flats during the winter. The path of migration is unknown, but it is thought to occur between the Chilean breeding grounds and the wetlands of central and western Argentina.

Breeding is concentrated in northern Chile, extreme southwestern Bolivia, and northwestern Argentina. During the nonbreeding season, some birds remain around the same wetlands where they bred, but others move to lower elevation wetlands and lakes, including east to the central plains of Argentina, and also north through the Andes to southern Peru.

Vagrant as far north as Conococha in central Peru, to the coast of Peru and northern Chile, to Amazonian Brazil, to southern Argentina, and to coastal southern Brazil.

== Description ==
It is distinguished from other flamingos by its deeper lower mandible and the very long filtering filaments on the maxilla. It is the largest flamingo in the Andes and is one of the two heaviest living flamingos alongside the taller greater flamingo. Reportedly body mass of the Andean flamingo has ranged from 1.5 to 4.9 kg (3.3 to 10.8 lb), height from 1 to 1.4 m (3 ft 3 in to 4 ft 7 in) and wingspan from 1.4 to 1.6 m (4 ft 7 in to 5 ft 3 in).

The flamingo has a pale pink body with brighter upperparts, deep vinaceous-pink lower neck, breast, and wing coverts. It is the only flamingo species with yellow legs and three-toed feet. Its bill is pale yellow near the skull, but black for the majority of its length, and curves downward. Its lower mandible is less apparent than those of the genus Phoenicopterus.

=== Plumages ===
Juveniles present a uniformly pale gray plumage. It is often duskier on the head and neck. Coverts and scapulars can have darker brown centers. Meanwhile, adults are overall pale pink, with the feathers on the lower neck and chest being much brighter pink; coverts may be similarly bright pink. Head and upper neck may be a brighter pink than the rest of the body, which can appear almost white with only a pale pink wash, but head and upper neck never as bright as the lower neck and breast. Primaries and secondaries black, which when wings are folded, appear as bold black triangle that is not obscured by other feathers.

=== Fossil record ===
Fossils attributed to Andean Flamingo have been found at the Salar de Atacama border and roughly date to the Early Formative period, approximately 3,000 to 2,200 BP. These fossils date to a period consistent with the onset of modern climate conditions that the species now inhabits.

== Behavior ==
=== Feeding ===
These flamingos are filter feeders and their diet ranges over the entire spectrum of available foods, from fish to invertebrates, from vascular plants to microscopic algae.

The flamingos feed from the bottom layer of the lake for small particles, mainly diatoms. They have a deep-keeled bill; the upper mandible is narrower than the lower, creating a gape on the dorsal surface of the bill. The bill morphology facilitates feeding of diatoms through inertial impaction. This mechanism entails that food particles denser than water, such as diatoms, would impact the filtering surface in the bill, causing water to flow out of the mouth and leaving diatoms in the flamingo's bill. The flamingos forage in shallow salty waters for resources. They exhibit the most flexible foraging pattern compared to that of the Chilean and James's flamingos.

When grouping the Andean flamingos with Chilean flamingos or James's flamingos, Andean flamingos adopt the foraging patterns of the species with which it is grouped. Thus, when grouped with Chilean flamingos, they use a moderate and deep foraging depth strategy more than or the same as expected. If they are grouped with James's flamingos, they adopt the edge and the shallow foraging strategy. However, the overall foraging behavior of Andean flamingos remains unclear.

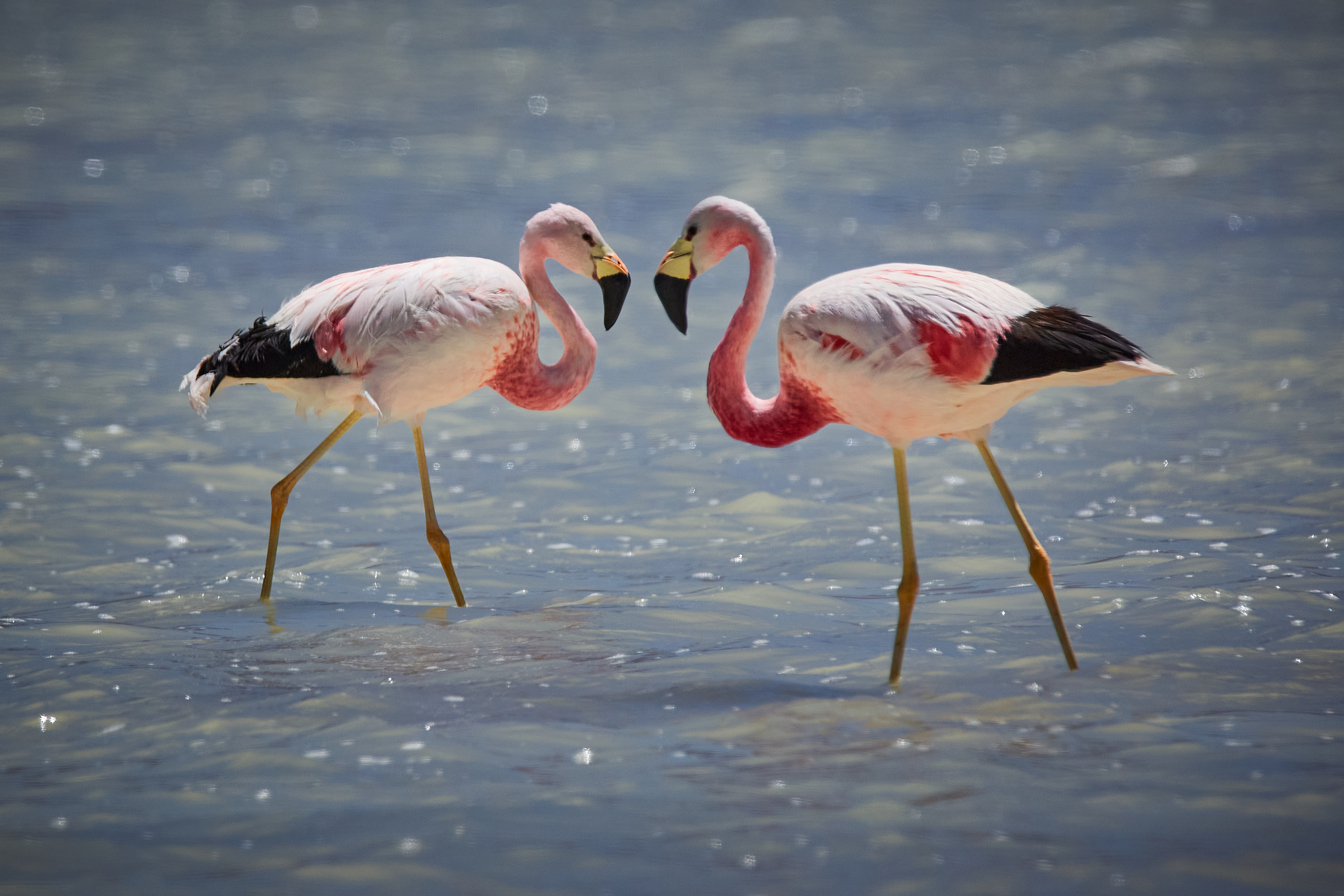
In Bolivia

=== Vocalization ===
Very poorly known; the available recordings fall into three distinct call types, but specific information on function lacking. Peep: a surprisingly high-pitched (c 2 kHz), short (c 0.1–0.2 s), clear note that sounds rather Passerine-like. Most often given in a quick series that slightly descends, but sometimes also singly. Quack: a brief, rough nasal quack or honk-like note that can be given individually or in series. Lower-pitched and shorter in duration than the analogous call in Chilean Flamingo, but slightly higher-pitched than in James's Flamingo. Often heard in flight. Chuckle: a quiet, conversational call made up of short, low-pitched quack-like notes. Lower-pitched and less nasal than the Quack call, and typically given in a faster series.

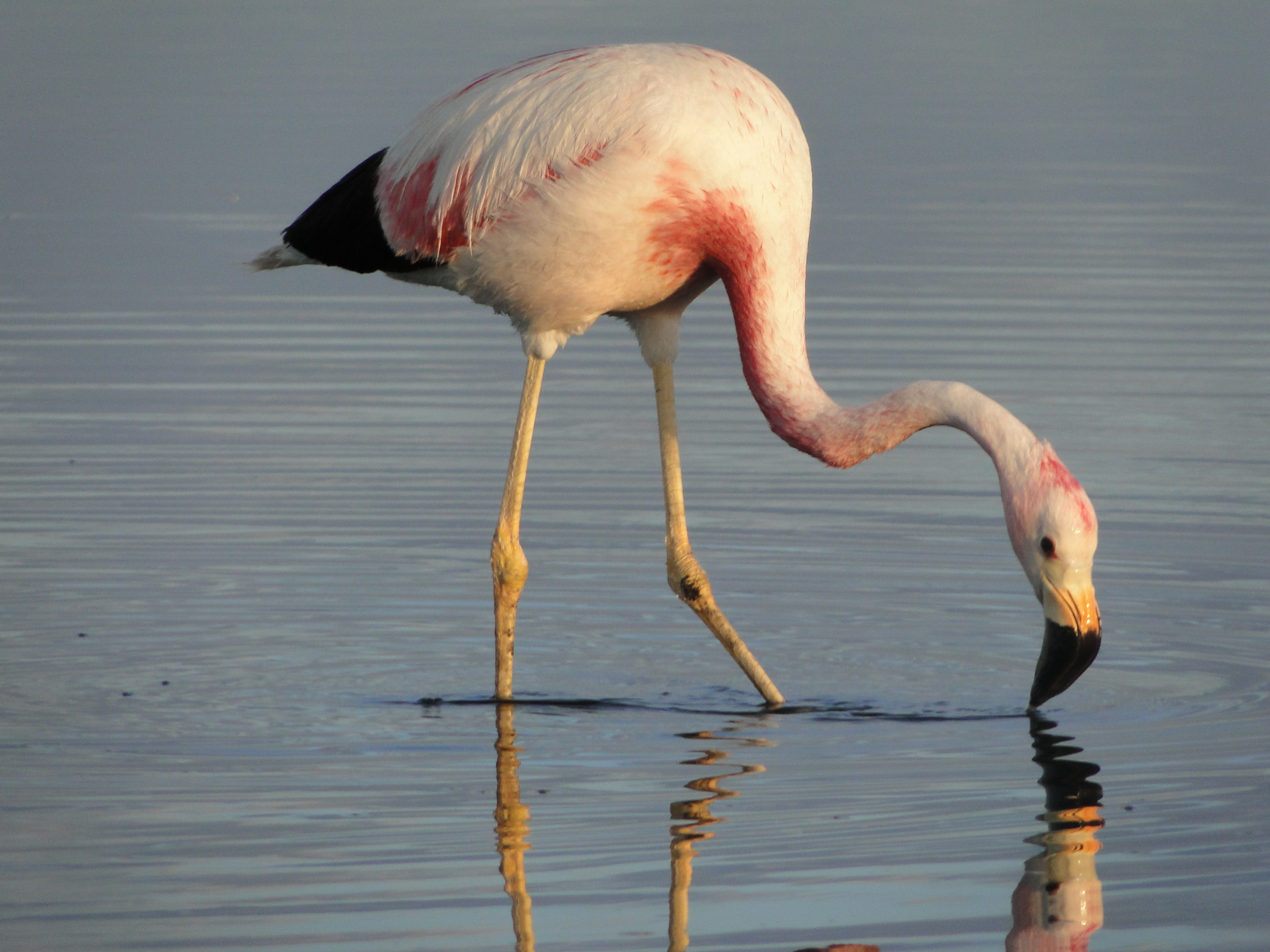
Andean flamingo foraging in a lake in Salar de Atacama, Chile

== Status and conservation ==
The Andean flamingo is considered a vulnerable species due to the mining business and human disturbances causing changes in its habitat.

=== Mining ===
The Andean flamingo's habitat is constantly changing due to human activity. The primary threat to the flamingo population is mining excavations, which occur at the end of the summer rainy season. The habitat of the Andean flamingo is rich in boron compounds, specifically borax. Borax is fairly toxic at high dosages to animals such as the Andean flamingo, but not to humans. Studies testing the effects of borax exposure in animals show that excess boron causes skeletal malformations, cardiovascular defects, and degeneration of testes. Borax is a derivative of boric acid; a study comparing the toxicology of borates determined that salts of boric acid produce comparable effects. A study on the mining environment determined as little as 5 g of borax can produce adverse effects in animal populations, but human workers remain unaffected at these levels. Therefore, the miners remain unaffected while the animals suffer from developmental and reproductive toxicity.

A study on Salinas Lake in Peru showed that mining companies have established themselves adjacent to the flamingos' nesting sites, and some mining is performed near flamingo breeding grounds and feeding sites. Flamingos abandoned their nesting sites if mining was initiated after the establishment of nesting colonies and in close proximity. An increase of hydrocarbon exploration resulted in a decreased success rate for breeding. Less than 1% of the flamingos observed were juveniles. The decreased reproductive success may be due to borax exposure or to an altered environment caused by bulldozers disturbing the lake bed. Mining creates a muddy environment, which entraps flamingos, thus increasing mortality. Surveys conducted on residents near the mining activities report sightings of dead flamingos exhumed by the bulldozers.

The extraction process also affects the water availability. Andean flamingos filter surface water for food, but borax mining pollutes this water. Along with the pollution, the extractions expedite the removal of lake moisture. By limiting the amount of water in the lake, mining companies can increase visibility, thus contributing to more optimal mining. A study comparing the correlation between water availability and flamingo population determined that the number of flamingos was strongly correlated to the proportion of water in the lake. With an insufficient food supply and a disturbed habitat, the decrease in offspring seems inevitable.

In Argentina, the rarest species of flamingo is primarily found in northern provinces (Salta, Catamarca, and Jujuy) during warmer months, as well as in low-lying areas of the central region, mainly Córdoba and Santa Fe. The National Mining Secretariat reports 38 lithium projects across the country, with 17 situated in the vast salt flats of Salta province.

Biologists and conservationists have raised concerns about the negative impacts of lithium brine extraction on areas where these birds reproduce and feed. This species, part of the flamingo family alongside the Andean and James's flamingos, has been classified as "vulnerable" by the International Union for Conservation of Nature.

=== Human disturbance ===
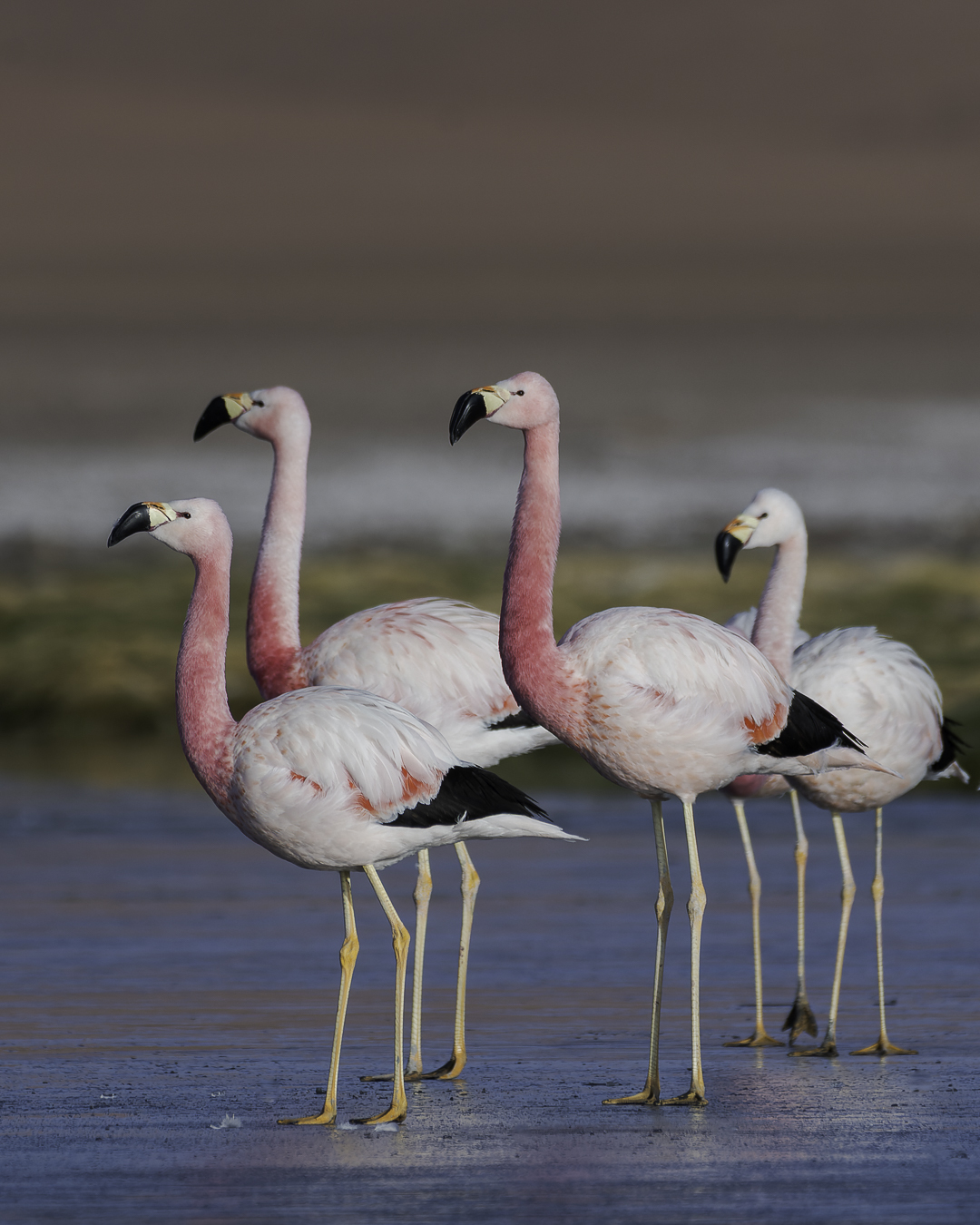
Group in El Loa, Chile

Not only are the flamingos' offspring numbers diminished by mining activities, but they are also affected by the egg collection by locals. This illegal hunting has increased over time due to an increase in international demand for flamingo eggs. Poaching is conducted by organized groups within Chile; the group members trap the flamingos and export them to Europe, the United States, and other overseas destinations. The exportation process is conducted mainly in the Altiplano, which is an area that has deep cultural roots in egg poaching. During the reproductive season, local families also take eggs from flamingo nests. The removal of eggs can disturb the nesting process and cause the flamingo to abandon its nest, even if some eggs remain. Egg removal might be acceptable if the local populations were malnourished, but studies on the diets of the local people show no protein deficiency. In the area of study, the common people raise llamas and alpacas, which offer a higher content of protein than flamingo eggs.

Alongside mining activities, unregulated tourism has taken its toll on the flamingos' habitat. Over time, numerous peat bogs have developed throughout the land. These bogs gradually build up and begin to overflow into the lake. When the bogs enter the lake, they decrease the surface area of the water and prevent the flamingos from entering the lake to feed. As a result of the mining and the tourism, new infrastructure, such as highways, are being built into the Andes. Highways now run alongside the flamingos' habitat. With the addition of these roads, accessibility to the flamingos' habitat increases, leading to more commercial mining and tourism, which in turn results in detrimental effects to the Andean flamingo population. The development of new infrastructure has caused severe fragmentation of the lake, diminishing the biodiversity, and increasing the possibility of extinction for all species.

The demand for surface and underground water, energy production, and transportation, as well as unregulated tourism, have all increased in the last two decades. These increases were documented to be most significant in Chile, the main location for Andean flamingo breeding colonies. As a consequence, these areas are concentrated with toxic compounds due to mineral and hydrocarbon exploration. Since the 1980s, the number of successful breeding colonies and the total production of chicks of Andean flamingos declined. As a result, the Andean flamingo is a threatened species.

=== Conservation plans ===
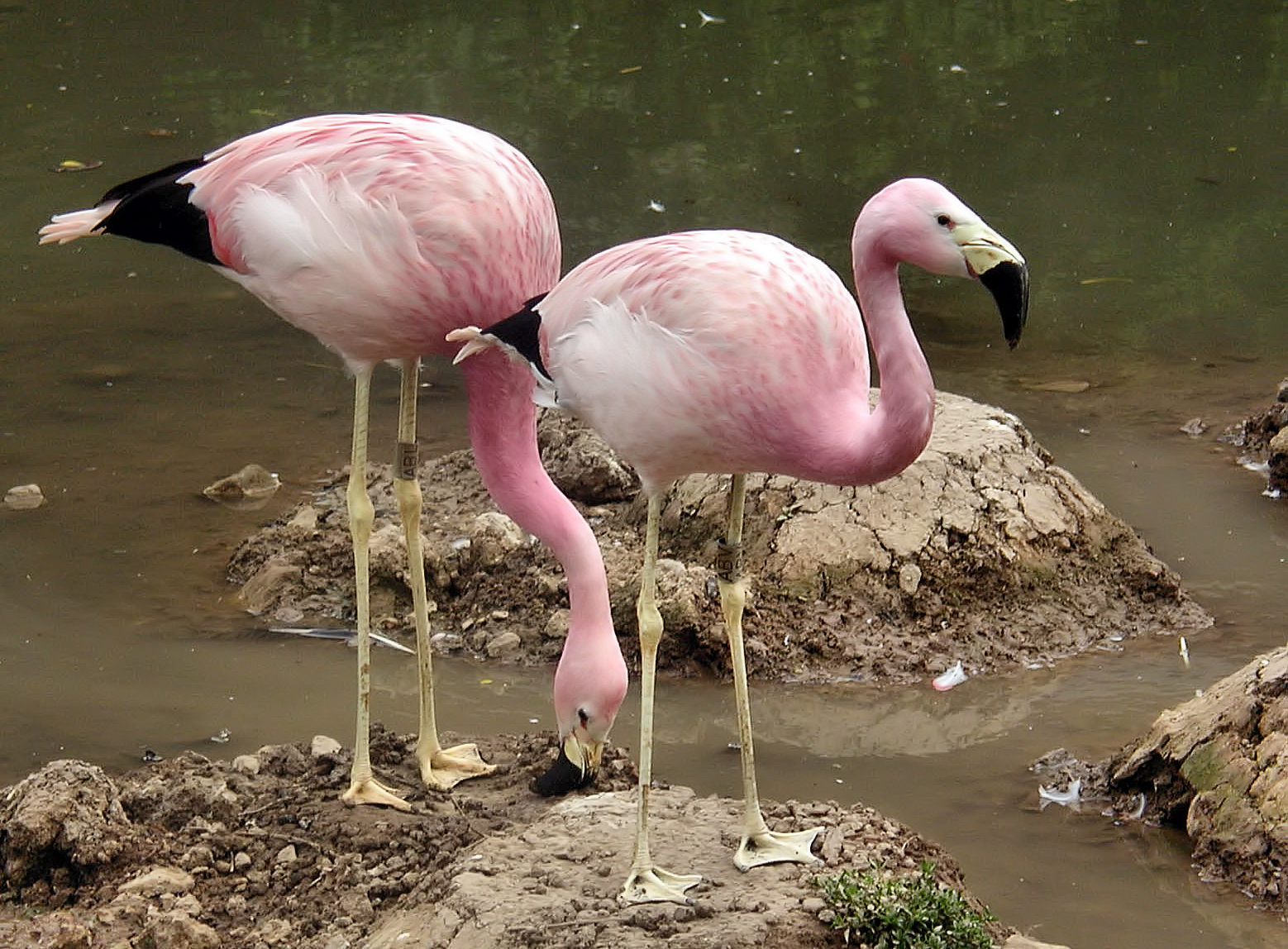
At WWT Slimbridge, Gloucestershire

According to the International Union for Conservation of Nature and Natural Resources, the Andean flamingo is an "insufficiently known species". Thus, despite being negatively affected for at least the previous two decades, it was finally declared endangered in September 2010. In this announcement, it was stated that this flamingo would be protected under the Endangered Species Act of 1973. Most of the areas in which the flamingos reside, both in the summer and the winter, have been covered by the implementation of national parks. However, these parks are absent in habitats incurring changes. Thus, the main breeding grounds are still susceptible to outside disturbances that decrease the population of the flamingos. Because the Andean flamingo is a recent addition to the endangered species list, few plans have been implemented to protect their species. However, the National Institution of Natural Resources (http://www.nri.org/) is currently developing a plan. This group is working with conservationists to find a way to solve the problems of borate extraction and egg collecting and poaching. The plan consists of an environmental education strategy to inform businessmen, workers, villagers, and any other people who pose as a threat to the flamingos. Local authorities in the Salinas Lake district have created an outpost to prevent illicit actions and to find possible solutions to present problems. Creation of national parks has decreased the egg collecting; however, environmental education will be necessary to eliminate this activity.

The Flamingo Specialist Group, established in 1971, is actively trying to inform the public on the vulnerability of flamingos. They produce an annual newsletter to tell readers the current status of several species. In 2000, this group conducted a census that revealed a total population less than 34,000 Andean flamingos, giving them the label of most rare species. Recently, this group has joined sides with the International Union for Conservation of Nature to create an action plan for the flamingos. A meeting was held in Miami, Florida, in 2000 to develop a group to control an action place to protect the six species and subspecies of flamingos.

Under the auspices of the Convention on Migratory Species of Wild Animals, also known as the Bonn Convention, the Memorandum of Understanding (MoU) on the Conservation of High Andean Flamingos and their Habitats was concluded and came into effect on 4 December 2008. The MoU covers Argentina, Bolivia, Chile, and Peru. As of August 2012, Bolivia, Chile, and Peru have signed the MoU. The MoU aims to improve the conservation status of the species and their habitats through coordinated and concerted actions across the range.

== Gallery ==
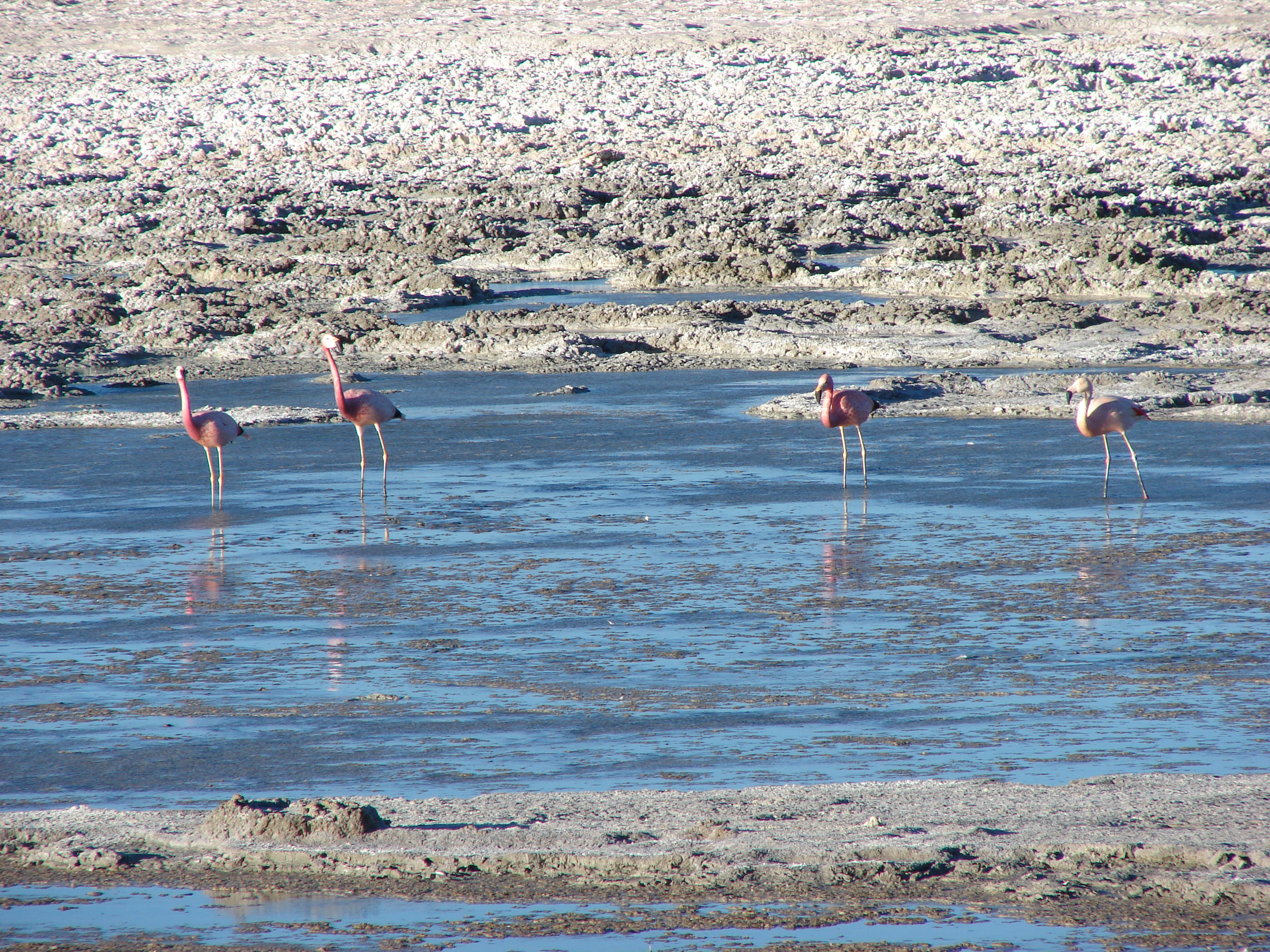
Group of Andean flamingos in the Salar de Pedernales in the Atacama Region of Chile

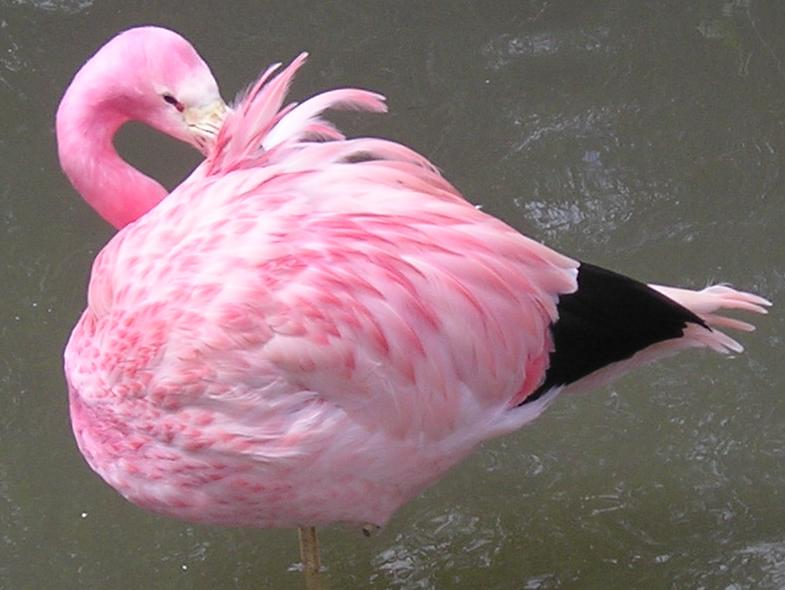
Andean flamingo at Slimbridge WWT, England

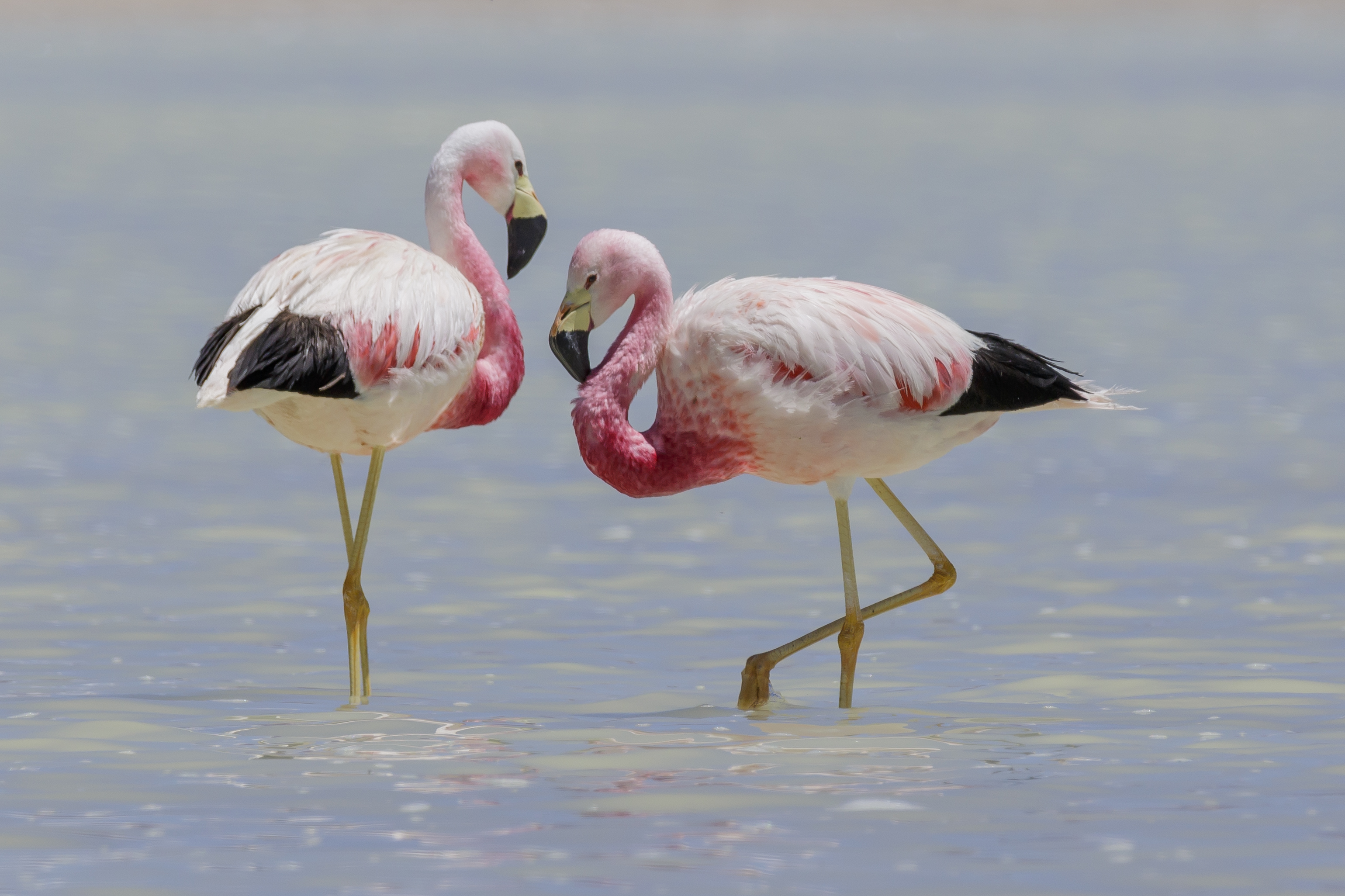
Reserva Nacional de Fauna Andina Eduardo Avaroa, Chile
