= Central Andean Pluvial Event =

Climate event 18,000 and 9,700 years before present

The Central Andean Pluvial Event is a two-stage climate oscillation in the Central Andes between 18,000 and 9,700 years before present. The first, wetter episode occurred 17,500-15,900 years ago; the second was drier and continued into the early Holocene (until 9,700-8,500 years ago). During this climate oscillation, Lake Tauca formed in the Altiplano and the climate became moister and more conducive to vegetation development.

== Chronology and causes ==
The CAPE is associated with the formation of Lake Tauca in the Altiplano. During this epoch, major environmental changes occurred in the Atacama as precipitation increased between 18° and 25° degrees south. In some areas, oases formed in the desert and human settlement began. The CAPE chronology is often subdivided into two phases. The first is wetter and begins in the late glacial (17,500-15,900 years ago); the second is drier and continued into the early Holocene (until 9,700-8,500 years ago). Published start and end dates vary by study. The dry period separating them coincides with the Ticaña lowstand. The second phase of the Central Andean Pluvial Event has been subdivided further into a wetter earlier and a drier later subphase. During the Coipasa lake cycle, only summer precipitation increased and the increase may have focused on the southern Altiplano (arriving there from the Gran Chaco); the main Tauca cycle may have been accompanied by precipitation from the northeast and a simultaneous increase of summer and winter precipitation. A glacial advance in the Turbio valley (a feeder of the Elqui River) between 17,000 and 12,000 years ago has been attributed to the Central Andean Pluvial Event. Other indicators point to dry conditions/lack of glacier advances in central Chile and the central Puna during the highstand of Lake Tauca, glaciers had already retreated from their maximum positions by the time it began and the Central Andean Pluvial Event may not have been synchronous between the southern Altiplano and the southern and northern Atacama.

Many explanations link the CAPE to changes in atmospheric circulation during Heinrich event 1, which would have increased moisture transport onto the Altiplano (for example via shifts in the Bolivian High (Note: The Bolivian high is an anticyclone which steers moist air onto the Altiplano.) and the summer monsoon) that increased transport of easterly moisture into the Altiplano and a strengthening of the South American Summer Monsoon due to a decrease in the cross-equatorial transport of heat. Earlier highstands of Altiplano lakes may also correlate to earlier Heinrich events. Increased cloud cover probably increased the effective precipitation by reducing evaporation rates. In contrast, insolation rates do not appear to be linked to lake-level highstands in the Altiplano; the lake expansion occurred when summer insolation was low although recently an insolation maximum between 26,000 and 15,000 years ago has been correlated to the Tauca stage. The humidity above the lake has been estimated at 60%, taking into account the oxygen-18 content of carbonates deposited by the lake. Just like the Lake Tauca highstand may have coincided with the first Heinrich event, the Younger Dryas may be associated with the Coipasa highstand, one of the Central Andean Pluvial Events with the Antarctic Cold Reversal and the second Central Andean Pluvial Event although the Younger Dryas ended two millennia before the CAPE. The second CAPE was caused either by changes in the South American monsoon or by changes in the atmospheric circulation over the Pacific Ocean, and its end has been attributed to a warming North Atlantic drawing the ITCZ northward.

Increased precipitation during the Tauca phase was probably triggered by the southern movement of the ITCZ and the strengthening of the South America monsoon, possibly caused by chilling in the northern hemisphere and North Atlantic, along with higher water temperatures off Northeastern Brazil. Combined with a southern shift of high pressure zones, increased moisture during late glacial times would have flowed from the Amazon. This change, which occurred from 17,400 to 12,400 years or 18,000 to 11,000 BP, is recorded in Bolivian Chaco and Brazilian cave records. Some 20th century phases of higher water levels in Lake Titicaca have been correlated with episodes of increased snow cover on Northern Hemisphere continents; this may constitute an analogy to conditions during the Lake Tauca phase. The Tauca phase may have been triggered by the southern shift of tropical atmospheric circulation and a weakening of the Atlantic meridional overturning circulation that decreased northward heat transport. An intensification and southward shift of the South Atlantic Convergence Zone (Note: The South Atlantic Convergence Zone is a rainfall belt over central and southern Brazil during southern hemisphere summer.) may have contributed to the precipitation increase but not all records agree.

Another theory posits that vegetation changes and lake development would have decreased the albedo of the Altiplano, resulting in warming and moisture advection of moisture towards the Altiplano, but such positive feedback mechanisms were considered questionable in a 1998 study. Persistent La Niña climatic conditions may have contributed to the lake's filling and also to the onset of the first CAPE. Conversely, a global climatic warming and a northward shift of the monsoon occurred around 14,500 years ago, increased occurrence of El Niño and the northward shift of the ITCZ accompanied the Ticaña lowstand. The ideal conditions for the development of paleolakes in the Altiplano do not appear to exist during maximum glaciation or warm interglacial periods.

== Climate and context ==
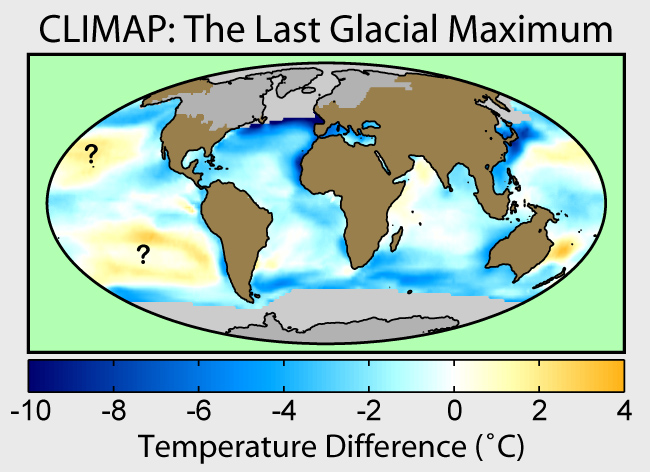
Last Glacial Maximum sea water temperature map

There are few reconstructions of how the climate looked before and after the Lake Tauca highstand. One estimate suggests that summer precipitation would need to increase by about 315 ± 45 millimetres (12.4 ± 1.8 in) and temperatures fall by about 3 °C (5.4 °F) for Lake Tauca to form. According to a 1985 estimate, increased precipitation of 200 millimetres per year (7.9 in/year) would be needed; the estimate was subsequently revised to 300 millimetres per year (12 in/year). With a 5 to 7 °C (9.0 to 12.6 °F) temperature decrease, a 20–75% increase in precipitation would be required to form the lake. Research in 2013 indicated that the climate at the Tunupa volcano (in the centre of Lake Tauca) was about 6 to 7 °C (11 to 13 °F) colder than present, with rainfall estimated at 320 to 600 millimetres (13 to 24 in). A 2018 estimate supported by 2020 research envisages a temperature decrease of 2.9 ± 0.2 °C (5.22 ± 0.36 °F) and a mean precipitation 130% higher than today, about 900 ± 200 millimetres per year (35.4 ± 7.9 in/year); this precipitation increase was concentrated on the eastern side of the catchment of Lake Tauca while the southernmost watershed was almost as dry as present-day. In a coupled glacier-lake model, temperatures were conditionally estimated at 5.7 ± 1.1 °C (10.3 ± 2.0 °F) lower than today. In the southern Altiplano, precipitation exceeded 500 millimetres (20 in) during this epoch. In the central Altiplano, precipitation was 1.5 to three times higher than today. In and around the Arid Diagonal, precipitation doubled from 300 millimetres per year (12 in/year) to 600 millimetres per year (24 in/year). Temperatures in the central Altiplano were about 6.5 °C (11.7 °F) lower. Some estimates suggest precipitation around the lake increased by as much as nine-fold. Today, the average temperature at stations at an altitude of 3,770 metres (12,370 ft) is 9 °C (48 °F).

=== Glaciation ===
The humid period that formed Lake Tauca is associated with a glacier expansion (Note: The so-called ‘II moraine' stage in northern Chile and the Chacabaya glacial advance may be contemporaneous with Lake Tauca.) in the Andes between 18° and 24° south latitude during the Late Glacial Maximum. The correlation is most clear in southern Bolivia (Tunupa), while farther south (Tocorpuri, Llano de Chajnantor, El Tatio) evidence is less clear. Moisture from Lake Tauca might have enhanced glacier growth at Sajama, Tunupa and other mountains close to the lake.

=== Related events ===
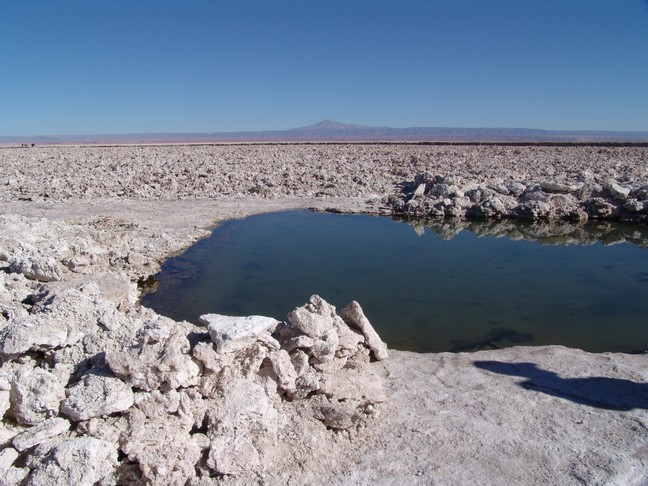
Some lake water highstands of Salar de Atacama are associated with Lake Tauca's main highstand phase

During the Tauca phase, Lake Titicaca rose to 3,815 metres (12,516 ft)-3,825 metres (12,549 ft) altitude. The highstand, in 13,180 ± 130 BP, is contemporaneous with the Tauca III phase. Titicaca's water level then dropped during the Ticaña phase and probably rose again during the Coipasa. and its water became less saline. The Lake Tauca highstands left terraces at the southern and eastern shores of Lake Titicaca (Note: The name "Lake Minchin" is often used for the largest lake on the Altiplano, however the highstand at the end of the Pleistocene is called Tauca.) and, together with older stages of higher water levels, formed the pampas around Titicaca.

Lake Titicaca probably overflowed on the south between 26,000 and 15,000 BP, adding water to Lake Tauca. Titicaca's outflow, the Rio Desaguadero, may have been eight times that of today. This was not the first time Lake Titicaca rose; Pleistocene lake-level rises are known as Mataro, Cabana, Ballivian and Minchin. The overflow from Lake Titicaca into the southern Altiplano was possible for the last 50,000 years; this might explain why there is little evidence of large lakes in the southern Altiplano in the time before 50,000 years ago.

Lakes in the Atacama also formed or expanded during this interval, (Note: The associated Central Andean Pluvial Event coincided with the formation of Lake Tauca) and salt flats experienced more frequent flooding. Lejía Lake began rising after 11,480 ± 70 BP, and in Salar Aguas Calientes high-water levels lasted until 8,430 ± 75 BP. Highstands in Laguna Khota occurred around 12,500 and 11,000 BP. The formation of a lake at Salar de Llamara and some Salar de Atacama highstands are associated with Lake Tauca, the Minchin humid period and the Coipasa highstand. Traces of the Tauca and Coipasa humid episodes have been found at Salar Pedernales and in the Rio Turbio valley, respectively; past 26° south latitude. Between 23,000 and 14,600 a lake formed at Laguna Pozuelos. Lake Tauca's highstand correlates with river terraces in Peru's Pisco River; terraces dated 24,000–16,000 BP in its tributary, the Quebrada Veladera; enlarged drainage systems in the Quebrada Veladera; a humid period at Lake Junin, and new soil formation in the pampas south of the Quinto River in Argentina and in the Ahorcado river valley in Peru. During the second Central Andean Pluvial Event, soils also formed in a wetland of northern Chile. The CAPE climate change also formed ecosystems inhabited by now-extinct megafauna.

During the Tauca phase, water levels in Laguna Miscanti were higher than today; shorelines formed from an event in Ch'iyar Quta and Lake Tuyajto; saline lakes formed in the Lipez area, and water levels rose in the Guayatayoc-Salinas Grandes basin, during the Coipasa stage in Lake Chungará, (Note: Lake Chungará formed between 17,000 and 8,000 years ago when a giant landslide blocked the Rio Lauca, and thus the Tauca-era climate might not be recorded in it.) in Laguna de Suches in Peru and lakes at Uturuncu and Lazufre. Some Atacama Altiplano lake levels increased by 30 to 50 metres (98 to 164 ft), Lake levels rose in Laguna Mar Chiquita, Laguna La Salada Grande in the Cordillera Oriental and Salina de Bebedero in Argentina. Higher lake levels have been found at the same time in other parts of the Altiplano and areas of the Atacama above 3,500 metres (11,500 ft).

The Tauca period has been linked to a downward shift of vegetation zones and increased discharge in rivers draining to the Pacific. Evidence exists at the Quebrada Mani archeological site for a higher water supply 16,400–13,700 years ago. During the Tauca, greater flow occurred in rivers in the Atacama region as well as a higher groundwater recharge; more precipitation fell in the Rio Salado valley; flooding in the Río Paraguay-Parana basin and the contribution from Andean rivers such as the Rio Salado and Rio Bermejo increased; the excavation of the Lluta River Valley, Quebrada de Purmamarca and the Colca Canyon may have been aided by an increased water supply, river incision changed, river terraces formed in the Lomas de Lachay, erosion occurred along the Pilcomayo, and an increase in Pacific plankton was probably linked to increased runoff (and an increased nutrient supply) from the Andes. Strong gully erosion took place and alluvial fans formed in Bolivian valleys. Groundwater-fed wetlands developed in the Cordillera de la Costa, and valleys and large salt caves formed northwest of the Salar de Atacama.

Glaciers advanced in parts of the Andes, including the Cordillera de Cochabamba. An ice cap formed over the Los Frailes ignimbrite plateau; its demise after the end of the Lake Tauca period may have allowed magma to ascend and form the Nuevo Mundo volcano. Moraine formed at Hualca Hualca and Nevado de Chañi where glaciers expanded; the Choqueyapu II glacier in the Eastern Cordillera advanced; moraines formed from glacial advances in Argentina (including the Sierra de Santa Victoria); basal sliding glaciers formed at Sajama; periglacial phenomena became more significant in northwestern Argentina from increased moisture supply; glaciers and probably also rock glaciers grew at Sillajhuay; snow cover in the Atacama Altiplano increased to about 10% above 4,000 metres (13,000 ft) elevation; glacier advanced in the northern Atacama. A glacial advance in central Chile around 15,000 years ago, also associated with increased precipitation and the Lake Tauca period, was probably triggered by tropical circulation changes. At Lake Titicaca, glacial tongues approached the shore. The equilibrium line altitude of glaciers in the dry Andes decreased by 700 to 1,000 metres (2,300 to 3,300 ft).

Landslide activity decreased in northwestern Argentina but increased at Aricota, Locumba River, Peru; alluvial fans were active in the Cordillera Oriental of Peru; tufa deposition began in the Cuncaicha cave north of Coropuna; the climate grew wetter over the southern Amazon as evidenced in Brazilian cave deposits; precipitation and forest cover in Pampa del Tamarugal increased with an interruption ("Late Pleistocene Pampa del Tamarugal desiccation event") during the Ticaña lowstand; the vegetation limit in the Atacama desert descended towards the coast; groundwater discharge in the Atacama increased; wetlands developed at Salar de Punta Negra; the "Pica glass" formed in the Atacama as a consequence of increased vegetation and the occurrence of wildfires in this vegetation and plant pathogens such as rust fungi were more diverse than today. Prosopis tamarugo grew at higher altitude thanks to a better water supply; and vegetation coverage increased in the Atacama Altiplano. The well dated record of Lake Tauca has been used to correlate climatic events elsewhere in the region.
