= Liolaemus isabelae =

Conservation status
- Endangered (IUCN 3.1)

Scientific classification
- Kingdom: Animalia
- Phylum: Chordata
- Class: Reptilia
- Order: Squamata
- Suborder: Iguania
- Family: Liolaemidae
- Genus: Liolaemus
- Species: L. isabelae

Binomial name
- Liolaemus isabelae Navarro & Núñez, 1993

Synonyms
- Liolaemus nigroventrolateralis Ortiz, 1994

Species of lizard

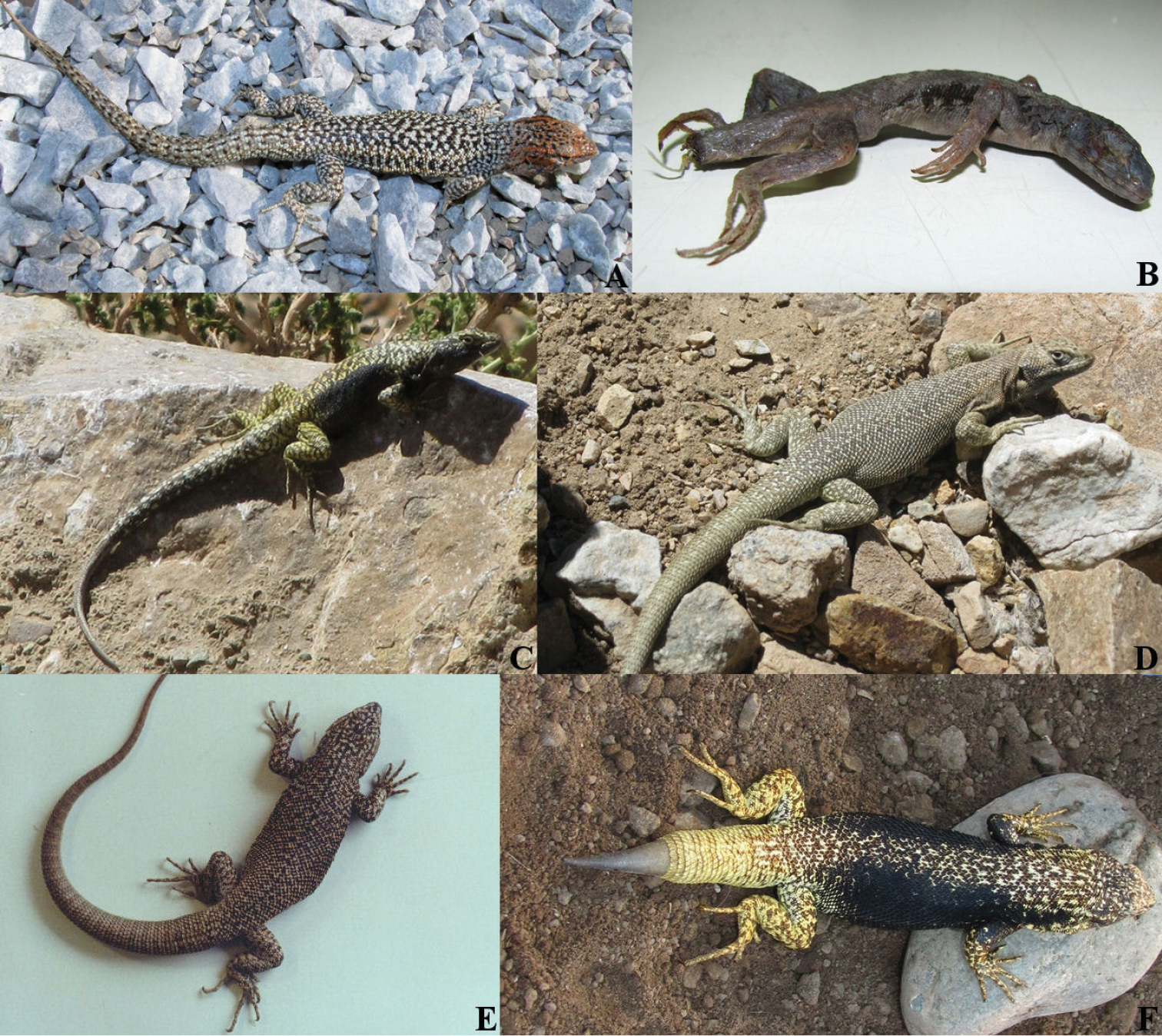
Pictures of Liolaemus isabelae

Liolaemus isabelae is a species of lizard in the family Liolaemidae. The species is endemic to Chile.

== Etymology ==
The specific name, isabelae, is in honor of Isabel Yermany who is the wife of senior describer José Navarro.

== Geographic range ==
L. isabelae is found in Atacama Region, which is in northern Chile.

== Habitat ==
The preferred natural habitat of L. isabelae is desert, at altitudes of 2,850–3,672 m (9,350–12,047 ft).

== Behavior ==
L. isabelae is terrestrial.

== Diet ==
L. isabelae preys upon insects.

== Reproduction ==
L. isabelae gives birth to live young, and its mode of reproduction has been called viviparous or ovoviviparous.
