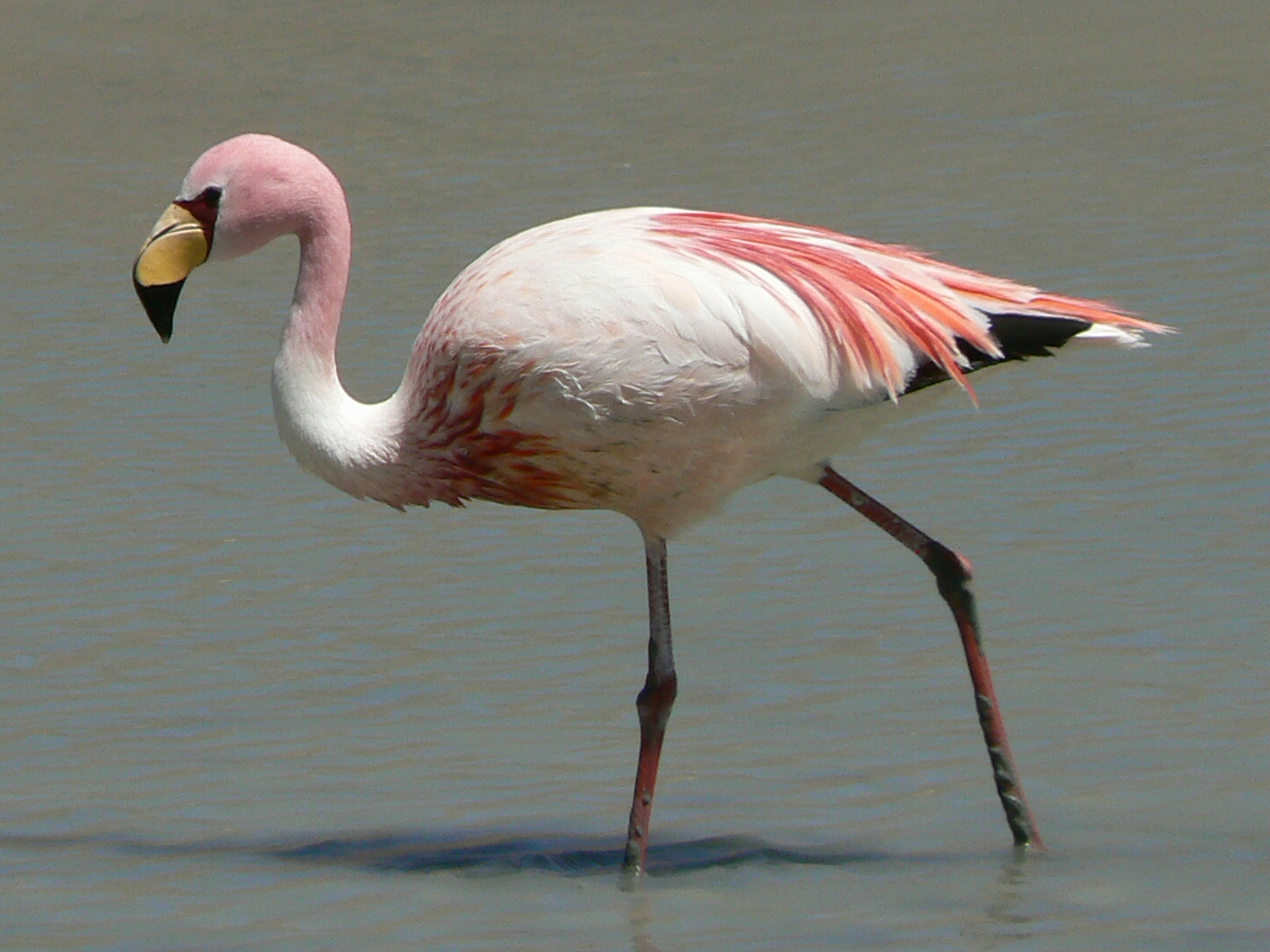
- In southwestern Bolivia

Conservation status
- Near Threatened (IUCN 3.1)
- CITES Appendix II

Scientific classification
- Kingdom: Animalia
- Phylum: Chordata
- Class: Aves
- Order: Phoenicopteriformes
- Family: Phoenicopteridae
- Genus: Phoenicoparrus
- Species: P. jamesi

Binomial name
- Phoenicoparrus jamesi (Sclater, PL, 1886)
- Range map Non-breeding Year-round Breeding

= James's flamingo =

Species of bird

James's flamingo (Phoenicoparrus jamesi), also known as the puna flamingo, is a species of flamingo that lives at high altitudes in the Andean plateaus of Peru, Chile, Bolivia, and northwest Argentina.

It is named for Harry Berkeley James, a British naturalist who studied the bird. James's flamingo is closely related to the Andean flamingo, and the two species are the only members of the genus Phoenicoparrus. The Chilean flamingo, Andean flamingo, and James's flamingo are all sympatric, and all live in colonies (including shared nesting areas). James's flamingo had been thought to be extinct until a population was discovered in a remote area in 1956.

== Description ==
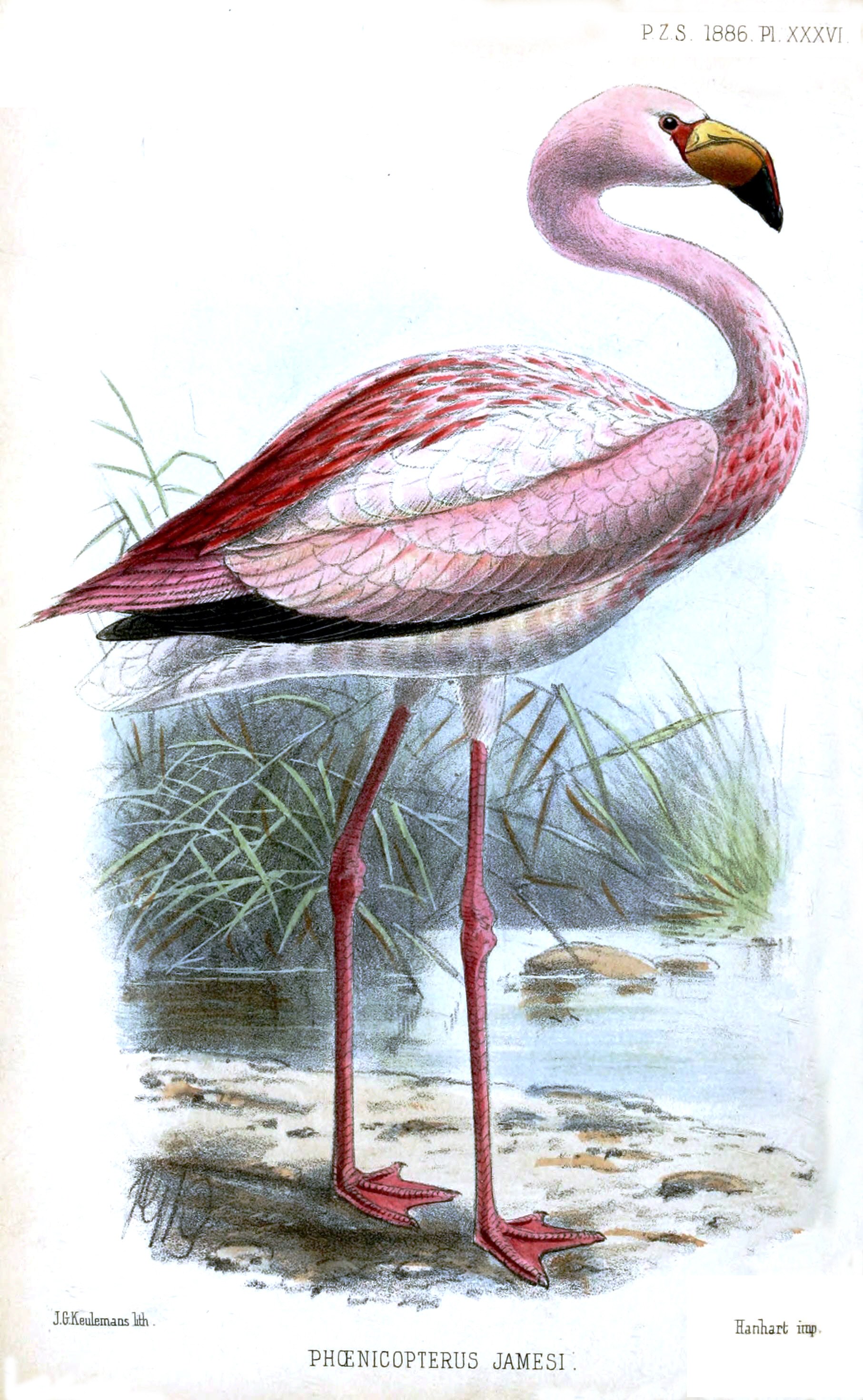
Illustration by J. G. Keulemans (1886)

The James's flamingo is smaller than the Andean flamingo, and is about the same size as the Old World species, the lesser flamingo. A specimen of the bird was first collected by Charles Rahmer, who was on a collecting expedition sponsored by Harry Berkeley James, (1846–1892, a manager of a Chilean saltpetre mine born in Walsall, England) after whom the bird was named. It typically measures about 90–92 cm (2.95–3.02 ft) long and weighs about 2 kg (4.4 lb). James's flamingos have a very long neck made up of 19 long cervical vertebrae, allowing for a large range of movement and rotation of the head. They are also distinctive for their long, thin legs. The knee is not externally visible: it is located at the top of the leg. The joint at the middle of the leg, which may be mistaken for the knee joint, is actually the ankle joint. Its plumage is very pale pink, with bright carmine streaks around the neck and on the back. When it is perched, a small amount of black can be seen in its wings; these are the "flight feathers". They have bright red skin around their eyes, which in adults are yellow. Their legs are brick red and their bills are bright yellow with a black tip.

The James's flamingo is similar to most of the flamingo species in South America, but the Chilean flamingo is pinker, with a longer bill (which is not yellow), and the Andean flamingo is larger, with more black in the wings and bill, and with yellow legs. The easiest way to distinguish James's flamingos is by their lighter-colored feathers and the bright yellow on their bills. A good method to distinguish the two Phoenicoparrus flamingo species from other flamingo species is to look at their feet. The two Phoenicoparrus species have three toes but no hallux. The feet of the other three species of flamingos have three forward-facing toes and a hallux.

=== Feathers ===
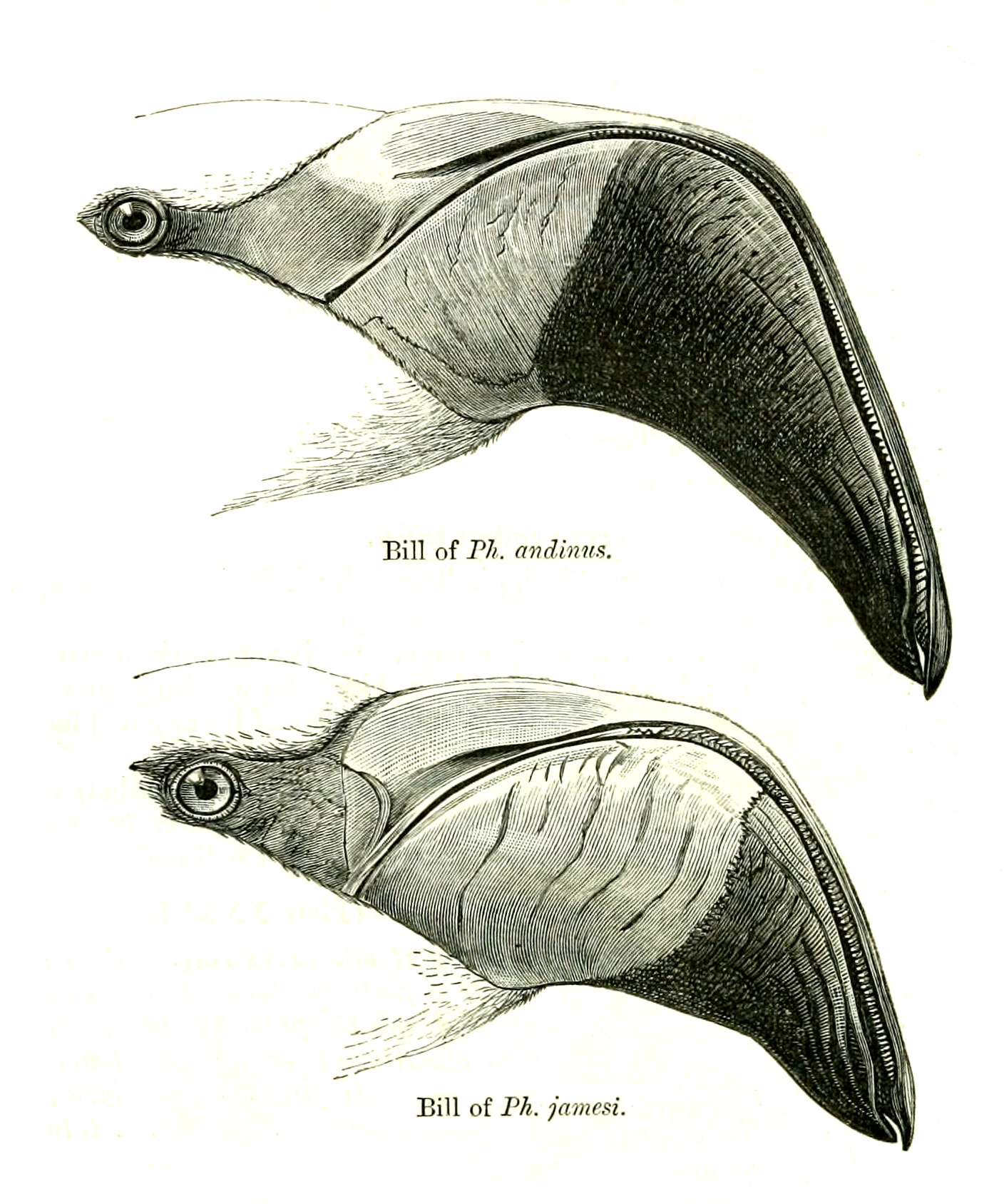
Comparison of bills of Andean flamingo (top) and James's flamingo (bottom)

Newly hatched flamingos are gray or white. Their feathers acquire a pink color by the time they are around 2 or 3 years old, due to their carotene-rich diet. The chemicals that color their feathers are the terpenoids: alpha- and beta-carotenes (similar to carotene in carrots). An adult has 12 major feathers designed for flight on each wing. The body is covered in contour feathers, which protect the bird and also help with waterproofing (due to a secretion of oil at the base of the feathers). When the birds are roosting, they face into the wind so that the rain will not blow upwards and soak the underside of their feathers.

Their plumage is pale pink, with bright carmine streaks around their necks and on their backs. When they are perching, a small amount of black can be seen in the wings; these are the flight feathers mentioned above. There are typically 12 to 16 tail feathers. James's flamingos molt their wing- and body feathers according to their breeding schedule and the color of the new feathers depends on the nature of their diet. There is no difference in color between males and females.

=== Flight ===
All flamingo species are capable of flying. The flight feathers are easily distinguished in James's flamingos as they are the only black feathers on the bird. To begin flying, they run a few steps and then begin to flap their wings. When they want to land, they repeat this process in reverse, and as they touch down to a surface, they continue to run as they decelerate and stop flapping their wings. When migrating in a flock, flamingos have been observed to fly at speeds of up to 37 mph (60 km/h). But they may not reach this speed when traveling shorter distances.

== Ecology ==
=== Feeding ===
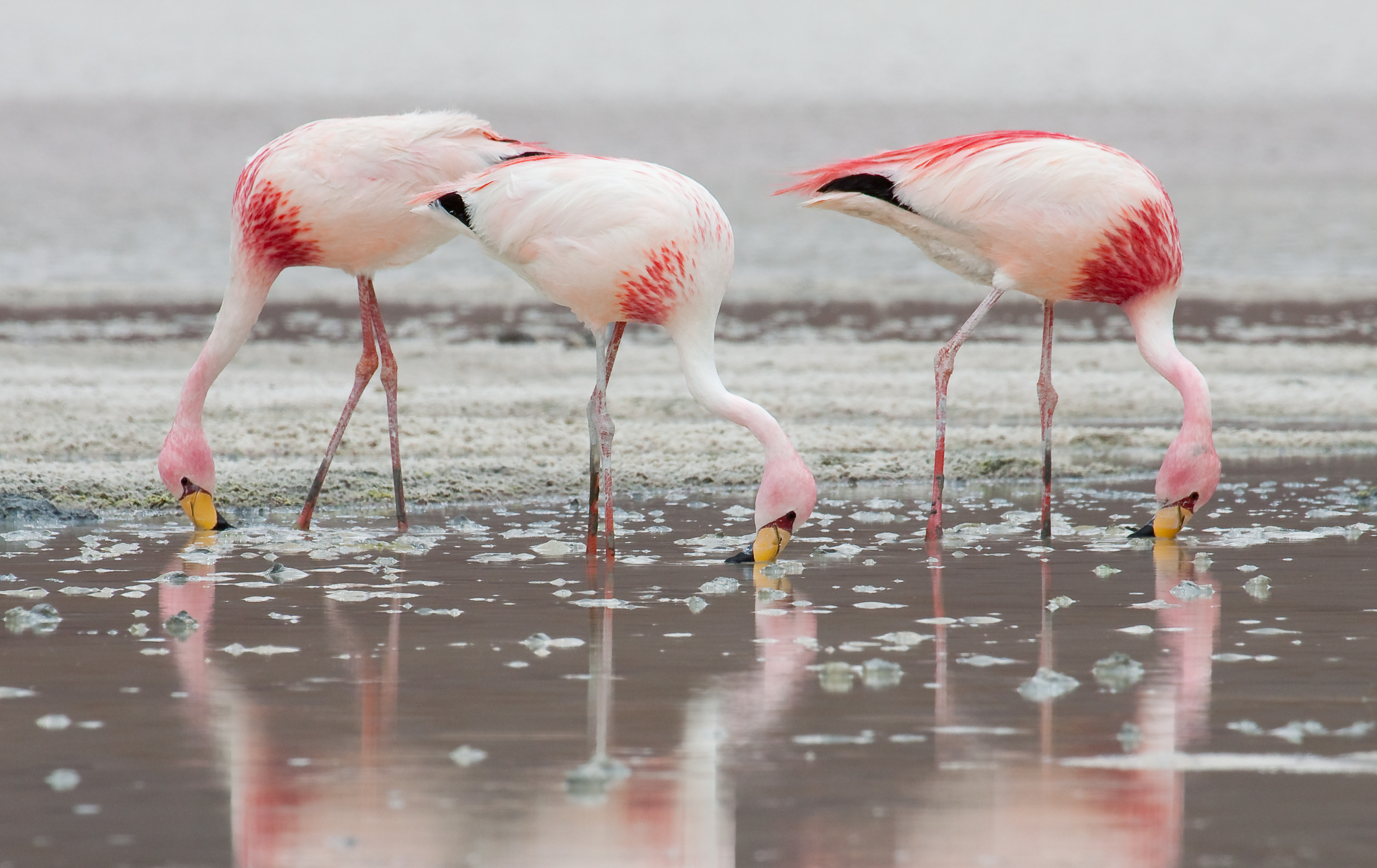
Feeding at Laguna Hedionda, Bolivia.

Both James's and Andean flamingos feed their chicks through an esophageal secretion that is regurgitated from the crop of the bird. The difference between the two species lies in the composition of the prolactin secretion produced by each bird. Both male and female parents are able to feed the chick. Adult flamingos are the most developed filter feeders of the birds. Of the species, James's flamingo has the finest filter-feeding apparatus. The flamingo feeds on diatoms and other microscopic algae. The shape of the bill is deeply keeled. To feed, the flamingos' long legs allow them to walk into the water and swoop their necks down into an S-shape to allow the beak to enter the water. The S-shape is effective because it allows the head to be placed upright and the bottom of the bill to be placed as shallow or as deep as it pleases. Only lowering the distal end of the bill into the water allows nostrils to remain above water. The water filled with small organisms floods the bill and filtration process begins. The lakes, from which the flamingo typically feeds, are Andean lakes which are mostly fresh water, but if salt water is encountered, the flamingos have salt glands in their nostrils where excess salt is secreted.

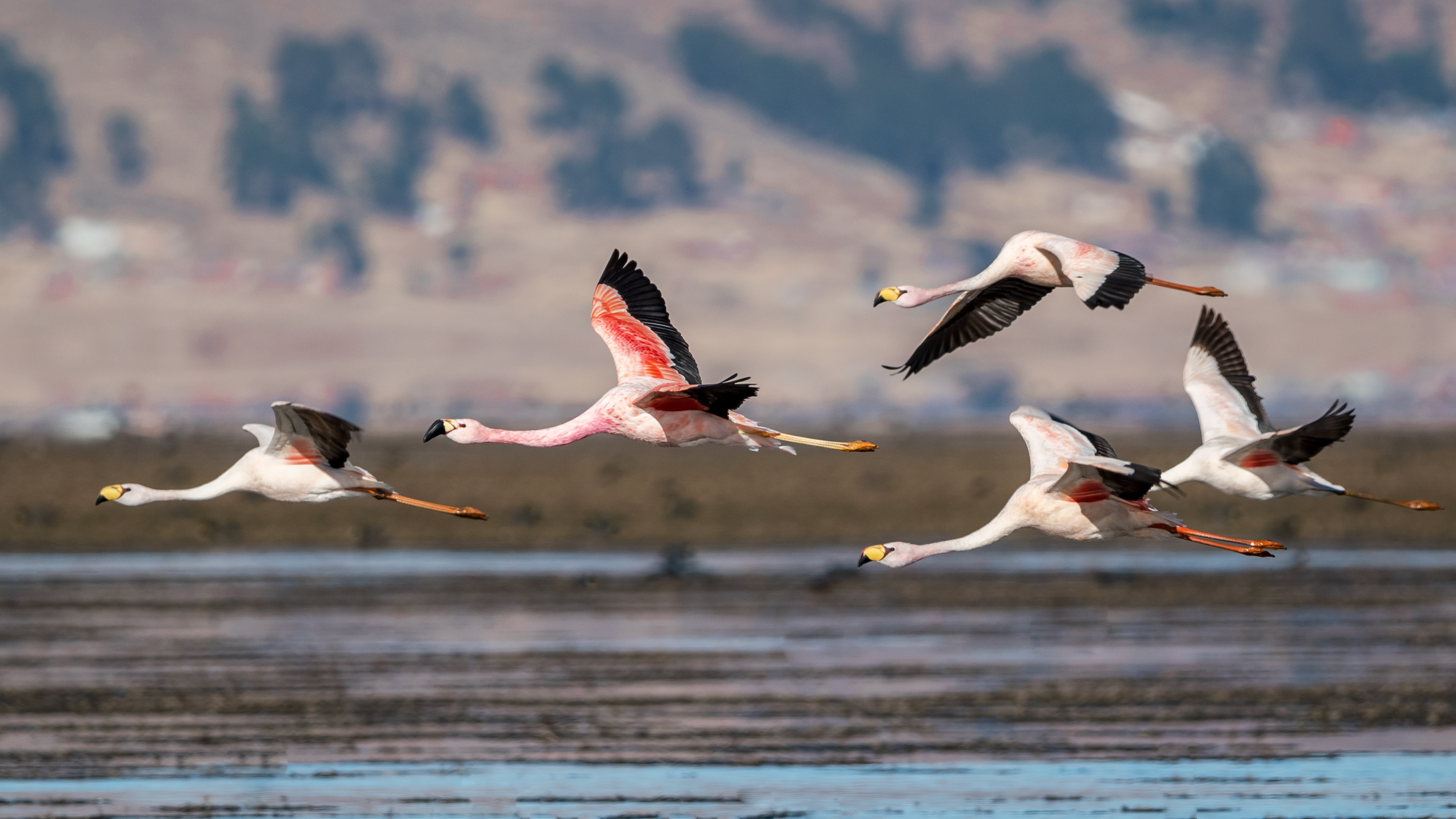
An Andean flamingo (center) amidst a flock of James's flamingos, in Potosí, Bolivia

The filtering process starts with the tongue, which is very soft and fleshy with channel-like features that direct the food and water to the filtering apparatus. The bill of James's flamingo is the narrowest of its kind. Both the Andean and James's flamingos have deep-keeled bills where the upper jaw is narrower than the lower. The gape of the bill is therefore on the dorsal side of the bill. The bill of James's flamingo is smaller and has a narrower upper jaw. The proximal end of the bill is mostly horizontal, then has a curvature downward and the distal end finishes with a hook-like feature. The inner morphology of the beak is similar to that of the lesser flamingo, where the upper and lower jaws contain lamellae which filter the food. In both the upper and lower jaw, the proximal portion of the bill contains lamellae that are ridge-like with a curvature and distal end become more like hooks. Marginal and submarginal lamellae are found, and James's flamingo has the greatest number of both, which also means a smaller intermarginal distance is seen between them. About 21 lamellae per cm are found in this species, which is more than twice the number found in other flamingos. When the upper and lower jaws close together, the lamellae mesh together to allow the bill to be closed fully. The sizes of the diatoms associated with this size filtering apparatus are about 21–60 μm. Diatoms this size are typically found close to the edge of the water; even in colonies of multiple species, James's flamingos typically feed in the region closest to the edge of the water. The birds are able to use their webbed feet to help kick up microscopic algae if not enough are floating in the water column.

=== Breeding ===
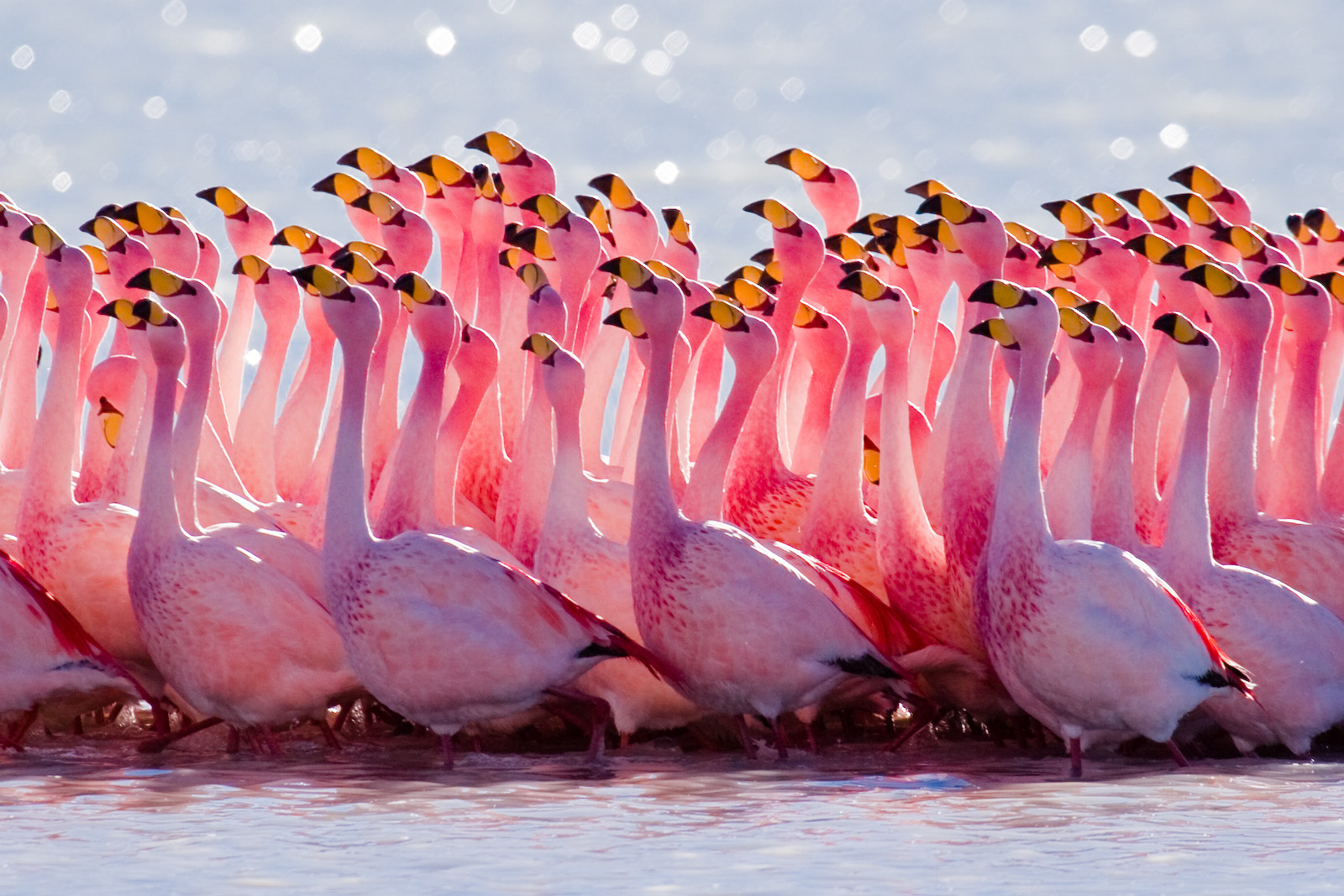
Mating ritual

Breeding cycles in flamingos begin at 6 years of age when fully matured. The frequency of breeding is irregular and may skip a year. The entire colony may participate in mating rituals at the same time. The males put on a show by vocalizing and sticking their necks and heads straight up in the air and turning their heads back and forth. The females initiate mating by walking away from the group and a male follows. The female then spreads her wings and the male mounts the female. The female lays one egg on a cone-shaped nest made from mud, sticks, and other materials in the area. The shape of the egg is oval, similar to that of a chicken. It is smaller in size (length and breadth) compared to the other species, including the closely related Andean flamingo.

Both the male and female incubate the egg for 26–31 days before it hatches. The chick breaks through the shell using an egg tooth, which is not actually a true tooth, but is actually a keratinized structure, which falls off after fully hatching. When newly hatched, the chick's bill is straight and red, but later develops a curve and the adult colors of beak. The feathers are white and grey and the legs are pink. The eyes of chicks are gray for their first year. The parents are able to distinguish their chick from others in the colony by appearance and vocalization.

== Conservation status ==
This species was determined to be near threatened by the IUCN in 2008, because the populations of the last three generations of this species have declined.

The greatest threat to the population of this species is human destruction of their habitat. In local culture, stealing the eggs from the nest and sell them was common practice, but since then, measures have been taken to control this. Environmental threats such as heavy rainfall may also have an effect on the breeding of the species. Threats the productivity of the diatoms also threaten the species if enough food is available for them to eat.

== See also ==
- Laguna Colorada
