= Salar de Punta Negra =

Saltpan in Antofagasta Region, Chile

Coordinates: 24.595°S 68.970°W

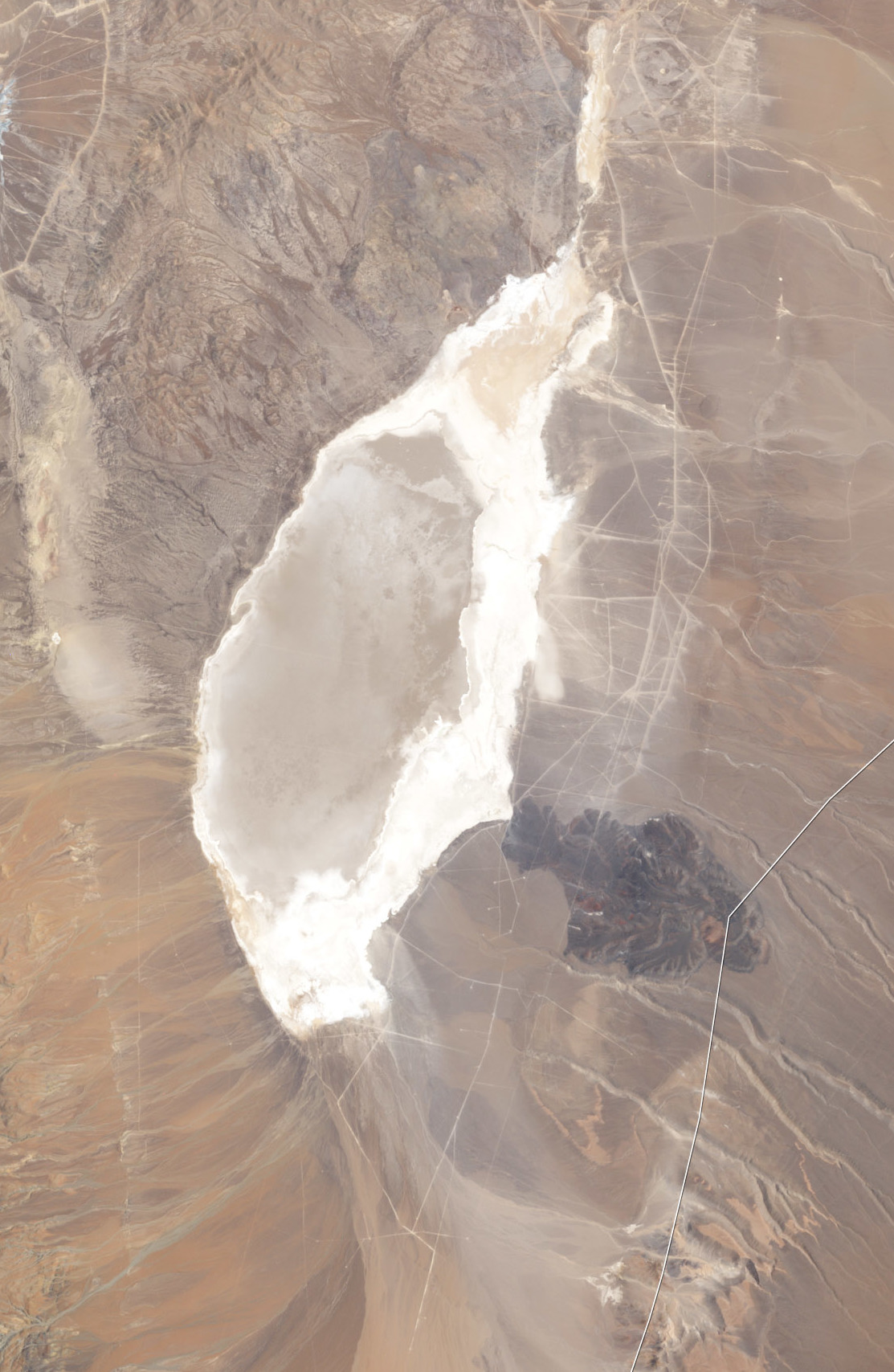

Salar de Punta Negra is a saltpan in the Antofagasta Region of Chile with a surface area of about 230 square kilometres (89 sq mi). It is surrounded by deposits left by dry valleys that descend the Western Cordillera. These dry valleys, from mountains such as the Llullaillaco volcano, carry water only occasionally. More permanent sources of water, in the form of springs, also exist at Salar de Punta Negra.

At the beginning of the Holocene era, the area was wetter than today, although the idea that Salar de Punta Negra once contained a permanent lake has been disproven. Early humans moved into the area to exploit the wetlands and left traces in the form of projectile points and archeological sites. Copper mining presently takes place in the region.

== Geography and geomorphology ==
The Salar de Punta Negra lies in the eastern Antofagasta Region of Chile, which is an important source of copper and nitrate for the country. Before 1981, when a large mine opened in the area, access to the region was difficult. The name refers to a black lava flow on the eastern side of Salar de Punta Negra that was erupted during the Late Pleistocene.

The Salar has a surface of 230 square kilometres (89 sq mi), and is a playa with a polygonal clayey-salty surface that is in some places uplifted and occasional canals and ponds filled with saltwater. The salt deposits consist mainly of gypsum, halite and ulexite, they form crenulated rims and pressure ridges in some points. The playa appears to be somewhat asymmetric, lower in the northwest, probably a consequence of faulting.

Salar de Punta Negra lies at the centre of a converging drainage network and is surrounded by a bajada which often becomes steep where it meets the playa and is itself crisscrossed by channels that originate in dry valleys at the top of the bayada. Of these dry valleys, four of these in the Western Cordillera carry water seasonally and are known as Quebrada Zorros, Quebrada Zorritos, Quebrada Tocomar (or Toconar) and Quebrada Llullaillaco. These are often subject to flash floods which occasionally reach the playa surface in the form of mudflows. Additional valleys are the Quebrada El Salto and the Quebrada El Salado. The Río Frio enters the Salar from the south and gets its water from the Cordillera Domeyko. Most of the drainages do not carry water all the way to Salar de Punta Negra; the water seeps underground before reaching the Salar. Finally, fault-controlled springs such as Barrancas Blancas and water seeps at the eastern margin of Salar de Punta Negra discharge water.

It is part of a 77 kilometres (48 mi) long and 30 kilometres (19 mi) wide basin between the Western Cordillera with its volcanoes and the Cordillera Domeyko which has formed through tectonic processes in the Mesozoic and Cenozoic including block faulting and was then filled by Cenozoic deposits. In the Western Cordillera, the volcano Llullaillaco reaches a height of 6,725 metres (22,064 ft) while the average elevation of the depression amounts to 3,000 metres (9,800 ft); Llullaillaco is one of the highest volcanoes in the world. The basin has a surface area of about 4,263 square kilometres (1,646 sq mi); to the east of Salar de Punta Negra lie the Pampa El Salado, the Pampa San Eulogio and the Pampa del Chino. North of Punta Negra lies the smaller Salar de Imilac.

=== Supposed paleolake ===
It was once believed that Salar de Punta Negra at one time contained a large lake, 55 kilometres (34 mi) long, 20 kilometres (12 mi) wide and 125 metres (410 ft) deep at least. Traces of the former lake such as lacustrine sediments, river deltas, shorelines and lacustrine terraces have been found. During the latest Pleistocene-Holocene, the Quebrada de las Zorras conveyed water from the mountains around Llullaillaco to Salar de Punta Negra. The lake eventually overflowed first into the Salar de Imilac farther north and then through the Quebrada de Agua Colorada into the Salar de Atacama; archeological findings have been made in proximity to the overflow pathways.

Later research indicated that there is no firm evidence of such a lake such as either lacustrine sediments or former shorelines, with supposed shorelines being instead berms formed by subsidence and faults. Likewise, typical fine sediments associated with water are only found on the eastern side of Salar de Punta Negra, where springs are active. The absence of a lake in Salar de Punta Negra is consistent with the fact that paleolakes with clear shorelines in the region only occur at elevations of over 3,500 metres (11,500 ft). Farther south, the Salar de Aguas Calientes and the Salar de Pajonales feature clear evidence of former lakes.

== Geology ==
The Central Andes in Chile consist of five separate geological domains. From east to west these are the Western Cordillera with active volcanoes, the Pre-Andean Depression which contains a number of Tertiary basins such as the Salar de Atacama and the Salar de Punta Negra, the Cordillera de Domeyko, the Central Depression and finally the Cordillera de la Costa. With the exception of the Salar de Atacama, the geology of the Pre-Andean Depression is usually poorly known, as most geological research is focused on the eastern side of the Andes where oil reserves are suspected and on the copper-bearing domains of the western Andes.

The area is largely covered by Cenozoic sediments and volcanic rocks, but in outcrops a number of older formations can be observed: Devonian-Carboniferous marine deposits (Zorritas Formation), pyroclastic rocks (La Tabla Formation), both of which reach thicknesses of over 2 kilometres (1.2 mi), 300-280 million years old plutons, the Triassic sediment-volcanic Sierra Guanaco and the fluvial-lacustrine Sierra de Varas and the marine Rhaetian-Jurassic Profeta Formation. Finally, there are Paleogene deposits of mostly sedimentary or volcanic origin such as the Naranja Formation and the Pampa de Mulas Formation. Large fault systems such as the Escondida-Punta Negra fault delimit the Salar de Punta Negra basin to the west and the east; some eastern faults offset recent deposits.

== Climate and biology ==
The area has a cold desert climate with average temperatures of 18–8 °C (64–46 °F) and average annual rainfall of 14 millimetres per year (0.55 in/year)-30 millimetres per year (1.2 in/year); precipitation diminishes from 50–150 millimetres per year (2.0–5.9 in/year) in the Western Cordillera to almost zero in the Cordillera Domeyko and occurs mostly during the summer months, leading to episodic flows in the dry valleys. Diurnal temperature variation reaches 30 °C (54 °F) and the region is windy, with winds reaching up to 90 kilometres per hour (56 mph) and an average of 14 kilometres per hour (8.7 mph).

There is virtually no vegetation close to Salar de Punta Negra today, with the exception of small wetlands along its margins which support some noctuid moths, including three novel species. The area of Salar de Punta Negra is also frequented by animals such as flamingos. Shrubs grow below 4,100 metres (13,500 ft) elevation, grasses grow at higher elevations. Numerous mammal and bird species live in the region. In the past, conversely, wetlands existed at Salar de Punta Negra, including grasses, shrubs and sedges. Snail remnants have also been found in the former wetland deposits. The formation of the wetlands took place 15,900–13,800 and 12,700–9,700 years ago as part of two more general wet periods in the region, the Central Andean Pluvial Events (CAPE), which were discovered at Salar de Punta Negra. These wetlands disappeared around 9,700 - 8,100 calibrated radiocarbon years ago.

== Human activity ==
While the Atacama Desert was once considered an obstacle to human habitation, many traces of past human activity have been found in it. Between 12,800 and 9,700 years ago the "Central Andean Pluvial Event" led to the formation of large lakes in the Altiplano and of wetlands in the lowlands; these wetlands acted as oases of life and also as stepping stones for the spread of early humans. During the later Holocene the climate became more arid again, the lakes and many of these wetlands disappeared again.

The latest Pleistocene-early Holocene was also the time by which humans in South America had colonized all available spaces with various technological strategies; in the case of the Atacama region, this included the then-existing wetlands. There are about 36 archeological sites at Salar de Punta Negra; human artifacts have been found at sites such as former wetlands like the "SPN-1" site at the northern end of Salar de Punta Negra. Human activity bears a strong correlation to the presence of wetlands, and declined when the wetlands shrunk early in the Holocene. Humans continued to be active at Salar de Punta Negra even after the drying of the climate, with one site close to a waterhole dated to 4,970 - 4,830 years ago via calibrated radiocarbon, although most earlier sites had been abandoned. This is consistent with the so-called "archeological silence" of this period in the Salar de Atacama area.

At the Pleistocene/Holocene sites of Salar de Punta Negra, furnaces have been found which feature camelid bones, various types of tools, and projectile points. The objects found at Salar de Punta Negra resemble these found at other contemporaneous archeological sites in Peru, Ecuador, Chile and Argentina and may stem from an Archaic to pre-Paleo-Indian occupation of the area. The objects have been classified as belonging to the Fell, Tuina, and Punta Negra archaeological traditions. At Punta Negra, hunter-gatherer populations used the locally available plants and camelid animals; the tools discovered there are associated with slaughtering and hunting. Other archeological sites in the area include pircas, rock art and Inca roads such as a major Inca highway. It was built in 1485 to aid in the Inca conquest of the territory and cairns of Tocomar and Vaquillas flank it; for the Inca, the region was a source for minerals such as copper, gold and turquoise. Copper mining has continued into the present-day, associated with groundwater depletion and the drying of remnant wetlands, leading to legal restrictions in 2005 on groundwater exploration and a complaint by the Chilean State Defence Council in 2020. The results of groundwater depletion at Salar de Punta Negra induced local communities to fight similar water exploration projects in the Salar de Atacama.
