= Liolaemus ruibali =

Conservation status
- Least Concern (IUCN 3.1)

Scientific classification
- Kingdom: Animalia
- Phylum: Chordata
- Class: Reptilia
- Order: Squamata
- Suborder: Iguania
- Family: Liolaemidae
- Genus: Liolaemus
- Species: L. ruibali

Binomial name
- Liolaemus ruibali Donoso-Barros, 1961

Species of lizard

Liolaemus ruibali, also known as Ruibal's tree iguana, is a species of lizard in the family Liolaemidae. It is endemic to the Andes of Argentina in northern Mendoza and southern San Juan provinces. It occurs in sandy, rocky areas with short shrubs at elevations of 2,500–3,500 m (8,200–11,500 ft) above sea level.
