= List of volcanoes in Argentina =

This is a list of active and extinct volcanoes in Argentina.

== Volcanoes ==
Name	Type	Elevation		Location	Last eruption
Name	Type	meters	feet	Coordinates	Last eruption
Agua Poca	Cinder Cone	657	2,156	37°1′S 68°7′W	600,000 years ago
Aguas Calientes	Caldera	4,473	14,675	24°5′S 66°30′W	200,000 years ago
Aguiliri	Lava Dome Complex				12.7 mya
Antilla	Complex volcano			26°10′S 64°40′W	4.67 mya
Antofagasta de la Sierra	Volcanic field	4,000	13,123	26°04.8′S 67°30′W	Unknown
Antofalla	Stratovolcano	6,440	20,013	25°31.8′S 68°00′W	Unknown
Aracar	Stratovolcano	6,082	19,954	24°16.2′S 67°46.2′W	1993
Arizaro volcanic field	Volcanic field			24°45′00″S 68°02′30″W	80,000 ± 60,000 years before present
Auca Mahuida	Shield volcano	2,243	7,359	37.738°S 68.924°W	
Barro Negro	Cinder Cone				>6.6 mya
Cerro Beltrán	Stratovolcano				14 mya
Caldera del Atuel	Caldera	5,189	17,024	34°39′S 70°03′W	Unknown
Casa Colorada	Lava Dome			22°19′S 66°20′W	17 mya
Cerro Archibarca	Stratovolcano			25°15′S 67°50′W	11 mya
Cerro Bayo	Complex volcano	5,401	17,720	25°25.2′S 68°34.8′W	Holocene
Cerro Blanco	Caldera	4,400	14,436	26°46′0″S 67°43′0″W	Holocene
Cerro Bitiche	Volcanic field			22°52′S 67°3′W	Miocene-Pliocene
Cerro de los Chenques	Monogenetic volcano			44°52′25″S 70°03′49″W	Holocene
Cerro El Cóndor	Stratovolcano	6,532	21,430	26°37.2′S 68°21′W	Holocene
Cerro Escorial	Stratovolcano	5,447	17,871	25°04.8′S 68°22.2′W	Holocene
Cerro Morado	Volcanic field			22°51′S 66°43′W	Miocene
Cerro Panizos	Caldera	+5,000	+16,000	22°15′S 66°45′W	Miocene
Cerro Ratones	Stratovolcano				7 mya
Cerro Redondo	Lava Dome complex			22°22′S 66°08′W	Miocene
Cerros Negros de Jama	Volcanic field			23°29′S 66°56′W	
Tronador	Stratovolcano	3,478	11410.76	41.160°S 71.887°W	
Cerro Torta	Lava dome	5,460	17,910	26.753°S 68.140°W	430,000 years
Cerro Tuzgle	Stratovolcano	5,500	18,044	24°03′S 66°28.8′W	Holocene
Cerro Volcánico	Cinder Cone	1,930	6,332	41°16.8′S 71°39′W	Holocene
Chimpa	Volcanic complex	4,856	4,796	24°00′S 66°08′W	12 mya
Chinchillas	Lava Dome Complex			22°30′S 66°15′W	13±1 mya
Chivinar	Stratovolcano	5,125	16,814	24°14′S 67°27′W	9 mya
Cochiquito Volcanic Group	Volcanic field	1,435	4,708	36°46.2′S 69°49.2′W	Unknown
Copahue	Stratovolcano	2,997	9,833	37°51′0″S 71°10′0″W	2024 CE
Coranzulí	Caldera			25°20′0″S 68°31′0″W	Unknown
Cordón del Azufre	Complex volcano	5,463	17,923	25°20′0″S 68°31′0″W	Unknown
Corrida de Cori	Stratovolcano Complex			25°06′S 68°20′W	Holocene?
Crater Basalt volcanic field	Volcanic field	1,344	4,409	42.02°S 70.18°W	Holocene?
Cueros de Purulla	Lava dome			26°33′S 67°49′W	7820 BP
Domuyo	Stratovolcano	4,709	15,449	36°35′0″S 70°25′0″W	Unknown
El Toro volcanic field	Volcanic field			23°05′S 66°42′W	Unknown
Falso Azufre	Complex volcano	5,890	19,324	26°48′0″S 68°22′0″W	Holocene
Farallon Negro	Stratovolcano			27°15′S 66°33′W	~6 mya
Galán	Caldera	6,100	20,013	25°55′0″S 66°52′0″W	2.2 mya
Huanquihue Group	Stratovolcano Complex	1,400?	4,593	39°52′0″S 71°33′0″W	1750±100 CE
Incahuasi	Stratovolcano	6,621	21,722	27°2′30″S 68°17′0″W	Unknown
Incapillo	Caldera	5,750	18,860	27°53′24″S 68°49′12″W	500,000 years ago
Infiernillo	Volcanic field			35.142°S 69.83°W	6890±40 BCE
Laguna Amarga	Caldera				4 mya
Laguna Escondida	Caldera			26.7°S 68.5°W	3 mya
La Hoyada	Volcanic complex			26.85°S 67.74°W	4.42 mya
Lanín	Stratovolcano	3,747	12,293	39°37′58″S 71°29′59″W	560±150 CE
Las Lozas volcanics					320 mya
Lastarria	Stratovolcano	5,697	18,691	25°10′0″S 68°30′0″W	Holocene
Leon Muerto	Stratovolcano	4,799	15,745	25°57′S 68°28′W	19.9±0.8 mya
Llullaillaco	Stratovolcano	6,739	22,109	24°43′0″S 68°32′0″W	1877 CE
Los Gemelos-El Saladillo	Monogenetic volcanoes				35,000 years ago
Luingo	Caldera			26°10′0″S 63°30′0″W	Miocene
Maipo	Stratovolcano	5,264	17,270	34°9′38″S 69°49′58″W	1912 CE
Minuyoc	Lava Dome Complex			22°32′S 66°14′W	Unknown
Negra Muerta	Caldera			24°27′30″S 66°12′30″W	7-6 mya
Negro de Chorrillos	Stratovolcano			24°16′S 66°24′W	200,000 ± 150,000 years ago, 450,000 years ago, or 200,000 ± 80,000 years ago
Ojos del Salado	Stratovolcano	6,887	22,595	27°7′0″S 68°33′0″W	Unknown
Pairique volcanic complex	Volcanic complex			22°55′S 66°50′W	Between 11.5 and 10.3 mya
Pali-Aike Volcanic Field	Volcanic field	282	925	52°0′0″S 70°0′0″W	5550±1000 BCE
Pan de Azúcar	Lava Dome Complex			22°36′S 66°03′W	
Pasto Ventura	Volcanic field			26°50′00″S 67°17′30″W	270,000 ± 40,000 years
Payún Matrú	Shield Volcano	3,680	12,073	36°25′0″S 69°12′0″W	Holocene
Peinado	Stratovolcano	5,740	18,832	26°37′0″S 68°9′0″W	Holocene
Pirurayo	Stratovolcano			22°21′S 65°52′W	28±3 and 20±2 mya
Planchón-Peteroa	Complex volcano	4,107	13,471	35°14′24″S 70°34′12″W	2011 CE
Pocho volcanic field					4.7 +- 0.3 million years ago
Puesto Cortaderas	Volcanic cone	970	3,182	37°33′0″S 69°37′0″W	Holocene
Ramadas Volcanic Centre	Volcanic complex	3,800	12,500	24°08′3″S 66°20′57.1″W	8.73±0.25 mya
Rincon volcanic complex	Volcanic complex			24°05′S 67°20′W	Miocene
Risco Plateado	Stratovolcano	4,999	16,401	34°56′0″S 70°0′0″W	Unknown
San Jerónimo	Cinder Cone			24°14′S 66°30′W	780,000±100,000 years ago
Sierra Nevada de Lagunas Bravas	Lava Dome Complex	6,127	20,101	26°28.8′S 68°34.8′W	Unknown
Socompa	Stratovolcano	6,051	19,852	24°24′0″S 68°15′0″W	5250 BCE
Tastil volcanic complex				24°45′S 65°53′W	Miocene
Tebenquicho	Complex volcano			25.33333°S 67.68333°W	Miocene
Tipas	Complex volcano	6,660	21,850	27°12′0″S 68°33′0″W	Holocene
Tocomar		4,388	14,396	24°10′S 66°34′W	Pleistocene
Trocon	Lava Dome Complex	2,500	8,200	37°45′0″S 69°53′0″W	Unknown
Tromen	Stratovolcano	3,978	13,051	37°8′30″S 70°2′0″W	1822 CE
TulTul, Del Medio and Pocitos	Stratovolcanoes			24°10′S 67°03′W	8-6 million years ago
Vicuña Pampa	Volcanic complex			26°50′S 67°00′W	Miocene
Viedma	Subglacial volcano	1,500	4,921	49°21′30″S 73°17′0″W	1988 CE
Vilama	Supervolcano			22°24′S 66°57′W	Miocene-Pleistocene
