= Pasto Ventura =

Area in northwestern Argentina including 14 volcanoes

- Location within Argentina

Highest point
- Coordinates: 26°50′00″S 67°17′30″W

Pasto Ventura is an area in the Catamarca Province of Argentina. It features about 14 small Pleistocene volcanoes, mostly cinder cones with associated lava flows but also lava domes, tuff rings and two maars. The volcanoes are accompanied by pyroclastic deposits and their total volume reaches about 0.42 cubic kilometres (0.10 cu mi). Argon-argon dating has yielded ages ranging from 1.3 million years to about 270,000 years for volcanic rocks in the field.

Faults have displaced several of the cones, and their movement reflects a tectonic environment characterized by ongoing extension of the Altiplano-Puna high plateau. Several dry valleys cross across the volcanic field and a lake (Laguna Pasto Ventura) is also located within the field. The climate in the region is currently arid but may have been wetter in the past. Vegetation consists of sparse bush.

== Geography and geomorphology ==
Pasto Ventura lies in the southern Puna region of northwestern Argentina. It lies about 40 kilometres (25 mi) southwest of El Peñón, Catamarca and Provincial Route 43 between El Peñón and Los Nacimientos passes northeast of the field. The Pasto Ventura pass was an important route in the region during the pre-modern era.

The landscape is characterized by ridges, valleys and small volcanoes. Approximately 26 small volcanoes have been identified at Pasto Ventura, including 14 volcanic cones, seven volcanic domes, two maars and three tuff rings; one isolated lava flow linked to an eruption fissure has been reported and additional volcanoes may exist but are buried under lava. None of these volcanoes has a volume exceeding 0.2 cubic kilometres (0.048 cu mi) and the total volume reaches only 0.42 cubic kilometres (0.10 cu mi), making them small edifices by the standard of the Puna. The frequency of volcanic landforms per unit area is also low with only seven vents every 100 square kilometres (39 sq mi).

Various volcanic forms are recognized in the Pasto Ventura area. Cinder cones, which form the majority of volcanoes there, reach heights of 60–100 metres (200–330 ft) and are capped by summit craters with widths of 120–270 metres (390–890 ft). Scoria cones are between 20 metres (66 ft) and 760 metres (2,490 ft) wide. Individual domes are up to 122 metres (400 ft) high and cover a ground of 0.11–1.44 square kilometres (0.042–0.556 sq mi), forming cake-shaped structures whose emplacement was controlled by regional tectonics and local topography. Their formation was sometimes preceded by phreatomagmatic eruptions when the ascending magma interacted with groundwater. The two maars are 0.74 kilometres (0.46 mi) and 0.63 kilometres (0.39 mi) wide while the width of the tuff rings, which are shallower than the maars, ranges between 0.53–0.14 kilometres (0.329–0.087 mi). The maars and tuff rings are surrounded by deposits generated through dilute pyroclastic flows. A lake is still present in one of the maars, which also contains lacustrine deposits. Maars are unusual in the Puna.

The scoria cones are mainly formed by deposits of lapilli, lava bombs and scoria and were generated by Strombolian eruptions. Some of the volcanoes are surrounded by pyroclastic flow or pyroclastic fallout deposits, others are linked with lava flows. Flows run along valleys, spread over flat terrain or form delta-like structures at slope breaks, and reach lengths of over 5 kilometres (3.1 mi) but more commonly 1–3 kilometres (0.62–1.86 mi) from the source vents. The lava flows have thicknesses of 2–5 metres (6 ft 7 in – 16 ft 5 in) and feature flow structures typical for aa lava. Pyroclastic material was often rafted by lava flows, forming isolated deposits on these, and spatter deposits were generated by Hawaii-like fire fountaining. Ultimately, the variety of volcanic landforms at Pasto Ventura is a consequence of interactions between various factors, such as the speed at which magma rose.

Normal faults and strike-slip faults have offset channels, terraces and volcanic cones, but are difficult to recognize. Volcanoes are aligned on older reverse faults. Two thrust faults run in southwest-northeast direction across the area and show evidence of normal displacement. In the lee of landscape features wind-transported sand has accumulated. Now-dry river channels - sometimes blocked by dunes - cross the area and are flanked by river terraces, and steep alluvial fans lie at the foot of mountains. Deposits of sinter and salt pans/lakes complete the landscape, which is covered with desert pavement, loess, rock debris and sand. The lake Laguna Pasto Ventura lies at 3,700 metres (12,100 ft) elevation within the area and a perennial creek called Barrancas runs across the field. Some streams have been captured by drainages from outside the Puna.

== Geology ==
Eastward subduction of the Nazca Plate beneath the South American Plate has been ongoing for the past 50 million years, with a rate of about 5–15 centimetres per year (2.0–5.9 in/year). It has generated the Altiplano-Puna high plateau, which with a length of 1,500 kilometres (930 mi) and a width of 300–500 kilometres (190–310 mi) is the second largest such plateau in the world. The northern Altiplano has a large central basin and a thick underlying crust, while the Puna has a rugged landscape with a number of intervening basins. The Altiplano-Puna high plateau is undergoing horizontal extension, perhaps due to the weight of the high plateau overcoming the compressional tectonic forces, due to delamination of the crust inducing uplift or in the case of the southern Puna by southward shearing of the plateau. In the Puna, extension appears to have begun between 10 and 5 million years ago. A basin formed at Pasto Ventura during the Miocene and was filled with thick sedimentary deposits; it is the only exposed basin in the Puna.

The high plateau is volcanically active, with various stratovolcanoes, monogenetic volcanoes, lava domes, calderas and associated ignimbrites including Cerro Galán. Some of these volcanic centres are aligned along northwest-southeast trending lineaments. The rocks have shoshonitic, mafic and calc-alkaline composition. The magma feeding these volcanic centres appears to come from the asthenosphere and the ascent of mafic magmas is facilitated by the extensional tectonic regime and by faulting.

=== Local ===
The basement consists mainly of Precambrian-Paleozoic metamorphic rocks with intruded granitic, mafic and ultramafic rocks of Paleozoic age; these metamorphic rocks are also known as the Puncoviscana Formation. There are Paleogene-Neogene continental sequences. It is mostly buried beneath Quaternary sediments; outcrops have characteristic dark colours. The Quaternary sediments in turn contain both aeolian, colluvium and alluvium-derived sediments; older aeolian sediments of Miocene age are also found. A major regional tectonic lineament known as Culampaja passes through Pasto Ventura and the Vicuña Pampa volcanic complex lies east of the area.

The volcanic rocks at Pasto Ventura are formed by basalt, andesite and basaltic andesite, and define a calc-alkaline suite. Lava flows and lava domes at Pasto Ventura have yielded phenocrysts of amphibole, olivine, plagioclase, pyroxene and xenocryst quartz; basement rocks are present as xenoliths and occur as blocks in maar deposits.

Lithospheric delamination may be the cause of volcanism in the area. The amount of magma generated is small, most of it is primitive mafic magma, and its ascent was controlled by local tectonic structures. In the case of Pasto Ventura, the composition of the magmas is influenced by fluids emanating from the downgoing Nazca Plate slab as well as by a relic mantle that already influenced magma composition during the Famatinian Orogeny c. 485 million years ago.

== Climate and vegetation ==
The regional climate is extremely arid with annual precipitation reaching about 100 millimetres per year (3.9 in/year). The occurrence of maars and tuff rings at Pasto Ventura - their formation requires the presence of water - may relate either to past wetter conditions, to the interaction between ascending magma and local or deep aquifers or the fact that Pasto Ventura is located at the margins of the Puna and thus in a moister region. Shorelines around Laguna Pasto Ventura indicate that during the late Pleistocene the climate was wetter than today. Vegetation in the Puna is sparse and consists of short bush.

== Eruption and faulting history ==
The oldest volcanic rocks in the Pasto Ventura region are of Miocene age. Among the old volcanism are basaltic andesite lava flows in the eastern part of the field; they are partially buried by sediments and have lost their surface features. Other volcanic centres are well preserved despite their age, as erosion rates are low on the Puna plateau. The faults include both faults that began to form in the Quaternary and older faults which were later reactivated.

Argon-argon dating has yielded ages of 1.3 ± 0.6 million years, 760,000 ± 160,000 years, 680,000 ± 60,000, 570,000 ± 40,000, c. 500,000 years, 450,000 ± 20,000, 430,000 ± 70,000, 420,000 ± 50,000, and 340,000 ± 50,000 - 270,000 ± 40,000 years for several cinder cones. Additional ages of 570,000, 470,000, 450,000, 430,000 and 420,000 years have been reported. Volcanic landforms are moderately mature, featuring gullies and slumps due to erosion. Rates of 0.02–0.08 millimetres per year (0.00079–0.00315 in/year) have been determined for the movement of some faults, indicating a relatively slow rate of tectonic movement; this is also supported by the lack of detectable present-day extension in geodetic GPS.
