= Magma supply rate =

Production rate of magma at a volcano

The magma supply rate measures the production rate of magma at a volcano. Global magma production rates on Earth are about 20–25 cubic kilometres per year (4.8–6.0 mi^{3}/a).

== Definitions ==
Magma supply rate is also known as the Armstrong unit, where 1 Armstrong Unit = 1 cubic kilometre per year (32 m^{3}/s). Armstrong unit can also refer to volcanic flux rate per length of arc in discussions of volcanic arcs, in that case km2/year.

Sometimes in discussion of large volcanic systems such as volcanic arcs the volcanic flux rate is normalized to a surface area, similar to Darcy's law in hydrodynamics. It is often easier to measure magma supply rates when they are normalized for an exposed surface area as it is often difficult to delimit an intrusion.

== Measurement difficulties ==
Estimating the volcanic flux rate or magma supply of a volcanic system is inherently difficult for a number of reasons, and different measurements can come to different conclusions about the volcanic flux rate of a given volcanic system. Not all volcanic bodies are equally well exposed, and it is often impossible or difficult to measure magma supply rates exactly. Furthermore, volcanic flux rates often vary over time, with distinct lulls and pulses. Wall rocks may be assimilated by magma or magma may undergo differentiation such as crystallization. Magma contains vesicles and volcanic edifices are often eroded. The sizes of volcanic edifices and plutons are difficult to estimate, especially in intrusions which are mostly buried.

== Applications ==
The magma supply rate is used to infer the behaviour of volcanic systems which erupt periodically, as well as to describe the growth of the continental crust and of deep-seated magmatic bodies such as plutons. Magma output is usually larger in oceanic settings than in continental ones, and basaltic volcanic systems produce more magma than silicic ones.

== Table of selected flux rates ==
| Name | Rate | Timespan | Method | Reference |
|---|---|---|---|---|
| Aegina volcanic field | 0.0004 cubic kilometres per millennium (9.6×10^{−5} mi^{3}/ka) | | | |
| Altiplano-Puna volcanic complex | 1 cubic kilometre per millennium (0.24 mi^{3}/ka) extrusive, 3–5 cubic kilometres per millennium (0.72–1.20 mi^{3}/ka) intrusive | 10 mya | Total volume/Duration | |
| Altiplano-Puna volcanic complex, first pulse | 1.5 cubic kilometres per millennium (0.36 mi^{3}/ka) extrusive, 4.5–8 cubic kilometres per millennium (1.1–1.9 mi^{3}/ka) intrusive | 200 ka | Total volume/Duration | |
| Altiplano-Puna volcanic complex, second pulse | 4.5 cubic kilometres per millennium (1.1 mi^{3}/ka) extrusive, 13.5–22.5 cubic kilometres per millennium (3.2–5.4 mi^{3}/ka) intrusive | 600 ka | Total volume/Duration | |
| Altiplano-Puna volcanic complex, third pulse | 4 cubic kilometres per millennium (0.96 mi^{3}/ka) extrusive, 12–20 cubic kilometres per millennium (2.9–4.8 mi^{3}/ka) intrusive | 600 ka | Total volume/Duration | |
| Altiplano-Puna volcanic complex, fourth pulse | 12 cubic kilometres per millennium (2.9 mi^{3}/ka) extrusive, 36–60 cubic kilometres per millennium (8.6–14.4 mi^{3}/ka) intrusive | 350 ka | Total volume/Duration | |
| Altiplano-Puna volcanic complex, after 4th pulse | 0.2 cubic kilometres per millennium (0.048 mi^{3}/ka) extrusive, 0.6–1 cubic kilometre per millennium (0.14–0.24 mi^{3}/ka) intrusive | 2400 ka | Total volume/Duration | |
| Arenal | 2.7 cubic kilometres per millennium (0.65 mi^{3}/ka) | 7,000 years | Total volume/Duration | |
| Aucanquilcha, Angulo | 0.015 cubic kilometres per millennium (0.0036 mi^{3}/ka) | 600-200 ka | Total volume/Duration | |
| Aucanquilcha, Azufrera | 0.16 cubic kilometres per millennium (0.038 mi^{3}/ka) | 1040–920 ka | Total volume/Duration | |
| Aucanquilcha, Cumbre Negra | 0.005 cubic kilometres per millennium (0.0012 mi^{3}/ka) | Over 150 ka | Total volume/Duration | |
| Aucanquilcha, Rodado | 0.09 cubic kilometres per millennium (0.022 mi^{3}/ka) | 950–850 ka | Total volume/Duration | |
| Aucanquilcha, edifice building phases | 0.16 cubic kilometres per millennium (0.038 mi^{3}/ka) | Over 200 ka | Total volume/Duration | |
| Aucanquilcha, later phases | 0.02 cubic kilometres per millennium (0.0048 mi^{3}/ka) | 800 ka | Total volume/Duration | |
| Broken Ridge | 1,000–2,000 cubic kilometres per millennium (240–480 mi^{3}/ka) | Between 88 and 89 million years ago | Total volume/Duration | |
| Camargo volcanic field | 0.026 cubic kilometres per millennium (0.0062 mi^{3}/ka) | | Total volume/Duration | |
| Caribbean large igneous province | 2,000 cubic kilometres per millennium (480 mi^{3}/ka) | Between 89 and 91 million years ago | Total volume/Duration | |
| Cascades | 300 cubic kilometres per millennium (72 mi^{3}/ka) | A single pluton plumbing system | Volume/Duration | |
| Central Volcanic Zone | 0.11 cubic kilometres per millennium (0.026 mi^{3}/ka) | Last 28 million years | | |
| Cerro Toledo, Jemez Caldera, intrusion | 35 cubic kilometres per millennium (8.4 mi^{3}/ka) | Over 0.33 million years | Magma supplied/duration | |
| Chimborazo | 0.5–0.7 cubic kilometres per millennium (0.12–0.17 mi^{3}/ka) | A single pluton plumbing system | Volume/Duration | |
| Chimborazo, Basal Edifice | 1–0.7 cubic kilometres per millennium (0.24–0.17 mi^{3}/ka) | 120-60 ka | Volume/Duration | |
| Chimborazo, Intermediary Edifice | 0.4–0.7 cubic kilometres per millennium (0.096–0.168 mi^{3}/ka) | 60–35 ka | Volume/Duration | |
| Chimborazo, Young Cone | 0.1 cubic kilometres per millennium (0.024 mi^{3}/ka) | 33–14 ka | Volume/Duration | |
| Cook Islands-Austral Islands | 11 cubic kilometres per millennium (2.6 mi^{3}/ka) | 25 million years | Total volume of edifices/age, neglecting subsidence and eroded material | |
| El Chichon | 0.5 cubic kilometres per millennium (0.12 mi^{3}/ka) | Past 8,000 years | Volume/Duration | |
| El Hierro | >0.4 cubic kilometres per millennium (0.096 mi^{3}/ka) | Juvenile stage | Total volume including sector collapses/Duration | |
| El Misti | 0.63 cubic kilometres per millennium (0.15 mi^{3}/ka) | Last 350 ka | Total volume/Duration | |
| Emperor Seamounts | 10 cubic kilometres per millennium (2.4 mi^{3}/ka) | 80 to 45 million years ago | Volume/Duration | |
| Farallon Negro | 0.31 cubic kilometres per millennium (0.074 mi^{3}/ka) | | Interpolated volume/Duration | |
| Hawaii | 210 cubic kilometres per millennium (50 mi^{3}/ka) | | Volume including subsidence/Duration | |
| Hawaiian Islands | 95 cubic kilometres per millennium (23 mi^{3}/ka) | 6 to 0 million years ago | Volume/Duration | |
| Hawaiian Ridge | 17 cubic kilometres per millennium (4.1 mi^{3}/ka) | 45 to 0 million years ago | Volume/Duration | |
| Imbabura | 0.13 cubic kilometres per millennium (0.031 mi^{3}/ka) | Past 35,000 years | Minimum total volume/Duration | |
| Klyuchevskaya Sopka | 40 cubic kilometres per millennium (9.6 mi^{3}/ka) | Last 6800 years | Total volume/Duration | |
| Lesser Antilles Volcanic Arc | 3 cubic kilometres per millennium (0.72 mi^{3}/ka) | Last 100 ka | Total volume/Duration | |
| Marquesas Islands | 21 cubic kilometres per millennium (5.0 mi^{3}/ka) | 7 million years | Total volume of edifices/age, neglecting subsidence and eroded material | |
| Meidob volcanic field, whole edifice | 0.2 cubic kilometres per millennium (0.048 mi^{3}/ka) | Between 7 and 0.3 million years ago | Total volume/Duration | |
| Menengai | 0.52 cubic kilometres per millennium (0.12 mi^{3}/ka) | | | |
| Methana | 0.001 cubic kilometres per millennium (0.00024 mi^{3}/ka) | | | |
| Morne Jacob, whole edifice | 0.040 ± 0.008 cubic kilometres per millennium (0.0096 ± 0.0019 mi^{3}/ka) | During, 3.7 ± 0.03 Myr | Total volume/Duration | |
| Morne Jacob, J1T | 0.107 cubic kilometres per millennium (0.026 mi^{3}/ka) | 5.14 ± 0.07 and 4.10 ± 0.06 Ma | Total volume (assuming basis at sea level)/Duration | |
| Morne Jacob, J2T | 0.02 cubic kilometres per millennium (0.0048 mi^{3}/ka) | Between 3.2 and 1.5 Ma | Total volume (subtracting J1T)/Duration | |
| Mount Adams volcanic field | 0.1 cubic kilometres per millennium (0.024 mi^{3}/ka) | Postglacial | | |
| Mount Etna | 1.6 ± 0.4 cubic kilometres per millennium (0.384 ± 0.096 mi^{3}/ka) | 330,000 years | Estimated volume/timespan | |
| Mount Etna, Timpe phase | 0.84 cubic kilometres per millennium (0.20 mi^{3}/ka) | 110,000 years | Estimated volume/timespan | |
| Mount Etna, Valle del Bove phase | 2.9 cubic kilometres per millennium (0.70 mi^{3}/ka) | 50,000 years | Estimated volume/timespan | |
| Mount Etna, Stratovolcano phase | 4.8 cubic kilometres per millennium (1.2 mi^{3}/ka) | 60,000 years | Estimated volume/timespan | |
| Mount Etna | 700 cubic kilometres per millennium (170 mi^{3}/ka) | | Based on the carbon dioxide output | |
| Mount Pelee, Mont Conil Ia | 0.04 cubic kilometres per millennium (0.0096 mi^{3}/ka)±0.01 | 543±8-189±3 ka | Edifice volume/Duration | |
| Mount Pelee, Mont Conil Ib | 0.36 cubic kilometres per millennium (0.086 mi^{3}/ka)±0.09 | | Edifice volume/Duration | |
| Mount Pelee, Paleo-Pelee | 0.26 cubic kilometres per millennium (0.062 mi^{3}/ka)±0.08 | 126±2–25 ka | Edifice volume/Duration | |
| Mount Pelee, Saint Vincent stage | 0.52 cubic kilometres per millennium (0.12 mi^{3}/ka)±0.20 | 25–9 ka | Edifice volume/Duration | |
| Mount Pelee, longterm | 0.13 cubic kilometres per millennium (0.031 mi^{3}/ka) | | Edifice volume/Duration | |
| Mount Pelee | 0.75 cubic kilometres per millennium (0.18 mi^{3}/ka) | Past 13,500 BP | Average eruption volume*Eruptions per lifespan | |
| Mount Sidley | 0.2 cubic kilometres per millennium (0.048 mi^{3}/ka) | | | |
| Nevado Tres Cruces | 0.13 cubic kilometres per millennium (0.031 mi^{3}/ka) | 1.5-0.03 mya | Volume/Duration | |
| Parinacota | 0.032 cubic kilometres per millennium (0.0077 mi^{3}/ka) | Since Late Pleistocene. | Volume/Duration | |
| Parinacota | 2.25 cubic kilometres per millennium (0.54 mi^{3}/ka) | Last 8,000 years. | Volume/Duration | |
| Parinacota, Young Cone prior to 8.1 ka | 10 cubic kilometres per millennium (2.4 mi^{3}/ka) | 1000–2000 years long. | | |
| Ruapehu | 0.6 cubic kilometres per millennium (0.14 mi^{3}/ka) | 250,000 years | Total volume/Lifespan | |
| Ruapehu, Mangawhero formation | 0.88 cubic kilometres per millennium (0.21 mi^{3}/ka) | | | |
| Ruapehu, Te Herenga formation | 0.93 cubic kilometres per millennium (0.22 mi^{3}/ka) | | | |
| Ruapehu, Waihianoa formation | 0.9 cubic kilometres per millennium (0.22 mi^{3}/ka) | | | |
| Ruapehu, Whakapapa formation | 0.17 cubic kilometres per millennium (0.041 mi^{3}/ka) | | | |
| Samoa | 33 cubic kilometres per millennium (7.9 mi^{3}/ka) | 3 million years | Total volume of edifices/age, neglecting subsidence and eroded material | |
| San Francisco Mountain | 0.2 cubic kilometres per millennium (0.048 mi^{3}/ka) | ≤ 400 ka | Total volume/Duration, including landslide removals | |
| San Francisco Mountain, main shield building stage | 0.3 cubic kilometres per millennium (0.072 mi^{3}/ka) | ~ 100 ka | Total volume/Duration, including landslide removals | |
| San Pedro de Tatara | 0.33–0.19 cubic kilometres per millennium (0.079–0.046 mi^{3}/ka) | | Total volume/Duration, including glacially eroded volumes | |
| Santa Maria | 0.12 cubic kilometres per millennium (0.029 mi^{3}/ka) | 103-35 ka | | |
| Santa Maria | 0.16 cubic kilometres per millennium (0.038 mi^{3}/ka) | 103 ka – 1902 | | |
| Sierra Nevada | 9.7 cubic kilometres per millennium (2.3 mi^{3}/ka) | A single pluton plumbing system | Volume of plutons/emplacement time | |
| Society Islands | 36 cubic kilometres per millennium (8.6 mi^{3}/ka) | 5 million years | Total volume of edifices/age, neglecting subsidence and eroded material | |
| Soufrière Hills | 0.17 cubic kilometres per millennium (0.041 mi^{3}/ka) | Last 174 ka | Total volume/Duration | |
| Stromboli | 10–20 cubic kilometres per millennium (2.4–4.8 mi^{3}/ka) | | Magma intrusion needed to create the measured sulfur dioxide emissions. | |
| Tancítaro | ≤0.19 cubic kilometres per millennium (0.046 mi^{3}/ka) | ≥ 550 ka | Total volume/Duration | |
| Tenerife | 0.3 cubic kilometres per millennium (0.072 mi^{3}/ka) | Long term average | Total volume/Duration | |
| Tenerife, Old Basaltic Series | 0.25–0.5 cubic kilometres per millennium (0.060–0.120 mi^{3}/ka) | 8-4 million years ago | Estimated volume/Duration | |
| Tenerife, Cañadas I volcano | 0.4 cubic kilometres per millennium (0.096 mi^{3}/ka) | 1 million years | Estimated volume/Duration | |
| Tenerife, Cañadas II volcano | 0.2–0.25 cubic kilometres per millennium (0.048–0.060 mi^{3}/ka) | 0.8 million years | Estimated volume/Duration | |
| Tenerife, Cordillera Dorsal | 1.5–1.25 cubic kilometres per millennium (0.36–0.30 mi^{3}/ka) | 0.2 million years | Estimated volume/Duration | |
| Tenerife, Teide-Pico Viejo | 0.75 cubic kilometres per millennium (0.18 mi^{3}/ka) | 0.2 million years | Estimated volume/Duration | |
| Tunupa-Huayrana | 0.43–0.93 cubic kilometres per millennium (0.10–0.22 mi^{3}/ka) | 240,000–90,000 years | | |
| Ubinas | 0.17–0.22 cubic kilometres per millennium (0.041–0.053 mi^{3}/ka) | < 376 ka | Cone volume/Duration | |
| Yellowstone | 2 cubic kilometres per millennium (0.48 mi^{3}/ka) | Long term average | | |
