= Los Nacimientos =

Los Nacimientos may refer to:

- Los Nacimientos, Antofagasta de la Sierra, Catamarca, Argentina
- Los Nacimientos, Belén, Catamarca, Argentina
