= CVZ =

CVZ may refer to

- Continuous Viewing Zone (Hubble Space Telescope; US NASA),
- Central Volcanic Zone (geology; see Andean Volcanic Belt).
