= Pan de Azúcar =

Pan de Azúcar (translated "sugar loaf" or "sugar bread") may refer to

- Pan de Azúcar or Wak'a Wallamarka, an archaeological site in Peru
- Pan de Azúcar National Park, a park in Chile
- Club Deportivo Pan de Azúcar, a football club in Panama
- Pan de Azúcar hill, in Peru
- Cerro Pan de Azúcar, a hill in Uruguay
- Pan de Azúcar, Uruguay, a city in Maldonado Department, Uruguay
- Pico Pan de Azúcar, a mountain in Venezuela
- Pan de Azucar, an island in the Philippines
- Pan de Azúcar, a volcano in Ecuador
- Pan de Azúcar, a mountain in the Sierra Nevada del Cocuy, Colombia
- Pan de Azúcar (dome), a lava dome group in Argentina
- Pan de Azúcar Formation, geological formation in Chile

== See also ==
- Sugarloaf (disambiguation)
