= Sugar Loaf Township, Arkansas =

Sugar Loaf Township, Arkansas may refer to:

- Sugar Loaf Township, Boone County, Arkansas
- Sugar Loaf Township, Cleburne County, Arkansas

== See also ==
- List of townships in Arkansas
- Sugarloaf Township (disambiguation)
