= Vicuña Pampa =

Argentine volcano

Coordinates: 26°50′S 67°00′W

Vicuña Pampa is a volcano in Argentina. It is part of the Central Volcanic Zone of the Andes and is located on the southeastern margin of the Puna plateau. It consists out of a 30 kilometres (19 mi) wide volcanic complex that is constructed by outwards-propagating lava flows. The centre of the complex is carved out by a 18 kilometres (11 mi) wide depression, which was originally interpreted as a caldera but appears to be erosional in origin. It is drained southward by the Rio Vicuña Pampa.

The volcano was constructed in two phases. In the first phase about 12 million years ago, the main volcanic edifice was constructed out of lava flows and probably formed a steep cone. After this stage, a phase of erosion, probably aided by higher orographic precipitation carved the present-day central depression. The second stage took place within the central depression and consists of lava domes.

== Geography and geomorphology ==
Vicuña Pampa is in the Catamarca Province of Argentina, 100 kilometres (62 mi) north of the town of Belen. The volcano lies in the Central Andes, more specifically on the southeastern margin of the Puna plateau where a steep topographic step forms the edge of the plateau.

The volcano is part of the Central Volcanic Zone of the Andes, which extends itself across southern Peru and Bolivia and northern Chile and Argentina. The Central Volcanic Zone since the Miocene has been volcanically active with large ignimbrite eruptions, especially in the more northerly Altiplano-Puna volcanic complex and in the southerly Galán and Luingo caldera systems.

Vicuña Pampa is a volcanic complex with a diameter of about 30 kilometres (19 mi), with flanks that gently slope outward. Lava flows make up the bulk of the edifice and are intercalated with conglomerates and breccias. These lava flows propagated outward away from the centre of the volcanic complex, reaching lengths of about 17 kilometres (11 mi) or even 19 kilometres (12 mi). Some short lava flows were fed by a large dyke swarm that is intruded into the edifice, and which crops out within the central depression of the volcano. Several different types of dykes have been observed there.

A 1,200 metres (3,900 ft) deep 18 kilometres (11 mi) wide central depression is open towards the southeast. Originally it was interpreted as a collapse caldera, but no evidence of ignimbrites or other features of such calderas were identified; it is thus today considered an erosional landform. The basement beneath the volcano and some volcanic units are exposed within the central depression. The depression has a flat floor with landforms such as alluvial fans, and it drains southward as the Rio Vicuña Pampa stream; the volcano is named after the river. The Rio Vicuña Pampa is one of the few rivers that have succeeded in invading the Puna-Altiplano high plateau; among the others are the San Juan del Oro River, the Choqueyapu River and the Rio Consata the latter two both in Bolivia.

Within the central depression, lava flows and breccia crop out in part in the form of lava necks and lava plugs, as well as several breccia outcrops called the Cerro Morado Epiclastic Succession and the Cerro Bayo, La Cumbre and Nacimientos Breccias. The Cerro Bayo unit is formed by lava domes and associated block-and-ash flows in the southwestern segment of the depression.

== Geology ==
Off the western coast of South America, the Nazca Plate subducts beneath the South America Plate at a rate of 7–8 centimetres per year (2.8–3.1 in/year), but was faster in the past.

The Puna is the site of many volcanoes, including large caldera volcanoes such as Cerro Blanco and Galán. Such calderas form when volcanic edifices collapse and leave elliptical or circular depressions; not all depressions within volcanic edifices form in such a process, however.

Vicuña Pampa is constructed on top of a basement formed by granitic and metamorphic rocks that date back to Precambrian to Cretaceous times; together with some other regional volcanic centres the Vicuña Pampa volcano seems to coincide with the demarcation between the basement and Ordovician metamorphic sediments. A number of sediment-filled basins are found south of the volcanic complex and are in part filled by volcanic sediments. Several faults occur in the area, including the Vicuña Pampa fault which has offset part of the volcanic complex and crosses its eastern sector. The volcano is part of a lineament with the Filo Colorado centre farther southeast.

=== Composition ===
Volcanic rocks at Vicuña Pampa consist of basalt, basaltic andesite, andesite, trachyandesite to trachydacite. The rocks contain phenocrysts of amphibole, biotite, clinopyroxene, olivine, orthopyroxene, plagioclase and quartz. The volcanic complex has been investigated for mining opportunities.

== Eruption history ==
Vicuña Pampa was constructed in two separate stages. The first stage occurred about 12 million years ago, it generated the various necks and lower lava flows which crop out in the central depression. Most likely, this phase of volcanism took the form of a rapid pulse and was then subject to intense erosion, giving rise to the large volume breccia deposits. This erosion phase was followed by another more steady phase of volcanism that constructed most of the volcanic complex, including the lava flows on its outer flanks. The stratigraphic relationships have been interpreted as reflecting the development of a steep volcanic cone, followed by lateral eruptions that enlarged the edifice. Dates obtained on the older complex shows ages of 12.19 and 12.41 million years ago for the first stage.

Between the two stages, intense erosion generated the central depression and cut deeply into the first stage volcanic edifice. This depression was created by complex erosion, not by large scale explosive eruptions, as there is no evidence of the latter. The climate was wetter in the region at that time, probably because at that time orographic precipitation was focused on the eastern margin of the Puna and thus allowed much more rapid erosion than the present-day arid climate. Material eroded during that time was transported by the Rio Vicuña Pampa into the foreland. Activity of local fault systems and the ability of the central depression to centralize runoff may have further aided in the erosion process.

In the second stage of activity, lava domes and dykes were emplaced within the depression, which contained waterbodies at that time; traces of these waterbodies have been identified in the second stage volcanics. This late stage may have occurred during the late Miocene.
