= Chimpa =

Volcano in Argentina

Coordinates: 24°00′S 66°08′W

Chimpa is a volcano in Argentina, close to the border between the Jujuy Province and the Salta Province. The volcano is of Miocene age, one date given being 12 million years ago and another is 7 million years ago.

== Geomorphology and geology ==
Chimpa has two summits, the 4,856 metres (15,932 ft) high Cerro Chimpa and the 4,796 metres (15,735 ft) or 4,774 metres (15,663 ft) high Cerro Cajón. The 2 kilometres (1.2 mi) wide west-northwest trending Casana valley separates the two. The volcanic edifice was constructed in two stages, the first consisting of explosive and the second of effusive activity. The explosive activity generated ignimbrites and pyroclastic flows. On top of these, many poorly preserved lava flows were emplaced in a radial pattern and constitute three separate formations. The explosive stage formed the Basal Unit, which consists of ignimbrites that originally constructed a shield but features no indication of a caldera, probably due to a "boiling-over"-like dynamic of the eruption. After this stage of a rather broad volcanic edifice, a more concentrated volcanic activity took place. The post-explosive activity has been subdivided into two units, the Cajon Unit formed by lava domes and block-and-ash flows and the blocky lava flows of the Chimpa Unit. This unit is the last activity of the volcano, which is presently dormant. Even if the volcano were to erupt again, the region is sparsely populated.

The Casana valley was produced by the combined effects of faulting, erosion and hydrothermal activity. It is delimited by scarps generated by tectonic activity. It features evidence of a sector collapse that removed the volcanic vents. Debris from this collapse consists of large toreva blocks and debris avalanche deposits that are located within the Casana valley. The collapse may have occurred shortly after the last eruption, or after a significant timespan. It began as an eastward collapse that was followed within a brief timespan by a westward collapse. The collapses emplaced their debris within the Casana valley and collapse debris covers an area of about 10 square kilometres (3.9 sq mi).

=== Composition ===
The volcanic rocks are of basaltic andesite to andesite composition, defining a potassium-rich calc-alkaline suite. They contain phenocrysts of biotite, hornblende, ilmenite, magnetite, orthopyroxene, plagioclase and quartz. Mafic inclusions occur in some eruption products. Rocks from within the core region of the volcano bear evidence of intense hydrothermal alteration, which weakened the edifice and conditioned its collapse. The hydrothermal alteration did not occur in all units and at all times.

== Regional ==
Off the western coast of South America, the Nazca Plate subducts beneath the South American Plate. This subduction process is responsible for the volcanic activity of the Andes. The basement of the region is formed by various formations of Precambrian to Tertiary age, some of which crop out around the volcano. This basement is cut by various faults, which mark an uplift that forms the Creston Alto de La Aguada east of Chimpa volcano, as well as the Calama-Olacapato-El Toro lineament and associated faults which runs south of the Chimpa volcano. They have localized the formation of volcanoes along its path and also influenced the activity of Chimpa. Cerro Rumio is another volcano which crops out south of Chimpa and is in part buried by Chimpa's deposits.

Chimpa lies in the Puna, a high plateau that began to form in the Eocene-Oligocene. The geologic basement consists of the Neoproterozoic Puncoviscana Formation, which is overlaid by Paleozoic to Paleogene sediments and Miocene volcanic rocks. Volcanoes there are part of the back-arc region of the Andean Central Volcanic Zone, where volcanism is caused by the subduction of the Nazca Plate underneath the South America Plate. Puna volcanism took place in two episodes, one between 17.15-5.3 million years ago and a second during the last 1.5 million years.
