= Pocho (disambiguation) =

Pocho is a pejorative term for an American of Mexican descent. It may also refer to:

- a Hawaiian Pidgin English term for a person of Portuguese descent

== Animals ==
- Pocho (crocodile), a Costa Rican pet crocodile

== Geography ==
- Pocho volcanic field, a volcanic field in Argentina

== Literature ==
- Pocho (novel), a novel by José Antonio Villarreal

== Music ==
- Pocho Aztlan, an album by Brujeria

== People ==
- Federico Insúa, Argentine footballer
- Ezequiel Lavezzi, Argentine footballer
- Matteo Lavelli, Italian footballer
- Pocho La Pantera, Argentine cumbia singer

== Places ==
- Pocho Department, a department of Córdoba Province in Argentina

== See also ==
- Poncho (disambiguation)
- Poco (disambiguation)
