= Poco =

Poco or POCO may refer to:

- Postcolonialism
- In musical notation, qualifier meaning "a little"
- Poco (band), an American country rock band formed in 1968
  - Poco (album), a 1970 eponymous album
- Plain Old CLR Object, term used by developers targeting the Common Language Runtime of the .NET Framework
- POCO C++ Libraries, collection of open-source, C++, class libraries for network centric applications
- "PoCo", a nickname for Port Coquitlam, British Columbia, Canada
- Poco (smartphone), a smartphone brand
- Poco Mandasawu, Mountain in Flores Island, Indonesia
- Poco (chimpanzee) (born circa 1981), a rescued chimpanzee
- Poco, the playable character in Woody Poco, a Japanese video game released in 1986
- Poco, a character from mobile game Brawl Stars

== See also ==
- Pocho (disambiguation)
- Poco-poco, an Indonesian mass folk dance
