= Luingo =

Caldera in the Andes of Argentina

Coordinates: 26°10′S 66°30′W

Luingo is a caldera in the Andes of Argentina. It is located southeast of the Galan caldera. The caldera is not recognizable from satellite images and is associated with the Pucarilla-Cerro Tipillas volcanic complex.

Volcanic activity at Luingo occurred before a phase of crustal thickening in the region. It generated two major ignimbrites named Alto de Las Lagunas an Pucarilla. Two further ignimbrites named Luingo I and Luingo II were found within the caldera and are associated with caldera collapse. A phase of effusive activity succeeded the caldera formation.

== Geography and structure ==
Luingo lies in northwestern Argentina, on the Argentine Puna and just west of the Eastern Cordillera. The Pucarilla-Cerro Tipillas volcanic complex is associated with Luingo, and the Galan caldera lies 20 kilometres (12 mi) northwest of Luingo. Luingo forms the oldest and southeasternmost caldera of the Puna.

Luingo is part of the Central Volcanic Zone (CVZ). About 20 major calderas are found in the CVZ, especially in the region between 21 and 25° southern latitude where the Altiplano-Puna volcanic complex can be found. These ignimbrites, lava flows and subvolcanic bodies. Smaller ignimbrites are found in the southern part of the CVZ.

The Pucarilla-Cerro Tipillas volcanic complex is formed by pyroclastic flows. Lava flows are subordinate. Luingo is the eruptive centre of the Pucarilla-Cerro Tipillas volcanic complex. Unlike other calderas such as Galan, Luingo is not visible from satellite images; its location and existence has been inferred from analysis of the facies and morphology. This caldera is the source of the Alto de Las Lagunas and Pucarilla ignimbrites and is itself filled by the two Luingo ignimbrites. The caldera has a diameter of 13 by 19 kilometres (8.1 mi × 11.8 mi). Based on the volume of its products a downsag depth of 0.5 kilometres (0.31 mi) has been calculated. Luingo has generated ignimbrites that cover a surface area of 888 square kilometres (343 sq mi).

A salar is found within the Luingo caldera. The Luingo River originates close to the caldera and the Los Patos River flows north of the caldera.

== Geology ==
Volcanism of the Altiplano is caused by the collision between the Nazca Plate and the South America Plate. Various phenomena caused a thickening of the crust in the Altiplano region; such thickening however postdates volcanic activity at Luingo and thus the volcano was unaffected by its chemical effects. Between 8 and 3 million years ago the volcanic arc moved towards the east due to subduction eroding the forearc and 6 million years ago voluminous ignimbritic volcanism commenced. Since 3 million years ago, ignimbritic volcanism is aligned both along the Chile-Argentina border and a lineament including Galan, Cerro Blanco and Incapillo.

The composition of Luingo magmas has been modelled. The closest correspondence is obtained by assuming the mixing crustal material with mafic magmas in a ratio 1:4. Subsequently, the crust became thicker in the region, thus the Galan ignimbrites formed from magmas where the crustal material:mafic magma ratio is about 1:1.

=== Regional ===
Luingo is located in the Puna-Altiplano, a high plateau with an average altitude of 3,700 metres (12,100 ft). This plateau covers a surface area of about 500,000 square kilometres (190,000 sq mi) and contains internally draining basins as well as volcanoes.

The Laguna Blanca Formation is a dacitic tuff formation of late Quaternary age that covers large parts of the Puna. In the region of Luingo, it has been associated with this volcano. A number of other rock formations are interpreted to have been formed by Luingo.

=== Local ===
The basement upon which the Luingo deposits lie is formed by two separate structures. The first is a sediment formation of fluvial origin, which is known as the Angastaco Formation. The second is a basement proper formed by granite and metamorphic rocks of Neoproterozoic to Paleozoic age.

A set of faults delimit the Colomé–Hualfín Valley that contains most of Pucarilla-Cerro Tipillas eruption products; indeed at the time of Luingo's activity the Jasimaná fault formed a barrier to its eruption products. This fault belongs to a group of faults which are part of this region of the Andes, which has been highly tectonically active since the Proterozoic.

== Eruptive history ==
The Alto de Las Lagunas ignimbrite is the oldest eruptive unit of Luingo and reaches a thickness of 80 metres (260 ft). It was previously named the Hornblendic welded tuff and dated 15.83 ± 0.44 – 14.22 ± 0.33 million years ago; a younger date of 13.52 ± 0.12 million years ago has been obtained on it. This ignimbrite is pink-grey and contains lapilli and crystal-rich fiamme. Minerals include alkaline feldspar, amphibole, biotite, plagioclase and quartz with accessory minerals such as apatite, iron-titanium oxides, sphene and zircon. Also present are granitic lithics. Its total volume is 2 cubic kilometres (0.48 cu mi) and ash falls in northwestern Argentina have been correlated to it.

The Pucarilla ignimbrite was erupted 12.11 ± 0.11 million years ago. It is a dacitic welded tuff with a high crystal and moderate pumice content. Minerals include biotite, clinopyroxene, plagioclase and quartz with accessory minerals such as apatite, magnetite, sphene and zircon. This ignimbrite has been subdivided into the pink Jasimana unit that covers an extensive surface area, the lower witish-grey Hualfin unit and the grey upper Arremo unit. The Pucarilla ignimbrite has a minimum volume of 20 cubic kilometres (4.8 cu mi).

The Luingo I ignimbrite is dacitic and covered by a thick breccia layer known as the Luingo breccia. It has undergone some hydrothermal alteration that gives it a greenish colour. The breccia is formed by granitic rocks. Above it lies the Luingo II ignimbrite which is also dacitic. Both ignimbrites are welded and rich in crystals. Minerals include apatite, biotite, clinopyroxene, plagioclase, quartz and titanite. All these structures formed during one event. When the Luingo I ignimbrite was erupted, caldera collapse happened and formed the Luingo breccia from debris. Afterwards, this debris was buried by the Luingo II ignimbrite. The ignimbrites outside of the caldera formed the Pucarilla ignimbrite. This eruption from fissure vents was characterized by low fountaining of ignimbrites and a high mass flow, resulting in hot flows that reached distances of 35 kilometres (22 mi). Probably under the influence of faults that delimit the current caldera, the caldera underwent a trapdoor-like collapse. After the caldera collapse, hydrothermal activity as well as the extrusion of lava domes occurred. Minerals produced by alteration include calcite, chlorite, epidote, kaolinite, rutile and sericite.

Effusive activity occurred during the upper Miocene in the area. This effusive activity has been dated 7.59 ± 0.03 and 7.6 ± 0.02 million years ago. Its composition ranges from trachyandesite to trachydacite and is significantly hydrothermally altered. While this activity was not accompanied by explosive activity, it is possible that traces of such will be found in the area in the future.
