= Cochiquito Volcanic Group =

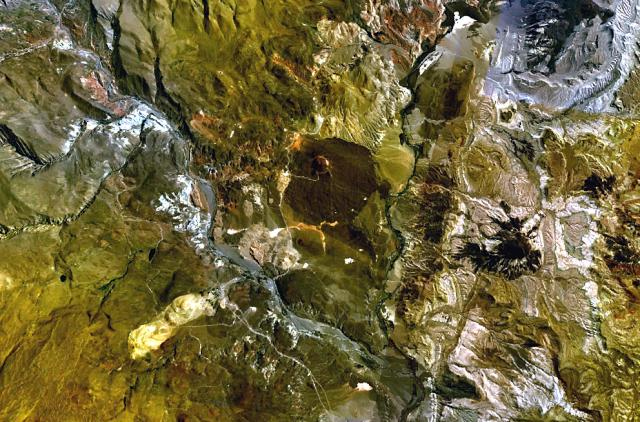
- Cochiquito volcano (brown, in centre). Image taken by NASA Landsat satellite.

Highest point
- Elevation: 1,435 m (4,708 ft)
- Coordinates: 36°46′S 69°49′W

Geography
- Location: Argentina
- Parent range: Andes

Geology
- Rock age: Holocene
- Mountain type: Stratovolcanoes
- Last eruption: Unknown

The Cochiquito Volcanic Group is a small volcanic group of volcanoes north of the town of Buta Ranquil in Argentina. The main peak is Volcán Cochiquito, a stratovolcano of estimated Pleistocene–Holocene age. There are eight satellite cones in the volcanic field, including Volcán Sillanegra (a pyroclastic cone complex) and Volcán Ranquil del Sur (a small stratovolcano).

== See also ==
- List of volcanoes in Argentina

== Sources ==
- "Cochiquito Volcanic Group". Global Volcanism Program. Smithsonian Institution.
