= Risco Plateado =

Mountain in Argentina

- Location within Argentina

Highest point
- Elevation: 4,999 m (16,401 ft)
- Prominence: 1,602 m (5,256 ft)
- Listing: Ultra
- Coordinates: 34°55′06″S 69°59′39″W

Geography
- Location: Argentina
- Parent range: Andes

Geology
- Mountain type: Stratovolcano
- Last eruption: Unknown

Risco Plateado is a stratovolcano in Argentina, with an elevation of 4,999 metres (16,401 ft) above sea level. With a prominence of 1,602 metres (5,256 ft), it is one of the many ultra prominent peaks in the Andes. The equilibrium line altitude of the volcano lies at an altitude of 3,800 metres (12,500 ft).

This stratovolcano has a 4 kilometres (2.5 mi) wide caldera with eruptive centres on its northeastern and southwestern margins. These centres are aligned on a northeast-trending fracture that also includes a monogenetic centre 8 kilometres (5.0 mi) northeast of the caldera (GVP). The volcano has produced long lava flows, although the more proximal parts of the flow were later degraded by glaciation. The volcano has been assigned a Holocene age given the young appearance of some of its eruption products. The volcanism was at first dacitic and later changed to basaltic andesite (GVP).

== See also ==
- List of volcanoes in Argentina
- List of Ultras of South America
