= Pirurayo =

Argentine volcano in Jujuy province

Coordinates: 22°21′S 65°52′W

Pirurayo is a volcano in the Pirurayo range, Jujuy Province of Argentina.

It is formed by several sequences of block and ash flows with subordinate lava flows which reach thicknesses of 640 metres (2,100 ft). They were erupted from possibly two vents, although the intense tectonic deformation makes it impossible to tell. These vents probably generated a compound volcano consisting of lava domes, which repeatedly grew and collapsed.

Pirurayo has erupted andesite and dacite, which belong to the potassium-rich volcanics series. They probably formed from a mafic magma, which underwent assimilation of crustal materials and fractional crystallization. Volcaniclastic rocks from Pirurayo form part of the regional Moreta formation. Volcanic activity occurred between 28 ± 3 and 20 ± 2 million years ago. The Pirurayo rocks were later influenced by faulting and hydrothermally altered.
