= Trocon =

Mountain in Argentina

Highest point
- Elevation: approx. 2,500 m (8,200 ft)
- Coordinates: 37.75°S 69.88°W

Geography
- Location: Argentina
- Parent range: Andes

Geology
- Rock age: Holocene ?
- Mountain type: Lava domes
- Last eruption: Unknown

Trocon is a lava dome complex in Argentina. It has two summit craters and a pyroclastic cone. It is of estimated Pleistocene-Holocene age. The complex rises from an altitude of 1,968 metres (6,457 ft) and has two summit craters. The volume of the edifice is ill-defined, ranging 3.6–84.9 cubic kilometres (0.86–20.37 cu mi). Lava flows extend eastward from a pyroclastic cone.

== See also ==
- List of volcanoes in Argentina
