= Arizaro volcanic field =

Group of volcanoes west of Salar de Arizaro, Argentina

Coordinates: 24°45′00″S 68°02′30″W

- Location within Argentina

Highest point

Arizaro volcanic field is a group of volcanoes west of the Salar de Arizaro.

== Geography and geomorphology ==
The volcanic field lies above the western shores of the Salar de Arizaro. It consists of numerous Pleistocene basaltic andesite lava flows, as well as cinder cones with Holocene basaltic lava flows. Most centres are roughly aligned in northeast–southwest direction; they are named Estación Caipe, Panqueque, Chuculaqui y Samenta, Medialuna, Puesto Flores, Vega de Samenta and Pie de Samenta. Most of them lie on the slopes of the terrain west of Salar de Arizaro, except Medialuna which is in the salar and Panqueque which is on its edge. Panqueque is 60 metres (200 ft) high and covers an area of 3 square kilometres (1.2 sq mi); it consists of a body of lava flows emitted from several centres—the westernmost centre being the most important—overlying pyroclastic deposits that crop out at the edge of the lava flows. The lava flows have well-developed flow shapes like ogives. When it erupted, Panqueque tore up rocks from the underlying substrate, like sediments, which are now mixed in the volcanic rocks. Medialuna is a 15 metres (49 ft) high, 390 metres (1,280 ft) long crescent-shaped volcanic structure that opens to the east. Both centres formed in phreatomagmatic eruptions, which in the case of Panqueque transitioned over time into effusive activity.

The volcanic field lies in the Puna, a high plateau generated by the subduction of the Nazca Plate beneath the South America Plate. The terrain consists mainly of Miocene volcaniclastic rocks with a single outcrop of Ordovician granodiorite. Parts of the area are covered by Quaternary alluvium and conglomerates. The basement rocks are influenced by normal faulting and the region is criss-crossed by ridges.

== Geology and eruption history ==
The volcanism in the field has been explained by lithospheric delamination, a process by which part of the lower lithosphere founders into the mantle. Such a process is accompanied by uplift of the abovelying crust and often by volcanism of mainly small volume. Seismic imagery has been used to argue for the existence of delaminated crust in the mantle above the downgoing Nazca Plate slab beneath the Arizaro region. The Arizaro volcanic field is part of a wider area of mafic volcanism in the Puna, which includes about 250 centres, some with Holocene activity.

The volcanoes of the Arizaro field are formed by lava flows and scoria. The dominant rock type is basaltic andesite. The age of the lavas has been determined by argon-argon dating. Estación Caipe is 80,000±60,000 years old, Panqueque 220,000±70,000 years, Chuculaqui y Samenta (the largest centre) has ages ranging 2,1±0.3-3,4±0.1 million years and Puesto Flores 244,000±99,000 and 130,000±10,000 years. The 2.52 ± 0.05 million years old lava flow at Chuculaqui y Samenta shows evidence of younger faulting. It is considered the second-least dangerous volcano in Argentina.

== See also ==
- Salar de Arizaro
- Andean Volcanic Belt
