= Farallon Negro (volcano) =

Argentinian volcano

Coordinates: 27°15′S 66°33′W

Farallon Negro is a volcano in the Catamarca province of Argentina. Active between about 9-8 million years ago, it was formerly a stratovolcano or a multi-vent volcano. Eventually, erosion removed most of the volcano and exposed the underlying structure including subvolcanic intrusions.

The remnants of the volcano are now the sites of mining operations.

== Geography and structure ==
Farallon Negro is located in the Argentine Catamarca province, in the Sierra de Belén and north of the Pipanaco basin. It may be the largest volcanic field in the Argentine foreland. Nearby towns include Andalgala, which is approximately 30 kilometres (19 mi) south of the Agua Rica deposit, Belén, which is approximately 100 kilometres (62 mi) southwest of the volcano, and Tucumán, which is approximately 300 kilometres (190 mi) northeast. The local climate is arid and temperatures range from 0–35 °C (32–95 °F).

It is located between the tectonic region of the Sierras Pampeanas and the Puna. Volcanic activity in this region 200 kilometres (120 mi) east of the principal volcanic arc is of unknown origin and was widespread in the past. Said volcanism took place between 12 and 5 mya.

Farallon Negro is likely a stratovolcano which has been degraded by erosion, resulting in the exposure of intrusive bodies. Before the erosion, the volcano may have been over 6,000 metres (20,000 ft) high and covering a surface area of 700 square kilometres (270 sq mi). Another theory suggests that Farallon Negro was a multi-vent complex. The basement altitude is about 2,600 metres (8,500 ft). These include the Agua Rica and Bajo de la Alumbrera porphyry centres and the Agua Tapada and Bajo el Durazno intrusions. Most of the volcanic products of Farallon Negro are lava flows and breccia. The volcanic vent for most of the Farallon Negro products appears to be in the general area of Alto de la Blenda, suggesting that it is the location of the vent. Volcanic units at Durazno are somewhat different from those in the main complex. Lava domes are sometimes surrounded by ash and block flows.

Intrusive volcanics form much of the exposed complex. In Bayo de la Alumbrera, a dacite complex is embedded within pyroclastic rocks and trachyandesites. Bayo de la Alumbrera was originally buried beneath a 2,500 metres (8,200 ft) high volcanic pile. Around the Alto de la Blenda monzonite, a number of stocks (0.1–1 kilometre (0.062–0.621 mi) wide) and dikes originate, which indicates it may be a remnant of the conduit. Magma mixing appears to have occurred during formation of some stocks; in Alto de la Alumbrera, felsic and later mafic rocks were formed. Several dykes and stocks were injected into andesite during the formation of Bajo de la Alumbrera. Many of these stocks have suffered hydrothermal alteration extending into surrounding rocks shortly after their formation including propylitic alteration, but the later stocks show no evidence of alteration. This pattern probably occurred because strong volcanic activity during the earliest intrusions leaked away fluids before they could trigger alteration. When volcanic activity dropped, trapped fluids could then initiate hydrothermal alteration. This probably coincided with a change in the local stress regime that reduced volcanic activity. Faults and fractures have influenced the alteration. In Bajo de la Alumbrera, this alteration has given place to magnetite and anhydrite inclusions which indicated the rocks were highly oxidized. Phyllic (pyrite-quartz-sericite) and potassic (biotite-orthoclase) alteration is noticeable in satellite images of Bajo de la Alumbrera. Agua Rica, another exposed deposit, is cut by the Quebradas Mina valley. It is subdivided in the Seca and Trampeadero porphyries. Two diatremes are also found, one of which is named El Espanto.

Rock chemistry and isotope analysis suggests that at first the Farallon Negro system was not underpinned by a magma chamber. Starting around 8.5 mya, a heterogeneous magma chamber appears to have been established, with an increasing content of felsic rocks at its roof. A minimum volume of 7 cubic kilometres (1.7 cu mi) is required to explain the formation of the Alumbrera deposit. This magma chamber probably had a heterogeneous composition.

== Geology ==
Subduction of the Nazca Plate between 28° and 33° southern latitude flattened starting 18 million years ago, causing arc volcanism to propagate to the Sierras Pampeanas. Subduction of a segment of the Juan Fernández Ridge may have triggered this shallowing. 10 million years ago, volcanism ceased in the main Andean chain in this segment, probably because the mantle wedge was thinned by the flattening of the subduction. North and south of this segment subduction is steeper and volcanism persists to the present day.

Farallon Negro is located in the border zone between the flat subduction zone and the zone of steeper subduction farther north that has generated the Central Volcanic Zone. A number of volcanoes in this transitional zone are found on northwest trending lineaments; this includes Cerro Negro de Chorillos, Farallon Negro, Galán and Cerro Tuzgle. The Tucuman fault zone is located in the area.

=== Local ===
The basement in the Farallon Negro area of the Sierras Pampeanas are schists and gneisses of deep water origin with an intruded batholith of Ordovician-Silurian age. This plutonic activity coincided with the collision of South America with eastern North America during that time. The Sierras Pampeanas are formed by several chains of mountains of Proterozoic-Paleozoic age with valleys separating them. During the Pliocene-Pleistocene, separate basement blocks were upfolded. These geological patterns are similar to the Laramide orogeny in North America and may be a general pattern of mountain building over flat subduction. During the Miocene, red beds were deposited in the area forming the El Morterito Formation that reaches a thickness of 200 metres (660 ft). This formation was probably formed in episodic events such as flash floods. Rocks of the Paleozoic basement beneath Farallon Negro contain amphibolite, mica schist, phyllite and quartzite.

Farallon Negro itself is found between the Sierra de Aconquija in the east and the Sierra de Quilmes in the north. Both of these are Paleozoic basement blocks with Farallon Negro found in a depression between these. The formation of this depression may have occurred after the deposition of red bed sediments, seeing as they form thin layers while the Farallon Negro volcanics are over 2 kilometres (1.2 mi). The volcanites were erupted through a crystalline basement including batholiths and metasedimentary rock.

=== Geologic record ===
Farallon Negro is extensively eroded, almost down to its Paleozoic basement. Erosion took place between the Miocene and the Pliocene considering that volcanic rocks are buried beneath Pliocene conglomerates.

=== Composition ===
Basaltic andesite and other andesites constitute the bulk of Farallon Negro volcanisms. Dacites and basalt also occur. The Bajo de la Alumbrera porphyry deposit is found in shoshonite. They are heterogeneous in composition, with several phases dominated by hornblende, plagioclase and pyroxene. Magnetite and biotite are also present. Generally, early rocks are mafic and the late ones intermediate or silicic. Magma mixing may have played a role in the formation of the rocks; specifically andesites formed from the mixing of basaltic-lamprophyric melts with dacitic-rhyolitic ones within andesitic rocks. Overall composition is potassium-rich calc-alkaline. Isotope compositions are typical for a mature volcanic arc. The total quantity of produced magma is about 300 cubic kilometres (72 cu mi).

The bottom of the volcanic pile forms breccias that were presumably emplaced by flood-like flows. Sedimentary rocks, dykes and lava flows are also found. In the upper layers, lava flows and lava domes are found. Again there are also sedimentary rocks. Some deposits may be debris flow deposits, phreatomagmatic deposits are also found.

Alteration products have been analyzed at Bajo de la Alumbrera. Gold-containing pyrite and chalcopyrite, bornite and enargite are the main gold containing minerals. Hydrothermal orthoclase and quartz as well as hydrothermal assemblages of anhydrite, biotite and magnetite are also found. An earlier argillic (clay) cap over the deposit was eroded away. Alto de la Blenda has shown the presence of chalcopyrite, galena, pyrite, sphalerite, tennantite-tetrahedrite. Agua Rica displays covellite, enargite, galena, marcasite, molybdenite, pyrite, sphalerite, sulfur and tetrahedrite, formed first as a porphyry that was subsequently modified by hydrothermal piping.

Some mineralization was directed by fluids which exhaled from the magma chamber into surrounding rocks after a period of volcanic rest. Inclusions in rocks demonstrate that these fluids included brine and sulfide-rich fluids. These sulfide containing brines and fluids extracted much of the gold and copper from the bulk rocks, causing them to be poorer in Au and Cu than the melts. These fluids probably had temperatures of over 600 °C (1,112 °F) and formed under rocks about 3 kilometres (1.9 mi) thick.

== Eruptive history ==
The oldest age reported for a lava flow in Bayo el Durazno is 9.4±0.3 mya, but undatable units stratigraphically older than this flow are present. Until 8.05±0.37 mya, activity in the central cone occurred, and Cerro Durazno was active between 8.0±0.2 and 7.27±0.35 mya.

Of the intrusions, the Tampa Tampa andesites between Alto de la Blenda and Bajo el Durazno formed first at 9.0±0.2 mya. Bajo el Durazno formed a porphyry at 8.39±0.18 mya. The Las Casitas rhyolite and the Chilca andesite porphyry have comparable ages of 8.0±0.12 and 8.0±0.11 mya. The Alto de la Blenda stock was formed 7.55±0.3 mya. Agua Tapada was formed 7.35±0.16 mya. Las Pampitas was emplaced 7.22±0.28 mya. Bajo de San Lukas was emplaced 7.1 mya. 6.98±0.08–6.78±0.15 the Bajo de la Alumbrera intrusion was formed. 6.18±0.05 and 6.04±0.07 mya the Loma Morada and Macho Muerto rocks were emplaced. The Quebrada de los Leones rhyolites are the youngest intrusions but aren't dated isotopically.

Evidence indicates that in the beginning the Farallon Negro volcano grew rapidly, at least in the northwest sector and then growth petered out. Towards the end of activity around 7.3 mya a caldera collapse may have occurred. Composition of the eruptive products changed over the lifespan of the system. The main volcanism (9.2–6.8 mya) was andesitic-dacitic. During the intrusive phase (8.0–6.2 mya) magma was initially basaltic andesite and later rhyolite.

== Mining ==
A mine of copper and gold is found within Bajo de la Alumbrera, opened in July 1997. It is estimated that it will be one of the ten largest copper mines in the world in full production, and one of the largest gold mines in South America. Some copper mining began already in 1970s but a major open pit mine was opened in February 1998. Two mines are also operated in Alto de la Alumbrera, the Farallon Negro mine opened in 1978 and Alto de la Alumbrera opened in 1986.

It is estimated that Bajo de la Alumbrera contains 3,000,000 tonnes (3.0×10^{9} kg; 6.6×10^{9} lb) of copper. The mineralization may have originated in mafic magmas. The formation process of these deposits is insofar different from that of other Andean porphyry deposits as it was formed by several hydrothermal systems that were separated only by a few million years, while e.g. the copper porphyry El Salvador formed during episodic magmatic activity.

== Sources ==
- von Quadt, A.; Erni, M.; Martinek, K.; Moll, M.; Peytcheva, I.; Heinrich, C. A. (1 July 2011). "Zircon crystallization and the lifetimes of ore-forming magmatic-hydrothermal systems". Geology. 39 (8): 731–734. Bibcode:2011Geo....39..731V. doi:10.1130/G31966.1.
- ALLMENDINGER, RICHARD W. (1986). "Tectonic development, southeastern border of the Puna Plateau, northwestern Argentine Andes". Geological Society of America Bulletin. 97 (9): 1070. Bibcode:1986GSAB...97.1070A. doi:10.1130/0016-7606(1986)97<1070:TDSBOT>2.0.CO;2.
- Ulrich, T.; Gunther, D.; Heinrich, C. A. (1 December 2001). "The Evolution of a Porphyry Cu-Au Deposit, Based on LA-ICP-MSAnalysis of Fluid Inclusions: Bajo de la Alumbrera, Argentina". Economic Geology. 96 (8): 1743–1774. Bibcode:2001EcGeo..96.1743U. doi:10.2113/gsecongeo.96.8.1743.
- Harris, A. C.; Golding, S. D.; White, N. C. (29 March 2006). "Bajo de la Alumbrera Copper-Gold Deposit: Stable Isotope Evidence for a Porphyry-Related Hydrothermal System Dominated by Magmatic Aqueous Fluids". Economic Geology. 100 (5): 863–886. doi:10.2113/gsecongeo.100.5.863.
- Putz, Hubert; Paar, Werner H.; Topa, Dan (June 2009). "A contribution to the knowledge of the mineralization at Mina Capillitas, Catamarca". Revista de la Asociación Geológica Argentina. 64 (3): 514–524. S2CID 55017999.
- Clark, David A. (June 2014). "Magnetic effects of hydrothermal alteration in porphyry copper and iron-oxide copper–gold systems: A review". Tectonophysics. 624–625: 46–65. Bibcode:2014Tectp.624...46C. doi:10.1016/j.tecto.2013.12.011.
- Urbina, N. P.; Sruoga, P.; Malvicini, L. (6 July 2010). "Late Tertiary Gold-Bearing Volcanic Belt in the Sierras Pampeanas of San Luis, Argentina". International Geology Review. 39 (4): 287–306. doi:10.1080/00206819709465272.
- Bianchi, M.; Heit, B.; Jakovlev, A.; Yuan, X.; Kay, S.M.; Sandvol, E.; Alonso, R.N.; Coira, B.; Brown, L.; Kind, R.; Comte, D. (February 2013). "Teleseismic tomography of the southern Puna plateau in Argentina and adjacent regions". Tectonophysics. 586: 65–83. Bibcode:2013Tectp.586...65B. doi:10.1016/j.tecto.2012.11.016. hdl:11336/7332.
- Sillitoe, R. H.; Bonham, H. F. (1 October 1984). "Volcanic landforms and ore deposits". Economic Geology. 79 (6): 1286–1298. Bibcode:1984EcGeo..79.1286S. doi:10.2113/gsecongeo.79.6.1286.
- Landtwing, M. R.; Dillenbeck, E. D.; Leake, M. H.; Heinrich, C. A. (1 September 2002). "Evolution of the Breccia-Hosted Porphyry Cu-Mo-Au Deposit at Agua Rica, Argentina: Progressive Unroofing of a Magmatic Hydrothermal System". Economic Geology. 97 (6): 1273–1292. Bibcode:2002EcGeo..97.1273L. doi:10.2113/gsecongeo.97.6.1273.
- Sillitoe, R. H. (1 June 2008). "Special Paper: Major Gold Deposits and Belts of the North and South American Cordillera: Distribution, Tectonomagmatic Settings, and Metallogenic Considerations". Economic Geology. 103 (4): 663–687. Bibcode:2008EcGeo.103..663S. doi:10.2113/gsecongeo.103.4.663. S2CID 59584842.
- Hollings, P.; Cooke, D.; Clark, A. (29 March 2006). "Regional Geochemistry of Tertiary Igneous Rocks in Central Chile: Implications for the Geodynamic Environment of Giant Porphyry Copper and Epithermal Gold Mineralization". Economic Geology. 100 (5): 887–904. doi:10.2113/gsecongeo.100.5.887.
- http://www.e-sga.org/fileadmin/sga/newsletter/news28/SGANews28.pdf
- Borba, Maurício Liska; Chemale, Farid; Kawashita, Koji; Takehara, Lucy; Babinski, Marly; Bruckman, Matheus (June 2016). "The Bajo de la Alumbrera and Agua Rica Cu–Au (Mo) porphyry deposits of Argentina: Genetic constraints on ore formation and sources based on isotope signatures". Ore Geology Reviews. 75: 116–124. Bibcode:2016OGRv...75..116B. doi:10.1016/j.oregeorev.2015.12.010.
- Márquez-Zavalía, M. Florencia; Heinrich, Christoph A. (1 March 2016). "Fluid evolution in a volcanic-hosted epithermal carbonate–base metal–gold vein system: Alto de la Blenda, Farallón Negro, Argentina". Mineralium Deposita. 51 (7): 873–902. Bibcode:2016MinDe..51..873M. doi:10.1007/s00126-016-0639-y. hdl:20.500.11850/114041. S2CID 130156477.
- Ramos, Victor A.; Cristallini, E.O.; Pérez, Daniel J. (April 2002). "The Pampean flat-slab of the Central Andes". Journal of South American Earth Sciences. 15 (1): 59–78. Bibcode:2002JSAES..15...59R. doi:10.1016/S0895-9811(02)00006-8. hdl:11336/93813.
- Sasso, Anne M. (1997). Geological evolution and metallogenetic relationships of the Farallon Negro volcanic complex, NW Argentina (PDF) (Thesis).
- Harris, Anthony C; Kamenetsky, Vadim S; White, Noel C (2004). "The Magmatic-hydrothermal Transition: Volatile Separation in Silicic Rocks at Bajo de la Alumbrera Porphyry Cu-Au Deposit, NW Argentina" (PDF). The Ishihara Symposium: Granites and Associated Metallogenesis. S2CID 127642595.
- Roy, R.; Cassard, D.; Cobbold, P.R.; Rossello, E.A.; Billa, M.; Bailly, L.; Lips, A.L.W. (November 2006). "Predictive mapping for copper–gold magmatic-hydrothermal systems in NW Argentina: Use of a regional-scale GIS, application of an expert-guided data-driven approach, and comparison with results from a continental-scale GIS". Ore Geology Reviews. 29 (3–4): 260–286. Bibcode:2006OGRv...29..260R. doi:10.1016/j.oregeorev.2005.10.002. hdl:11336/16669.
- Ulrich, T.; Heinrich, C. A. (1 December 2002). "Geology and Alteration Geochemistry of the Porphyry Cu-Au Deposit at Bajo de la Alumbrera, Argentina". Economic Geology. 97 (8): 1865–1888. Bibcode:2002EcGeo..97.1865U. doi:10.2113/gsecongeo.97.8.1865.
- Mao, Jingwen; Bierlein, Frank P., eds. (2005). "Occurrence and paragenesis of tellurium in mineral deposits of Argentina". Mineral deposit research meeting the global challenge : proceedings of the Eighth Biennial SGA Meeting, Beijing, China, 18-21 August 2005. Berlin: Springer. pp. 1419–1422. doi:10.1007/3-540-27946-6_361. ISBN 978-3-540-27946-4.
- Chernicoff, Carlos J; Richards, Jeremy P; Zappettini, Eduardo O (December 2002). "Crustal lineament control on magmatism and mineralization in northwestern Argentina: geological, geophysical, and remote sensing evidence". Ore Geology Reviews. 21 (3–4): 127–155. Bibcode:2002OGRv...21..127C. doi:10.1016/S0169-1368(02)00087-2.
- Mao, Jingwen; Bierlein, Frank P., eds. (2005). "Timing of volatile and magma ascent in the formation of the Bajo de la Alumbrera porphyry Cu-Au deposit". Mineral deposit research meeting the global challenge : proceedings of the Eighth Biennial SGA Meeting, Beijing, China, 18-21 August 2005. Berlin: Springer. pp. 393–396. doi:10.1007/3-540-27946-6_103. ISBN 978-3-540-27946-4.
- Harris, Anthony C.; Kamenetsky, Vadim S.; White, Noel C.; Steele, David A. (September 2004). "Volatile Phase Separation in Silicic Magmas at Bajo de la Alumbrera Porphyry Cu-Au Deposit, NW Argentina" (PDF). Resource Geology. 54 (3): 341–356. doi:10.1111/j.1751-3928.2004.tb00210.x.
- Proffett, J. M. (1 December 2003). "Geology of the Bajo de la Alumbrera Porphyry Copper-Gold Deposit, Argentina". Economic Geology. 98 (8): 1535–1574. Bibcode:2003EcGeo..98.1535P. doi:10.2113/gsecongeo.98.8.1535.
- Franchini, Marta; Impiccini, Agnes; Lentz, David; Ríos, Francisco Javier; O'Leary, Sol; Pons, Josefina; Schalamuk, Abel Isidoro (October 2011). "Porphyry to epithermal transition in the Agua Rica polymetallic deposit, Catamarca, Argentina: An integrated petrologic analysis of ore and alteration parageneses". Ore Geology Reviews. 41 (1): 49–74. Bibcode:2011OGRv...41...49F. doi:10.1016/j.oregeorev.2011.06.010.
- Acocella, V.; Gioncada, A.; Omarini, R.; Riller, U.; Mazzuoli, R.; Vezzoli, L. (June 2011). "Tectonomagmatic characteristics of the back-arc portion of the Calama-Olacapato-El Toro Fault Zone, Central Andes". Tectonics. 30 (3): n/a. Bibcode:2011Tecto..30.3005A. doi:10.1029/2010TC002854. hdl:11336/13093. S2CID 129273472.
- Martínez, Facundo; Fogliata, Ana; Montenegro, Nicolás; Hagemann, Steffen (December 2014). "Metalogénesis de la veta Farallón Negro rama norte, Farallón Negro, provincia de Catamarca" [Metallogenesis of the Farallón Negro vein, northern branch, Farallón Negro, Catamarca province]. Revista de la Asociación Geológica Argentina (in Spanish). 71 (4): 553–561.
