= Leon Muerto =

Volcano in Chile

Coordinates: 25°57′S 68°28′W

Leon Muerto is a 4,799 metres (15,745 ft) high volcano in Chile.

The Central Chilean Andes have an arid climate since the Miocene. Thus, a number of volcanic centres going back as far as 25 million years are well preserved. Geologically, this area belongs to the Central Volcanic Zone, a volcanic belt in the Andes, whose magmas are heavily influenced by the thick crust of the area.

Leon Muerto is a deeply eroded volcano with a radial symmetric structure on the border between Argentina and Chile. It covers a surface of 80 square kilometres (31 sq mi). It was formed between 25 and 17 million years ago and has a volume of 19 cubic kilometres (4.6 cu mi). The crust beneath Leon Muerto has an average thickness of 60 kilometres (37 mi). Better dates obtained on Leon Muerto by potassium-argon dating indicate an age of 19,900,000 ± 800,000 years ago. It is among the oldest centres in the area and parts of its subvolcanic structure are exposed.

Erosion has exposed much of the structure of Leon Muerto. It includes lava flows 2–3 kilometres (1.2–1.9 mi) long, lapilli and tephra. Most of the rocks are basaltic andesite, dacite is also present in the central parts of the volcano and aluminum-rich basalt has also been found. Some lava flows contain olivine. The magmas that formed the volcano are partially evolved magmas, with their formation influenced by the crust. These lavas are considered to be backarc lavas and resemble these of volcanoes farther south.

A number of ignimbrites are found in the territory, one of them named Leon Muerto is found southwest of the volcano. This ignimbrite is 5 million years old.
