= Cerro Ratones =

Stratovolcano in Argentina

Coordinates: 25°14′33″S 66°52′47″W

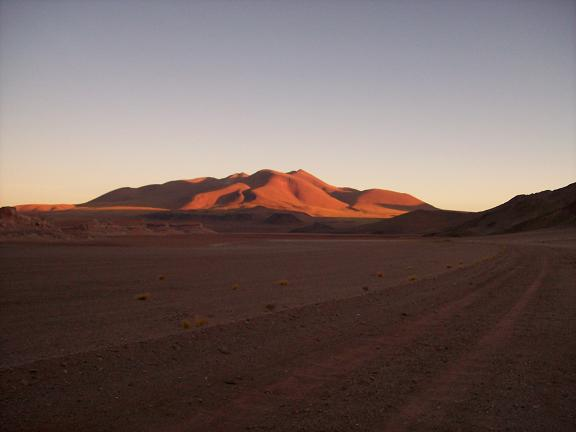

Cerro Ratones is a partly eroded andesitic stratovolcano in Argentina, in the eastern edge of the Puna. The Diablillos-Galán fault zone intersects a volcanic lineament named Archibarca-Ratones beneath the volcano.

The age of the volcano is equivocal; Oligocene ages of 30±3 mya are found but one biotite was dated by Argon-argon dating to be about 7 mya old. Both dates come from lava flows; the older date would make this volcano one of the oldest in the area. Toconquis group ignimbrites crop out next to the Ratones edifice.

The Ojo de Ratones system is located northeast of Cerro Ratones and the Galan giant caldera 70 kilometres (43 mi) in the south.
