= Puesto Cortaderas =

Mountain in Argentina

- Location within Argentina

Highest point
- Elevation: 970 m (3,180 ft)
- Coordinates: 37°33′S 69°37′W

Geography
- Location: Neuquén Province, Argentina
- Parent range: Andean Volcanic Belt

Geology
- Mountain type: Volcanic pyroclastic cone
- Last eruption: Unknown

Puesto Cortaderas is an isolated basaltic pyroclastic cone in Neuquén Province, Argentina.

It is in the Andean Volcanic Belt.

== See also ==
- List of volcanoes in Argentina
