= Sugarloaf (disambiguation) =

A sugarloaf is refined sugar in the form of a rounded cone, the most common way of distributing sugar until the late 19th century.

Sugarloaf or Sugar Loaf may also refer to:

== Geographic features ==
- Sugarloaf Mountain, the famous landmark in Rio de Janeiro, Brazil
- Sugarloaf (mountain), a list of other mountains with the same name
- Sugar Loaf (Winona, Minnesota), a bluff on the Mississippi River in Winona, Minnesota
- Sugar Loaf Island (California), the westernmost island in California in Humboldt County
- Sugarloaf Island, California, one of the Farallon Islands offshore of San Francisco, California
- Sugarloaf Rock (Curtis Group), in Bass Strait off the north-east coast of Tasmania
- Sugarloaf Rock (Mutton Bird Group), off the south-west coast of Tasmania
- Sugarloaf Rock, Western Australia, near Cape Naturaliste Lighthouse, Western Australia
- Sugar Loaf Rocks, New Zealand

== Communities ==
- Sugarloaf, Kansas, USA
- Sugarloaf, California, USA
- Sugarloaf, Colorado, USA
- Sugar Loaf, New York, USA
- Sugar Loaf, a community in Port Colborne, Ontario, Canada
- Sugarloaf Township (disambiguation), several townships in the USA
- Sugarloaf Key, Florida, USA

== Other uses ==
- Sugarloaf Parkway, Gwinnett County, Georgia, USA
- Sugarloaf (ski resort), Maine, USA
- Sugar Loaf Dam, near Leadville, Colorado
- Sugar Loaf point, marina and harbour, Port Colborne, Ontario
- Sugar Loaf railway station, Wales
- Te Heru o Kahukura / Sugarloaf, New Zealand
- Sugarloaf Reservoir, located north-east of Melbourne, Victoria, Australia
- Sugarloaf (band), an American rock band
  - Sugarloaf (album), the band's debut album
- Sugarloaf chicory, a cultivated type of chicory
- Sugarloaf helm, a type of great helm

== See also ==
- Sugarloaf Ridge State Park, California
- Sugarloaf Mountain Park, California, USA
- Sugarloaf Saw Mill, California, USA
- Sugarloaf Village, California, USA
- Pan de Azúcar (disambiguation) (Spanish equivalent)
- Sakharnaya Golova Island "Sugarloaf Island" in the Sea of Okhotsk
