= Los Gemelos-El Saladillo =

Monogenetic volcanoes in Argentina

Los Gemelos-El Saladillo are monogenetic volcanoes in Argentina.

== Geologic context ==
The Nazca Plate subducts beneath the South America Plate, giving rise to the volcanism in the Andean Central Volcanic Zone, including mafic back-arc volcanism which is often associated with tectonic lineaments.

Los Gemelos (24°45′S 66°10′W) and El Saladillo (24°33′23″S 66°12′10″W) lie in the Calchaqui Valley, close to the towns of La Poma and El Saladillo. The valley is bordered by two thrust faults, at least one (the Calchaqui fault) of which has had historical earthquakes; the Los Gemelos volcanic cones were constructed along the fault.

== Geology ==
Los Gemelos consists of three individual vents, the northern two have generated scoria cones the southern features a fissure. The vents have produced about 0.45 cubic kilometres (0.11 cu mi) of lava, three from the northern and two from the central vent; lava flows reach the bed of the Calchaqui River and have flowed along its bed, damming the river and forming a lake. El Saladillo consists of two partially eroded cones which have generated lava flows and several smaller cones generated by explosive eruptions.

The two volcanoes have erupted shoshonitic rocks, consisting of trachybasalt andesite. They contain phenocrysts of clinopyroxene, mica, olivine and plagioclase but also xenoliths.

=== Eruption history ===
The volcanoes were constructed during the Pleistocene. The activity at Los Gemelos appears to be associated with an episode of tectonic activity, and on the basis of sediments in the lava-dammed lake the eruption occurred about 35,000 years ago.

== Bibliography ==
- Von Wolff, F (1929). Der Volcanismus II Band: Spezieller Teil 1 Teil Die Neue Welt (Pazifische Erdhalfte) der Pazifische Ozean und Seine Randgebiete (in German). Stuttgart: Ferdinand Enke. p. 354. "El Volcan" may refer to this volcano.
