= Caldera del Atuel =

Mountain in Argentina

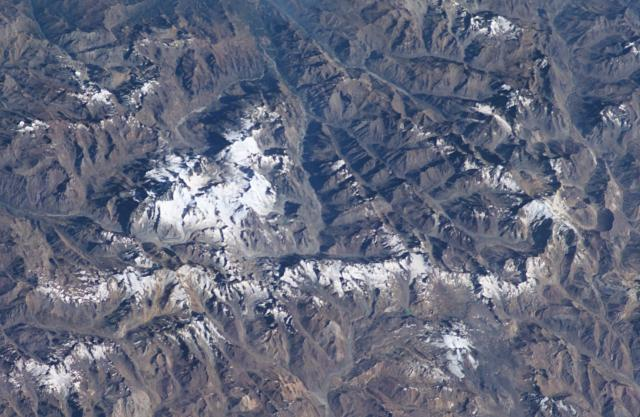
- A complex of snow-covered cones (left-center) partially fills the 30 x 45 km wide Caldera del Atuel, which lies just east of the Argentina-Chile border. The headwaters of the Río del Atuel drain to the SE through a wide breach in the caldera rim (top center) in this NASA International Space Station image (with north to the bottom left). The snow-covered Volcán Overo and Sosneado complexes in the eastern part of the caldera contain numerous very youthful basaltic-to-andesitic pyroclastic cones and lava flows.

Highest point
- Elevation: 5,189 m (17,024 ft)
- Coordinates: 34°39′S 70°03′W

Geography
- Location: Mendoza Province, Argentina
- Parent range: Andes

Geology
- Mountain type: Caldera
- Last eruption: Unknown

Caldera del Atuel is a caldera in Argentina. It is the source of the Rio Atuel and has dimensions of 30 by 45 kilometres (19 mi × 28 mi). Cerro Sosneado is a volcano (best volume estimate 244.2 cubic kilometres (58.6 cu mi)) located outside of the Atuel caldera, Volcan Overo (best volume estimate 89 cubic kilometres (21 cu mi)) and Las Lágrimas complex are located within the caldera. Holocene activity may have formed the cinder cones on the northeastern side of the caldera. After the 2010 Maule earthquake, the caldera was one of the volcanic centres that underwent subsidence, along with secondary earthquake activity.

== See also ==
- List of volcanoes in Argentina
