= Tromen =

Mountain in Argentina

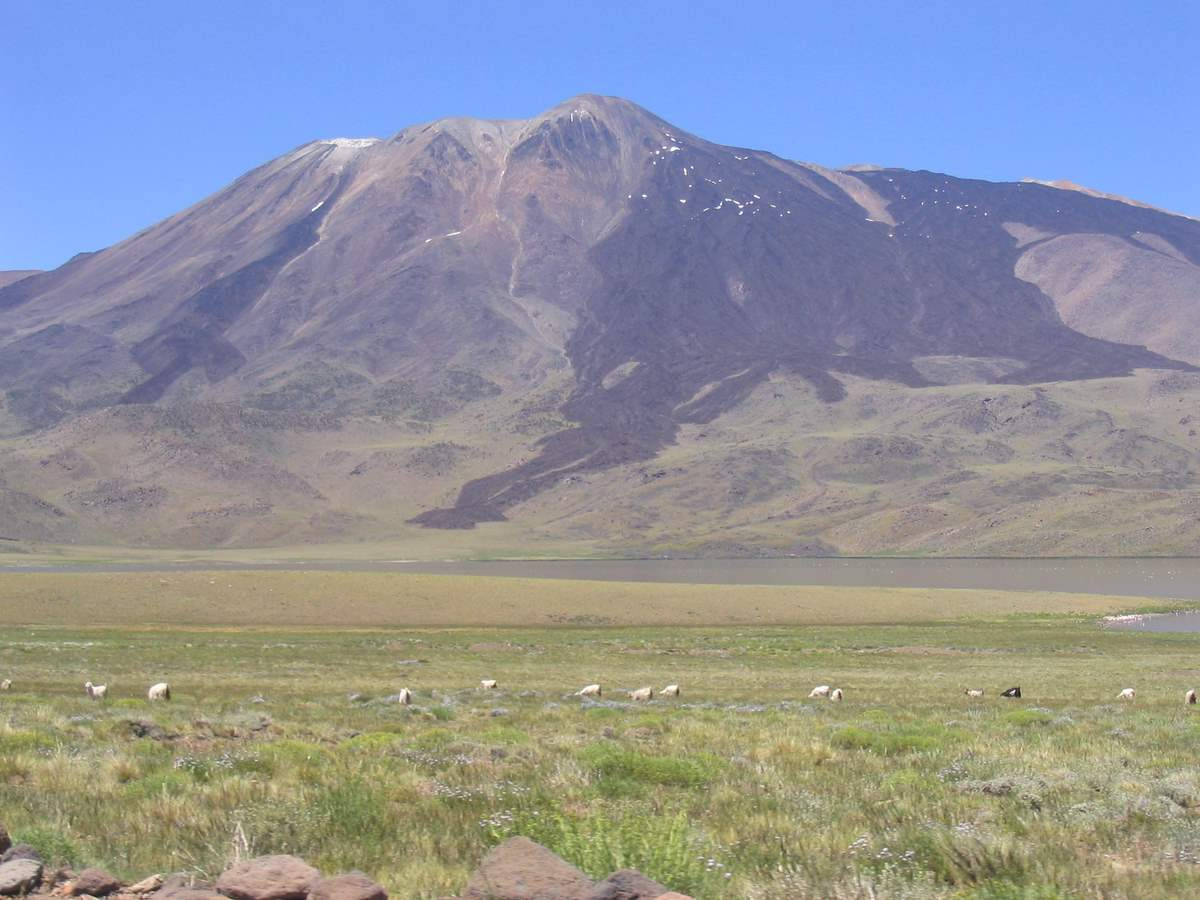

Highest point
- Elevation: 3,985 m (13,074 ft)
- Prominence: 1,726 m
- Coordinates: 37.1400°S 70.0494°W

Geography
- Location within Argentina
- Location: Argentina
- Parent range: Andes

Geology
- Rock age: Holocene
- Mountain type: Stratovolcano
- Last eruption: 1822

Tromen is a stratovolcano in western Argentina. It rises above the older caldera of the Volcán Negro del Tromen.

== See also ==
- List of volcanoes in Argentina
