= Maipo (volcano) =

Mountain in Argentina

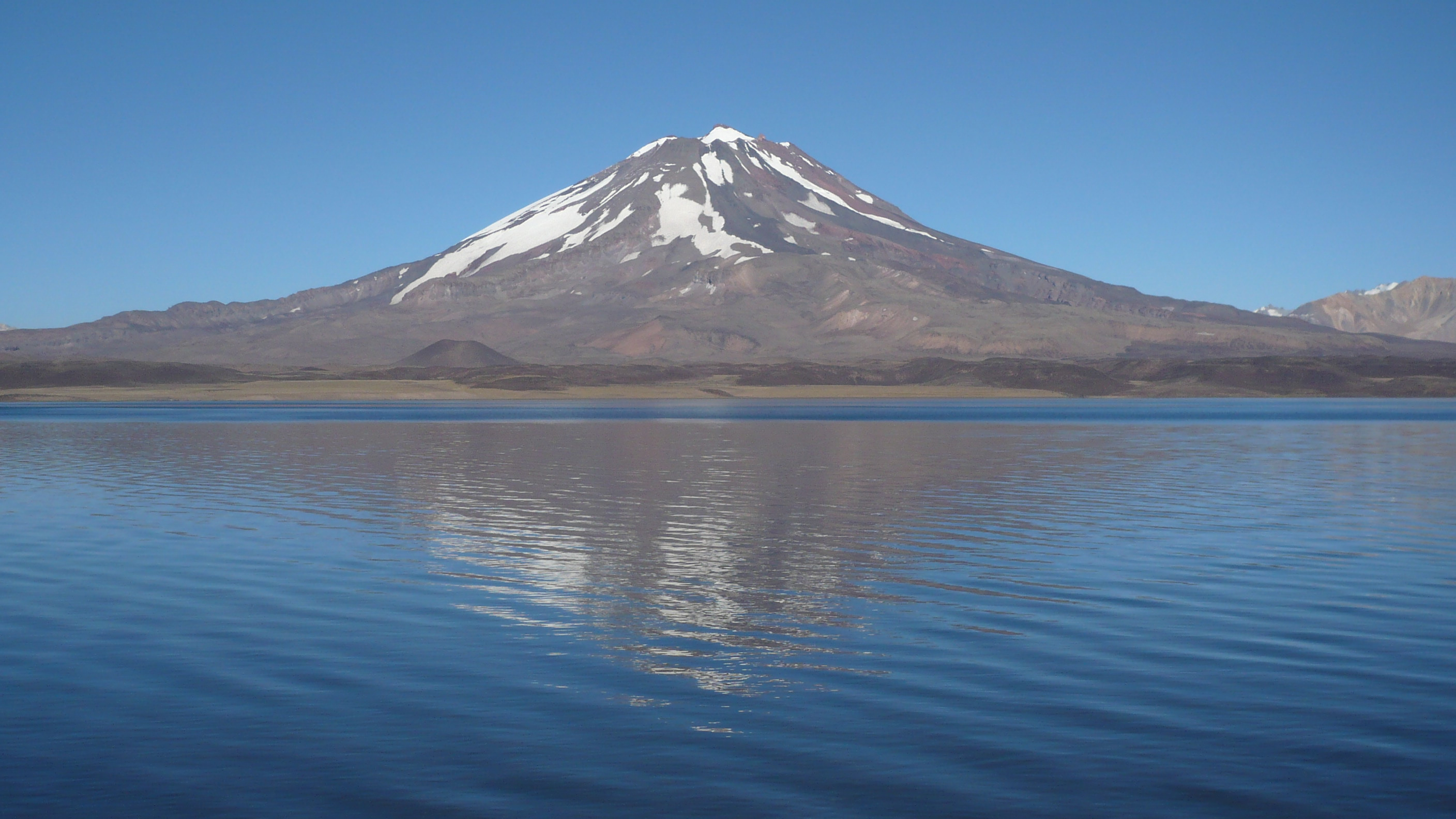
- Maipo volcano in 2008

Highest point
- Elevation: 5,264 m (17,270 ft) (Note: from Shuttle Radar Topography Mission (SRTM) data.)
- Prominence: 1,535 m (5,036 ft)
- Coordinates: 34°09′39.6″S 69°49′58.8″W

Geography
- Location within Argentina
- Location: Argentina – Chile
- Parent range: Principal Cordillera, Andes

Geology
- Mountain type: Stratovolcano
- Last eruption: 1912

Climbing
- First ascent: 1883 by Paul Güssfeldt
- Easiest route: snow/ice climb

Maipo is a stratovolcano in the Andes, lying on the border between Argentina and Chile. It is located 90 km (56 mi) south of Tupungato and about 100 km (62 mi) southeast of Santiago. It has a symmetrical, conical volcanic shape, and is among the southernmost 5,000 metre peaks in the Andes.

Maipo is located within the Diamante caldera, a feature measuring 15 km by 20 km that is about half a million years old. It rises about 1,900 m (6,230 ft) above the floor of the caldera. Immediately to the east of the peak, on the eastern side of the caldera floor, is Laguna del Diamante, a lake that formed when lava flows blocked drainage channels from the caldera in 1826. The Diamante Caldera erupted 450 cubic kilometers (108 cu mi) of tephra, 450 ka.

The region's climate is transitional between the drier Mediterranean climate of the peaks to the north and the cold, moist climate of Chilean Patagonia. Hence, while less glaciated than Patagonia, it has more permanent snow on the wet, Chilean side than peaks of similar elevation to the north.

== See also ==
- List of volcanoes in Chile
- List of volcanoes in Argentina
- Maip
