= Los Nacimientos, Antofagasta de la Sierra =

Coordinates: 25°49′25″S 67°22′17″W

Los Nacimientos
- Municipality and village
- Interactive map of Los Nacimientos
- Country: Argentina
- Province: Catamarca Province
- Time zone: UTC−3 (ART)

Los Nacimientos is a village and municipality in Catamarca Province in northwestern Argentina.
