= Casa Colorada (volcano) =

Coordinates: 22°19′S 66°20′W

Casa Colorada is a dacitic volcanic dome complex erupted 17 million years ago. It has a volume of 1.5 cubic kilometres (0.36 cu mi). The complex formed in three stages, involving a tuff ring, lava domes and dacitic lava flows. It is constructed on red beds and a basement of Ordovician age. The main dome is dated 17.3 mya by potassium–argon dating. The main minerals are biotite, hornblende, feldspar and quartz; oxide minerals are also present.

== See also ==
- Altiplano–Puna volcanic complex
