= Sugarloaf Township =

Sugarloaf Township is the name of several places in the United States:

- Sugarloaf Township, Marion County, Arkansas
- Sugarloaf Township, Sebastian County, Arkansas
- Sugarloaf Township, St. Clair County, Illinois
- Sugarloaf Township, Columbia County, Pennsylvania
- Sugarloaf Township, Luzerne County, Pennsylvania

== See also ==
- Sugarloaf (disambiguation)
