= Las Lozas Volcanics =

Geological formation

- Stratigraphic range: Late Carboniferous; ~320 Ma
- Type: Geological formation
- Underlies: Paleozoic sediments
- Overlies: Metamorphic basement
- Thickness: up to 550 metres (1,800 ft)

Lithology
- Primary: Rhyolite

Location
- Region: Catamarca Province
- Country: Argentina

Type section
- Named for: Las Lozas Valley

The Las Lozas Volcanics is a Late Carboniferous geological formation in the Las Lozas Valley in the Catamarca Province of northwestern Argentina.

== Description ==
During the Ordovician, the Famatinian orogeny on Gondwana's western margin laid down large volcanic deposits. Some of these were later found to be younger, of Carboniferous-Pennsylvanian age. In the Las Lozas valley, this younger unit is 550 metres (1,800 ft) thick and dominated by rhyolite. It lies beneath Paleozoic sediments and above a metamorphic basement. This volcanic activity occurred concurrently with crustal extension, which may be associated either with the Famatinian orogeny, the Achalian orogeny or a separate event.

The Las Lozas unit has been dated at 320 million years, with previous dates for other units being between 336 and 298 million years. The rocks erupted during this volcanic episode were formed from much older crust of Cryogenian age, based on isotope dating of zircons. This older crust may have formed when Rodinia broke up.

The structure of the deposits indicates that explosive eruptions involving lava domes were the principal sources of the Las Lozas volcanic deposits. Also present basalts formed lava flows, which may have originated from the lava domes as well. The activity occurred at high temperatures and was issued by fissure vents.
