= Aguiliri =

Aguiliri is a lava dome complex in the Andes. It lies near Jama at the Chile-Argentina border in the Jujuy Province. It is part of the Argentine Puna and the Jama stratovolcano lies 4 kilometres (2.5 mi) west.

== Geology ==
The complex is constructed in the sides of a tectonic horst and includes andesitic structures (Cerro Chingolo) and porphyric dacitic ones like Aguiliri. The centre consists of three dacitic lava domes and a dacitic stock intruded in Tertiary sediments and basement. The complex's composition is dacitic and biotites in the complex are K-Ar dated 12.7 mya ago, of Middle Miocene age. The complex was originally a cryptodome complex that was exposed by erosion.

Plagioclase phenocrysts are contained in the dacite, as well as more derived allanite, biotite, plagioclase, quartz and other minerals. Inclusions of apatite, monazite and zircon are also contained in allanite. Uranium minerals are found associated with iron and manganese oxide, marcasite and pyrite.

The local geology consists of Ordovician marine sediments with local pre-Ordovician outcrops. During the Oligocene-Miocene, the Pehuenche orogeny caused widespread sedimentation in the region, forming the Log Log Formation. Large scale andesitic, dacitic and rhyolitic activity commenced during the Miocene Quechua orogeny, forming the Aguiliri centre.

== Uranium deposits ==
The uranium mineral autunite is found in the country rock surrounding the dome. This mineral was probably formed by volatile activity acting on the dacites. Meta-autunite, meta-orbernite and sabugalite are also found. The complex was drilled 225 metres (738 ft).
