= Antilla magmatic complex =

Coordinates: 26°10′S 64°40′W

Antilla magmatic complex is a volcano in the Salta Province of Argentina, close to a village of the same name.

Since the Jurassic, subduction off the western margin of South America has been responsible for volcanism in the Andes, including typical volcanic arc activity in the Western Cordillera and back-arc activity in the Altiplano which has the Antilla system. This back-arc activity is associated with large transversal faults and appears to be linked to crustal delamination processes.

The Antilla magmatic complex is relatively small, covering a surface area of 150 square kilometres (58 sq mi). It consists of a group of monogenetic vents that surround the Cerro Negro mountain. North of the mountain two dykes have been found, while lava flows with thicknesses of 3–20 metres (9.8–65.6 ft) are found embedded within sediments on its southern side.

Antilla rocks are compositionally trachybasalts to trachytes. They are porphyritic and contain phenocrysts of amphibole and clinopyroxene. The matrix in addition contains biotite, feldspar, olivine, plagioclase, titanium oxides and iron oxides. Substantial alteration has yielded albite, calcite, epidote, phyllosilicates, sericite and zeolites.

Two different ages have been obtained on Antilla rocks, the first one 4.67 - 4.83 million years ago and the second 7.7 million years ago. The first was obtained by potassium-argon dating while the second originates from argon-argon dating; it is not clear why they are different. Antilla is the easternmost volcanic centre in the area; further east, both a compressional tectonic regime and the Brazilian Craton prevent magmas from reaching the surface.
