= Minuyoc =

Coordinates: 22°32′S 66°14′W

Minuyoc is a lava dome complex in the Andes.

The Altiplano-Puna has been affected by volcanic activity for a long time, with the oldest volcanism occurring during the Ordovician. At least four different phases of volcanic activity occurred during the Cenozoic, each of them preceded by episodes of crustal deformation.

The Minuyoc dome complex has a volume of 0.15 cubic kilometres (0.036 cu mi) and formed at an intersection of faults. Breccias, tuffs and dacite lavas were formed during its eruption sequence. The age of the dome is unknown. Minerals in its rocks include amphibole, biotite, orthopyroxene and plagioclase.
