= El Peñón, Catamarca =

Coordinates: 26°28′41″S 67°15′54″W

El Peñón (Catamarca)
- Municipality and village
- Interactive map of El Peñón (Catamarca)
- Country: Argentina
- Province: Catamarca Province
- Time zone: UTC−3 (ART)

El Peñón (Catamarca) is a village and municipality in Catamarca Province in northwestern Argentina.
