= Pan de Azúcar (dome) =

Mountain in Chile

Coordinates: 22°36′S 66°03′W

Pan de Azúcar is a lava dome group in Argentina.

This group lies in the Laguna de Pozuelos region and includes lava flows and pyroclastic flows which were erupted in three stages in the middle Miocene under the influence of faults in the region. A mine is close to the centre and was active until the 1990s.
