= Los Nacimientos, Belén =

Coordinates: 27°11′S 66°44′W

Los Nacimientos (Belén)
- Municipality and village
- Interactive map of Los Nacimientos (Belén)
- Country: Argentina
- Province: Catamarca Province
- Department: Belén
- Time zone: UTC−3 (ART)

Los Nacimientos is a village and municipality in Catamarca Province in northwestern Argentina.
