= Pocho volcanic field =

Volcanic field in Argentina

Coordinates: 31°50′S 65°20′W

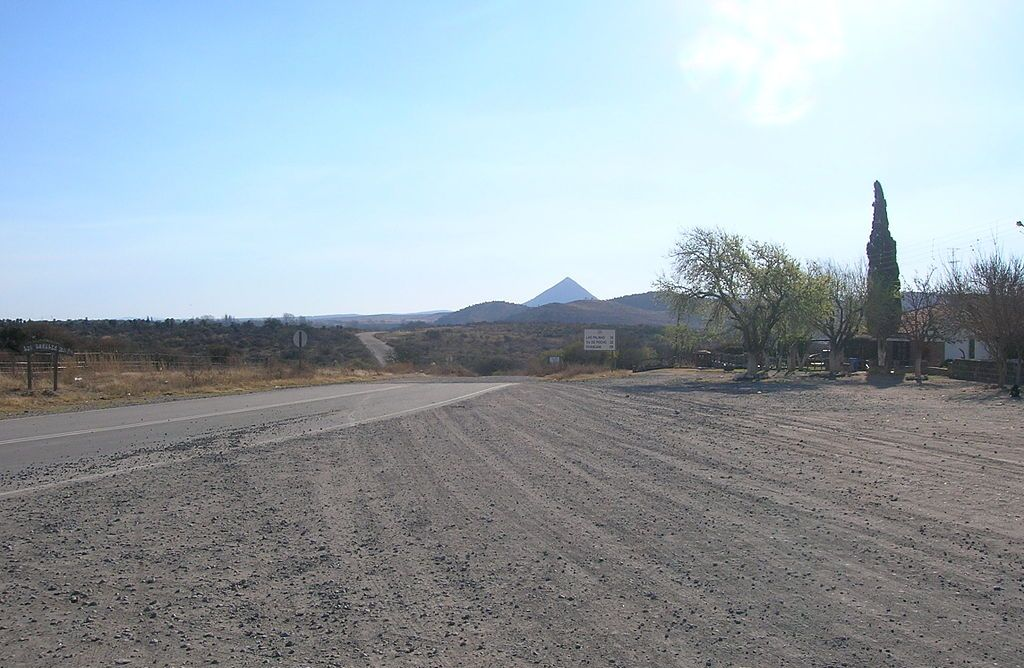
View of Pocho volcano from the town of Taninga.

Pocho volcanic field is a volcanic field in Argentina. It is associated with a crustal lineament known as the Ojo de Agua Lineament.

It is located in the Sierras de Cordoba mountain chain. It formed during the late Miocene, when a progressive shallowing of the subducting Nazca Plate caused volcanic activity to retreat 500 kilometres (310 mi) from the main Andes into the land behind the mountain chain. This did result in a typical shallow slab chemistry of the Pocho rocks. Volcanic activity at Pocho is dated about 4.7 +- 0.3 million years ago and took place over two cycles. Seismic activity in the area may indicate the presence of a residual magma chamber however, which would also explain anomalous crustal seismic velocities in the area.
