= Block and ash flow =

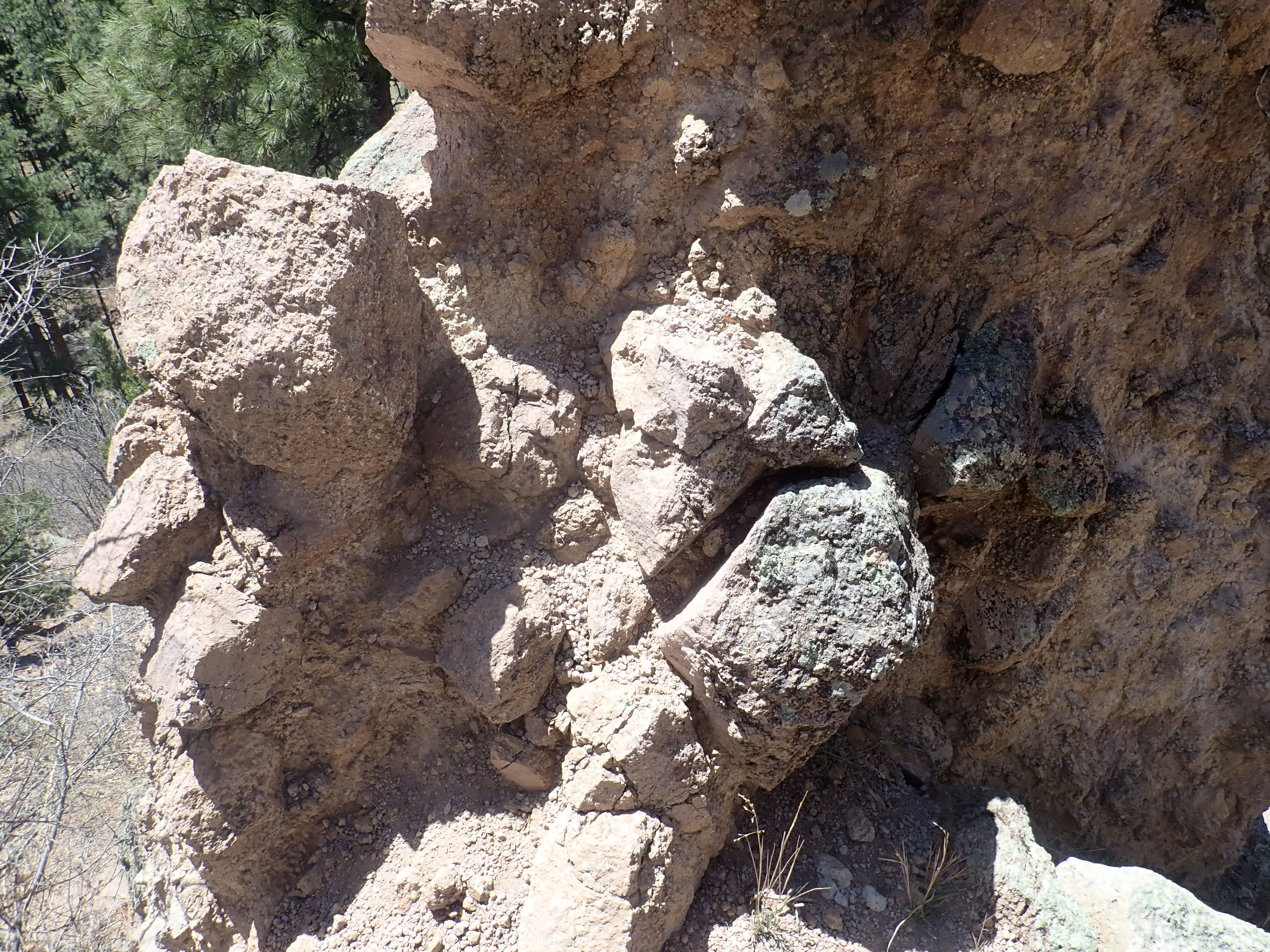
Outcrop of a block and ash flow in the Tschicoma Formation, New Mexico, US

A block and ash flow or block-and-ash flow is a flowing mixture of volcanic ash and large (>26 cm) angular blocks commonly formed as a result of a gravitational collapse of a lava dome or lava flow. Block and ash flows are a type of pyroclastic flow and as such they form during volcanic eruptions. In contrast to other types of pyroclastic flows, block and ash flows do not contain pumice and the volume of block and ash flow deposits is usually small. Block and ash flow deposits have densities in the range of 1600 to 2000 kg/m^{3}, two to five times greater than ash fall deposits. Some blocks in block and ash flow deposits may have thin and shiny coatings of carbon derived from charcoal formed from vegetation trapped by the flow.

Volcanoes known for their production of block and ash flows since the 1990s include Mount Unzen in Japan, Mount Merapi in Java and Soufrière Hills in the Lesser Antilles.
