= Galán =

Mountain in Argentina

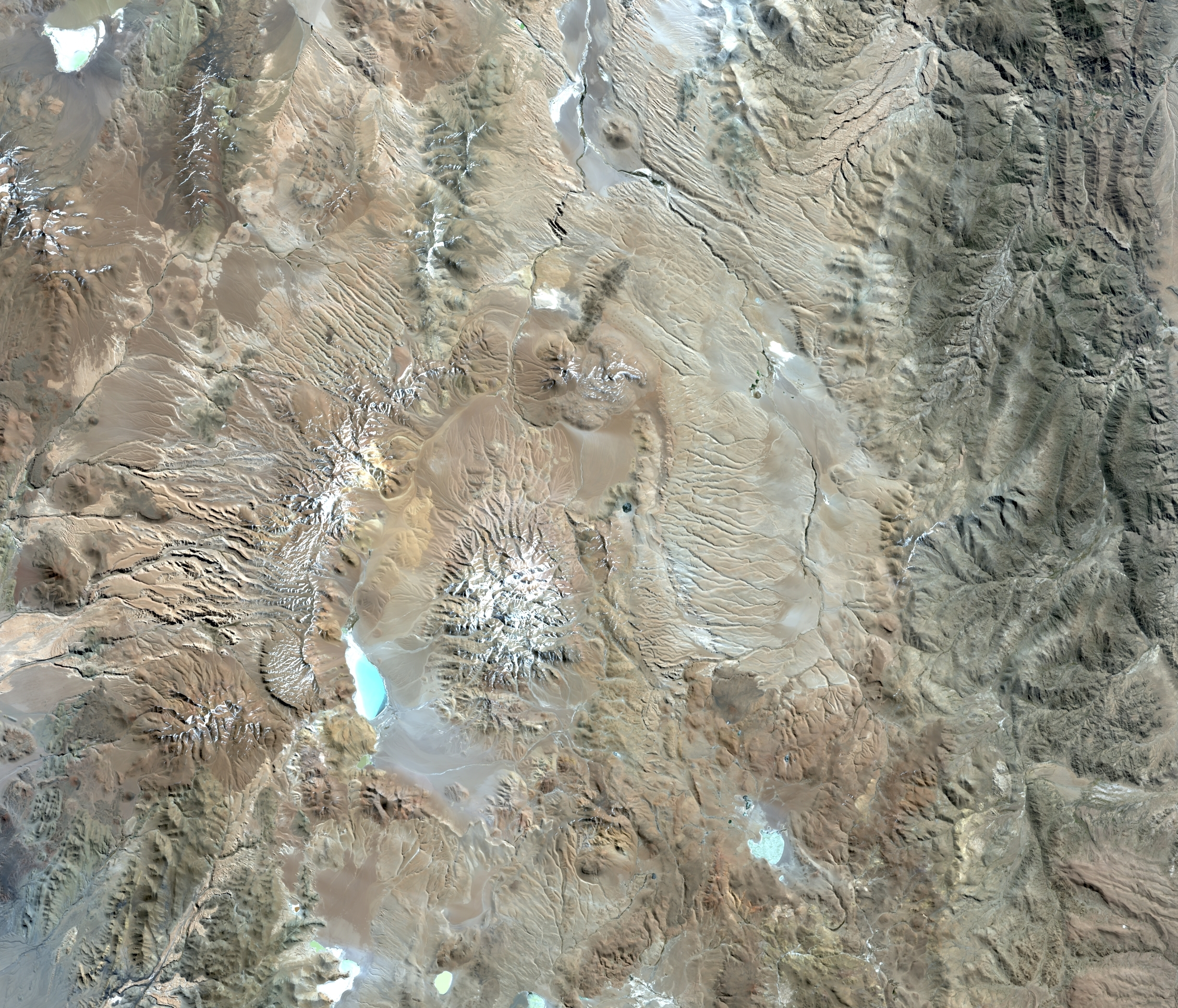
- Galán viewed from space

Highest point
- Elevation: 6,100 m (20,000 ft)
- Coordinates: 25°56′S 66°55′W

Geography
- Location within Argentina
- Location: Catamarca Province, Argentina
- Parent range: Andes

Geology
- Rock age: 2.08 ± 0.02 million years
- Mountain type: Caldera
- Last eruption: Unknown

Cerro Galán is a caldera in the Catamarca Province of Argentina. It is one of the largest exposed calderas in the world and forms part of the Central Volcanic Zone of the Andes, one of the three volcanic belts found in South America. One of several major caldera systems in the Central Volcanic Zone, the mountain is grouped into the Altiplano–Puna volcanic complex.

Volcanic activity at Galán is the indirect consequence of the subduction of the Nazca Plate beneath the South America Plate, and involves the infiltration of melts into the crust and the formation of secondary magmas which after storage in the crust give rise to the dacitic to rhyodacitic rocks erupted by the volcano.

Galán was active between 5.6 and 4.51 million years ago, when it generated a number of ignimbrites known as the Toconquis group which crop out mainly west of the caldera. The largest eruption of Galán was 2.08 ± 0.02 million years ago and was the source of the Galán ignimbrite, which covered the surroundings of the caldera with volcanic material. The volume of this ignimbrite has been estimated to be about 650 cubic kilometres (160 cu mi); after this eruption much smaller ignimbrite eruptions took place and presently two hot springs are active in the caldera.

== Geography and geomorphology ==
The Galán caldera lies in the northwestern Catamarca Province of Argentina and was discovered in 1975 in a remote region of the Andes, using satellite images. The town of Antofagasta de la Sierra lies west-southwest of the Galán caldera, Tacuil is almost due northeast from the caldera and El Penon southwest of the volcano. The caldera is difficult to access. An Inka tambo was situated at Laguna Diamante, and an important prehistoric travel route passed through the caldera. Sacrificial offers were given on the summit of Galán.

Galán is part of the Central Volcanic Zone of the Andes, which lies on the western margin of South America, where the Nazca Plate subducts beneath the South America Plate. There are about 50 volcanoes with recent activity in the Central Volcanic Zone, and additional volcanoes exist in the Northern Volcanic Zone and the Southern Volcanic Zone, two other volcanic belts north and south.

The volcanic arc runs along the borders between Bolivia and Argentina with Chile, and behind the volcanic arc lies a chain of silicic (Note: Silicic volcanic rocks are volcanic rocks such as dacite and rhyolite that contain at least 63% silicon dioxide. Volcanoes erupting such rocks tend to undergo explosive eruptions.) volcanoes, of which Galán is a southern member. The whole region has been subject to substantial ignimbrite-forming volcanism with many eruptions producing volumes of rock larger than 100 cubic kilometres (24 cu mi), although the actual vents often are only visible from space imagery. Many vents cluster in an area known as the Altiplano-Puna volcanic complex which occupies a surface of about 70,000 square kilometres (27,000 sq mi) approximately 200 kilometres (120 mi) north of Galán, and which includes the large calderas of La Pacana, Cerro Guacha, Pastos Grandes and Cerro Panizos as well as more recent geothermal systems. This volcanism appears to be a surface expression of a pluton, and at depths of 17–19 kilometres (11–12 mi) beneath the Altiplano-Puna volcanic complex electrical, gravity and seismic tomography data have localized a structure of partially molten rock called the "Altiplano Puna Magma Body". (Note: The "Altiplano Puna Magma Body" is a layer underneath the Altiplano that consists of large amounts of molten magma, with a volume of about 10,000 cubic kilometres (2,400 cu mi).) Volcanism in this "back" region may not be directly related to subduction processes despite the region itself being close to a subducting margin.

The Galán caldera lies on the eastern margin of the Andes, where the Sierras Pampeanas begin. The region is characterized by the Puna, a high plateau similar to Tibet in Asia. A magmatic body has been found under Galán, inside the crust.

=== Local ===
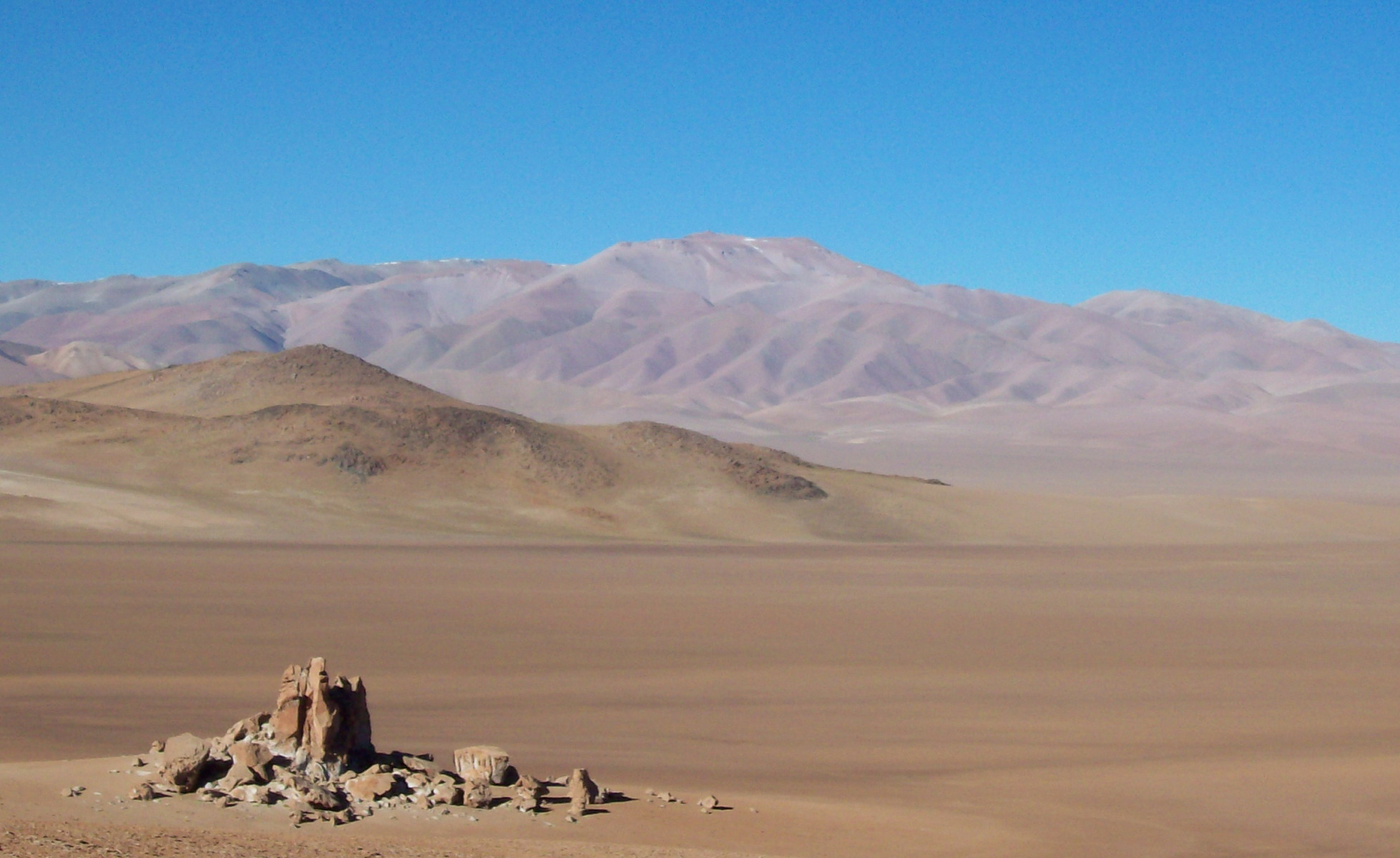
The Galán caldera from the inside

Galán is a caldera with topographic dimensions of 38 by 26 kilometres (24 mi × 16 mi), of which about 26 by 18 kilometres (16 mi × 11 mi) are part of the caldera proper. Such dimensions make Galán one of the biggest calderas on Earth; it has been described as a supervolcano. The floor of the caldera reaches an elevation of 4,500 metres (14,800 ft) or about 4,600 metres (15,100 ft), and the whole caldera has an elliptical shape extending in the north–south direction. Only the western margin of the caldera structure appears to be a true caldera margin, however, with different landforms forming the rest of the caldera walls and the actual collapse caldera covering only a portion of the topographic caldera expression; the latter has been defined to be a volcano-tectonic depression.

The caldera contains a resurgent dome, whose highest point in the frost-shattered Galán massif reaches an elevation of about 5,912 metres (19,396 ft)-6,100 metres (20,000 ft). Seismic tomography has identified a slow-speed anomaly beneath Galán, which has a volume of about 22,000 cubic kilometres (5,300 cu mi) and is considered to be a magma reservoir of the volcano.

Summits along the caldera margin include Cerro Aguas Calientes (a lava dome) to the north, Cerro Leon Muerto to the southeast, Cerro Pabellon to the southwest and Cerro Toconquis to the northwest. On the western rim, elevations of 5,200 metres (17,100 ft) are reached. Younger volcanoes have developed on the western and northern rim of the Galán caldera.

=== Hydrology and hydrothermal system ===
The caldera contains a 7 by 3 kilometres (4.3 mi × 1.9 mi) lake in its southwestern corner, which is known as Laguna Diamante and may formerly have occupied much of the caldera. Laguna Diamante has gained attention among scientists for the extreme environmental conditions that life within the lake has to withstand, including high arsenic contents of the waters and high insolation with ultraviolet radiation. The water is hyper-alkaline and five times as salty as the sea but supports microorganisms which form microbial mats and provide food for a colony of flamingos. Tube-shaped microbialites have also been reported. A smaller lake known as Laguna Pabellon lies just south of Laguna Diamante. North of the resurgent dome, the Rio Aguas Calientes drains the caldera northward, while east of it the Rio Leon Muerto runs eastward out of the caldera. Another Leon Muerto river drains the southern side of the caldera into Laguna Pabellon.

Rivers in the caldera and neighbourhood display river terraces which may reflect pre-caldera formation uplift of the terrain and uplift associated with the resurgent dome. These drainages eventually converge in the Rio de Los Patos and end into the Salar del Hombre Muerto north of Galán. The high Cerro Galán intercepts moisture transported from east, thus nourishing the Rio de Los Patos in a region where long permanent watercourses are unusual. The western flanks of the caldera drain into the Antofagasta de la Sierra valley through a number of drainages such as Rio Punilla, Rio Toconquis, Rio Miriguaca, Rio Las Pitas; the waters eventually end into the Laguna Antofagasta south of Antofagasta de la Sierra.

Two hot springs are found within the caldera, the first close to its northern end and the second on the southwestern foot of the resurgent dome, both emitting water with temperatures of about 56–85 °C (133–185 °F). The first one is known as the Aguas Calientes hydrothermal spring and features deposits of tufa and boiling water. Another geothermal system is known as La Colcha and includes fumaroles as well as boiling water; it drains into Laguna Diamante. Finally, on the northeastern side of the caldera is Piscinas Burbujeantes, with mud volcanoes and small fumaroles. These springs have emplaced clay, salt, sinter and travertine deposits and have been prospected for geothermal power development.

== Geology ==
The basement beneath the caldera consists of 600–365 million years old metamorphic and sedimentary rocks of Precambrian to Paleozoic age. These include intrusions of granitoid character and are overlain with Paleozoic marine sediments. Ordovician units are also present and form sediment layers up to 7 kilometres (4.3 mi) thick. Basements outcrops occur in the northeastern margin of the caldera.

About 14.5 million years ago volcanic activity started in the region, first west of Galán but by 7 million years ago it shifted to the future caldera, forming the Cerro Colorado, Pabellon and Cerro Toconquis composite volcanoes on its future western rim. The more westerly centres are today represented by eroded volcanoes. Since about 6.6 million years ago the volcanic activity produced rocks of both mafic (Note: A volcanic rock relatively rich in iron and magnesium, relative to silicon.) and silicic compositions. The increase of volcanic activity has been attributed to the steepening of the Nazca Plate slab which allowed mantle material to penetrate into the space between the lower crust and the slab. North of 21° degrees southern latitude ignimbritic volcanism started earlier, generating the Altos de Pica and Oxaya formations.

Mafic volcanism occurred south and west of Galán both before its large eruption and afterwards, in the valley of Antofagasta de la Sierra and may have continued to less than ten thousand years ago. The positions of the exact vents are controlled by recent fault systems in the region.

Since about 10 million years ago, the area has been subject to reverse faulting which has disrupted the basement along north–south lines, forming a rift valley that also stretches from north to south. The magma erupted by the Galán system was likewise channelled along such fault systems, and neighbouring volcanoes were similarly influenced by them; the fault systems at Galán proper are known as the Diablillos-Galán faults. Another major lineament in the area is the Archibarca lineament, which is formed by a strike-slip fault that extends from the northwest to the southeast in the region and which intersects the Diablillos-Galán faults at the location of the caldera.

=== Composition ===
Galán has erupted mainly potassium-rich dacitic to rhyolitic rocks that are often called rhyodacitic, and which reflect a calc-alkaline suite. Each ignimbrite has usually a uniform composition but there is some variation between individual ignimbrites; for example older rocks contain amphibole and younger rocks instead sanidine. Minerals contained in the eruption products include allanite, apatite, biotite, hornblende, ilmenite, magnetite, orthopyroxene, plagioclase, quartz, sanidine and zircon. Hydrothermal alteration has left calcite in some rocks. Trace element patterns are distinct in the Galán ignimbrite in comparison to the Toconquis Group rocks.

The formation of the Galán magma has been explained with melting of lower crustal rocks under the influence of rising basaltic magmas that supplied the heat needed for the melting processes, and which also directly contributed to magma formation through mixing events. Further metasomatism in the crust and fractional crystallization processes completed the magma genesis process. Probably under the influence of larger scale tectonics, magma that accumulated into a mid-crustal mush zone is eventually transferred into shallow magma chambers at depths of 8–4 kilometres (5.0–2.5 mi); recharge events where deep magma entered the shallow magma bodies may have triggered eruptions at Galán. After eruption, a leftover pluton would have been generated inside the crust.

Based on the presence of two separate populations of pumice in the Galán ignimbrite it has been inferred that there were two types of magma in the magmatic system during the Galán eruption, a larger volume of so-called "white" magma and a "grey" magma which was injected into the "white" magma pool and eventually rose above the latter. More generally, it appears that before each eruption there were two batches of magma present beneath the volcano which however were very similar owing perhaps to a homogenization process that took place deep in the crust. Before the eruption, the magma is estimated to have been 790–820 °C (1,450–1,510 °F) hot.

== Climate and biology ==
Galán lies in a region of arid climate, with annual precipitation amounting to about 65 millimetres per year (2.6 in/year). Frosts occur year-round. Climate data are known for Salar de Hombre Muerto north of Galán; average temperatures there are 8–23 °C (46–73 °F) in summer and winter, respectively. Precipitation occurs mostly during the summer months.

At high elevations there is no vegetation. Between 3,900–5,000 metres (12,800–16,400 ft) elevation, vegetation consists of high altitude steppe dominated by Poaceae (grasses) such as Festuca (fescue) and Stipa (feather grass). At lower altitudes, wetlands have their own vegetation. In sheltered areas birds like ducks and flamingos can be observed.

== Eruptive history ==
Volcanic activity at Galán occurred in two separate stages, which are separated by an erosional unconformity during which the ignimbrite apron of the Toconquis group was incised by deep valleys. Mechanistically, the onset of the eruptions has been explained with delamination events during which parts of the lower crust broke off, asthenospheric material replaced the crust lost by delamination and basaltic magmas penetrated the remaining crust.

These stages have left an ignimbrite plateau that surrounds the caldera except on its southern side, and which is noticeable on satellite images. It covers a surface area of about 3,500 square kilometres (1,400 sq mi) and is the largest ignimbrite system in the Puna plateau.

=== Toconquis Group ===
The first stage occurred between 5.60 and 4.51 million years ago and consisted of the eruption of large ignimbrites such as the Blanco, Cueva Negra, several Merihuaca ignimbrites and Real Grande ignimbrite as well as lava domes, all from north–south trending fractures, forming the Toconquis Group (formerly called the Toconquis Formation). The Real Grande and Cueva Negra ignimbrites were considered to be homologous, as are the easterly Leon Muerto and several Merihuaca ignimbrites, but it was later found that the Leon Muerto and Merihuaca ignimbrites probably were erupted from distinct vent systems and have distinct compositions, and the Cueva Negra ignimbrite was later considered to be a separate formation from the other Toconquis group ignimbrites. The later classifications established a 6.5 – 5.5 million-year-old Blanco/Merihuaca ignimbrites, 4.8 million-year-old Pitas, 4.7 million-year-old Real Grande, 4.5 million-year-old Vega and 3.8 million-year-old Cueva Negra ignimbrite.

The formation is fairly heterogeneous, with some ignimbrites separated by sharp contacts and the degree of welding and crystal content of pumices varies from one ignimbrite to the other. Generally the ignimbrites are rich in crystals and pumice, are unwelded and contain few flow structures, with the exception of the welded Cueva Negra ignimbrite. Some ignimbrite eruptions were preceded by the formation of Plinian eruption columns that generated ash fallout, and there is evidence for pulsating flow in the ignimbrites.

On the northern side of the Galán complex, ignimbrites extend up to 80 kilometres (50 mi) away from the caldera and may have reached even larger distances prior to erosion, and they have thicknesses of 300 metres (980 ft). The ignimbrites have a total volume of about 650 cubic kilometres (160 cu mi), with the Real Grande ignimbrite comprising over half of its volume. The volume of the individual ignimbrites increases the younger they are with the initial Blanco and Merihuaca ignimbrites having a volume of about 70 cubic kilometres (17 cu mi).

The last eruption may have generated a caldera that was later obliterated. Emission of lava flows occurred during the Toconquis phase as well, in general there was vigorous volcanic activity between the eruptions that formed the main ignimbrites. The Cueva Negra ignimbrite was emplaced after the Toconquis Group, and small lava domes and pyroclastic flows continued to be erupted until the Galán ignimbrite proper. The magmatic system shallowed during this time, resulting in composition changes of the erupted ignimbrites and a general increase of elevations in the region.

=== Galán ignimbrite ===
2.08 ± 0.02 million years ago the rhyodacitic Galán ignimbrite proper was emplaced. Aside from a facies that remained inside the caldera and is minimally 1.4 kilometres (0.87 mi) thick, ignimbrites extend outside of the caldera to distances of 80 kilometres (50 mi) but with an average runout distance of 40 square kilometres (15 sq mi) and have thicknesses of 200–10 metres (656–33 ft); closer to the caldera it has been largely eroded away and there are more complete exposures farther away from Galán. A contrary view is that the Galán ignimbrite was largely eroded only on its northern side by wind action, forming yardangs. The resurgent dome consists of Galán ignimbrite material, along with basement rocks. The "Toba Dacitica" 270 kilometres (170 mi) outcrop away from the volcano was once considered part of the Galán eruption but later compositional differences were found.

The Galán ignimbrite is fairly homogeneous and has a high crystal content; overall it appears that the eruption commenced and reached large dimensions fairly quickly without leaving time for an eruption column or distinct flow units to form, except in some places. Conversely, the produced flows were relatively slow flows that had little capacity to pass above topographic obstacles or to move rocks around. It nevertheless spread over large distances, since the topography of the region had been flattened by the previous Toconquis ignimbrites, and was still hot by the time it came to a standstill. Pumice is scarce and usually present in only small fragments, and lithic fragments are also uncommon except at the bases of the deposit. Fiamme structures on the other hand are fairly common especially where the ignimbrite crossed river valleys. The ignimbrite displays varying degrees of welding but has often spectacular columnar joints.

At first it was assumed that this ignimbrite crops out over a surface of 7,500 square kilometres (2,900 sq mi) but later it was found that it covers a surface closer to 2,400 square kilometres (930 sq mi). Between the intracaldera ignimbrite, the parts of the ignimbrite that extend away from the caldera and outcrops at large distance, the volume is about 650 cubic kilometres (160 cu mi), down from earlier estimated of volumes exceeding 1,000 cubic kilometres (240 cu mi) but the Galán eruption is still one of the biggest known volcanic eruptions and the volcano has produced almost half of the volume of ignimbrites in the southern Puna. The Galán ignimbrite is the largest ignimbrite erupted by this centre; there is a tendency of the volume of individual ignimbrites to increase as the volcanoes grow younger, not only at Galán but also at other Puna ignimbrite centres, and this may be a consequence of progressive changes in the crust. Such giant eruptions have not been observed during historical time and are considered to be among the most dangerous volcanic phenomena known.

Kay et al. proposed that the Galán ignimbrite consisted of three separate units, an intracaldera one emplaced 2.13 million years ago and two extracaldera ones 2.09 and 2.06 million years ago.

=== Post-Galán volcanism ===
The main Galán caldera formed during the Galán ignimbrite eruption, and it is possible that the collapse of the magma chamber roof actually started the eruption. Later it was found that a trapdoor collapse is a more plausible interpretation of the caldera structure and that the caldera appears to be much smaller than its present-day topographic expression. Most likely a lake formed within the caldera after its eruption.

Later volcanic activity resulted in lava flows of dacitic composition being erupted along the ring fault of the caldera, as well as the formation of the resurgent dome by about 2 kilometres (1.2 mi) uplift along the eastern caldera margin fault. This uplift encompasses both Galán ignimbrite rocks but also parts of the basement, the latter especially in the southern part of the dome. Post-caldera volcanism occurred on the northern margin of the caldera 2.01 ± 0.28 million years ago, and several small ignimbrites were emplaced after the main Galán eruption until less than 2 million years ago. These ignimbrites have similar compositions to the Galán ignimbrite and were formed from magma left over by the main Galán eruption. The onset of resurgence within the caldera may have been triggered by the same magma that is responsible for the post-caldera volcanism along the eastern caldera rims. The post-caldera volcanic systems appear to be rather ill-defined, however. The most recent activity was of tectonic nature and consists of movements along the faults and mafic volcanism ("Incahuasi Formation") farther west. Seismic tomography indicates that there is still a melt zone under Galán, the "Cerro Galán Mush Body".

The volcano produces about 200 kilograms (440 lb) carbon dioxide per day, often within the hot springs and surrounding terrain. The pre-caldera rocks contain the hydrothermal system, which is supplied both by the mantle and by precipitation and has a power output of about 2.09–10.85 megawatts (2,800–14,550 hp). A phreatic explosion took place at La Colcha at some point in the past, and stronger hydrothermal activity was necessary to emplace the travertines. An earthquake swarm was recorded on the 25 January 2009 mainly under the resurgent dome, and may reflect hydrothermal or magmatic activity.

== See also ==
- Cerro Beltrán
- List of volcanoes in Argentina
