= Andean Volcanic Belt =

Volcanic belt in South America

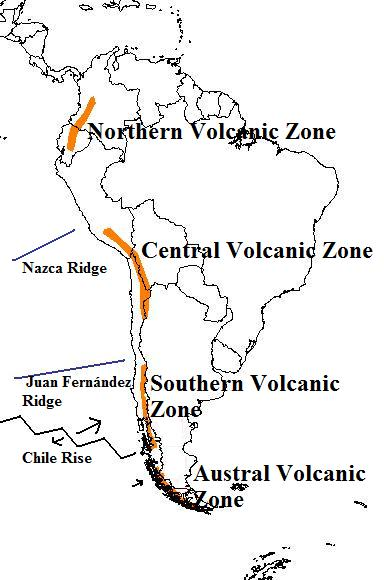
Map of the volcanic arcs in the Andes and subducted structures affecting volcanism

The Andean Volcanic Belt is a major volcanic belt along the Andean cordillera in Argentina, Bolivia, Chile, Colombia, Ecuador, and Peru. It is formed as a result of subduction of the Nazca plate and Antarctic plate underneath the South American plate. The belt is subdivided into four main volcanic zones which are separated by volcanic gaps. The volcanoes of the belt are diverse in terms of activity style, products, and morphology. While some differences can be explained by which volcanic zone a volcano belongs to, there are significant differences within volcanic zones and even between neighboring volcanoes. Despite being a type location for calc-alkalic and subduction volcanism, the Andean Volcanic Belt has a broad range of volcano-tectonic settings, as it has rift systems and extensional zones, transpressional faults, subduction of mid-ocean ridges and seamount chains as well as a large range of crustal thicknesses and magma ascent paths and different amounts of crustal assimilations.

Romeral in Colombia is the northernmost active member of the Andean Volcanic Belt. South of latitude 49° S within the Austral Volcanic Zone volcanic activity decreases with the southernmost volcano Fueguino in Tierra del Fuego archipelago.

== Volcanic zones ==
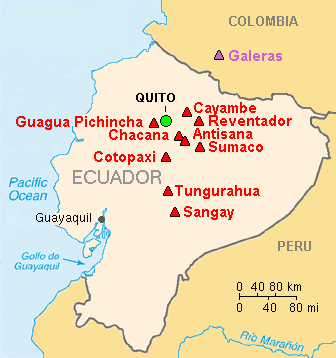
Map of the major Colombian (left) and Ecuadorian (right) volcanoes

The Andean Volcanic Belt is segmented into four main areas of active volcanism; the Northern, Central, Southern, and Austral volcanic zones, each of which is a separate continental volcanic arc.

=== Northern Volcanic Zone ===
The Northern Volcanic Zone (NVZ) extends from Colombia to Ecuador and includes all volcanoes on the continental mainland of these countries. Of the volcanoes in this zone, 55 are located in Ecuador, while 19 are in Colombia. In Ecuador, the volcanoes are located in the Cordillera Occidental and the Cordillera Real while in Colombia they are located in the Western and Central Ranges. The Pliocene Iza-Paipa volcanic complex in Boyacá, in the Eastern Ranges is the northernmost manifestation of the Northern Andean Volcanic Belt. The volcanic arc has formed due to subduction of the Nazca plate underneath western South America. Some volcanoes of the Northern Volcanic Zone, such as Galeras and Nevado del Ruiz that lie in densely populated highland areas, are significant sources of hazards. It has been estimated that crustal thickness beneath this region varies from around 40 to perhaps more than 55 kilometres (34 mi). Sangay is the southernmost volcano of the Northern Volcanic Zone.

The Geophysics Institute at the National Polytechnic School in Quito, Ecuador houses an international team of seismologists and volcanologists whose responsibility is to monitor Ecuador's numerous active volcanoes in the Andean Volcanic Belt (which is part of the Ring of Fire) and the Galápagos Islands.

=== Central Volcanic Zone ===
The Central Volcanic Zone (CVZ) is a volcanic arc in western South America and is one of the four volcanic zones of the Andes. The Central Volcanic Zone extends from Peru to Chile and forms the western boundary of the Altiplano plateau. The volcanic arc has formed due to subduction of the Nazca plate under western South America along the Peru–Chile Trench. To the south, the CVZ is limited by the Pampean flat-slab segment or Norte Chico flat-slab segment, a region devoid of volcanism due to a lower subduction angle caused by the subduction of Juan Fernández Ridge.

The CVZ is characterized by a continental crust that reaches a thickness of approximately 70 km (43 mi). Within this zone, there are 44 major and 18 minor volcanic centers that are considered to be active. This volcanic zone also contains not less than six potentially active large silicic volcanic systems, which include those of the Altiplano-Puna Volcanic Complex, as are Cerro Panizos, Pastos Grandes, Cerro Guacha, and La Pacana. Other silicic systems are Los Frailes ignimbrite plateau in Bolivia, and the caldera complexes of Incapillo and Cerro Galán in Argentina.

=== Southern Volcanic Zone ===
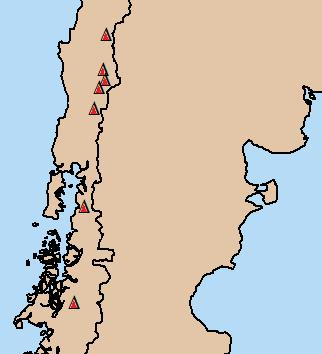
Map of the volcanoes of the Southern Volcanic Zone that erupted in the 1990–2011 period.

The South Volcanic Zone (SVZ) extends roughly from Central Chile's Andes at the latitude of Santiago, at ca. 33°S, to Cerro Arenales in Aysén Region at ca. 46°S, a distance of well over 870 mi (1,400 km). The arc has formed due to the subduction of the Nazca plate under the South American plate along the Peru–Chile Trench. The northern boundary of the SVZ is marked by the flat-slab subduction of the Juan Fernández Ridge, which is believed to have produced a volcanic gap called the Pampean flat-slab segment in the Norte Chico region since the late Miocene. The southern end of the SVZ is marked by the Chile triple junction where the Chile Rise subducts under South America at the Taitao Peninsula, giving origin to the Patagonian Volcanic Gap. Further south lies the Austral Volcanic Zone.

From north to south the Southern Volcanic Zone is divided into four segments according to the characteristics of the continental crust, volcanoes and volcanic rocks:

- Northern SVZ (NSVZ; 33°S–34°30′S)
- Transitional SVZ (TSVZ; 34°30′S–37°S)
- Central SVZ (CSVZ; 37°S–41.5°S)
- Southern SVZ (SSVZ: 41.5°S–46°S)

In Central Southern Volcanic Zone and Southern Southern Volcanic Zone, magma ascent occurs primarily by the Liquiñe-Ofqui Fault.

The Principal Cordillera of Andes (east Santiago) rose in late Cenozoic and became extensively glaciated about one million years ago. This meant lavas from NSVZ volcanoes begun to be channeled along a network of glacial valleys ever since. The Maipo caldera exploded about 450 thousand years ago, leaving behind copious amounts of ash and ignimbrite rock that can be observed today both in Chile and Argentina.

During the Pliocene, the SVZ south of 38°S consisted of a broad volcanic arc. The area with volcanic activity 1 to 2 million years ago between 39°S-42°S was up to 300 km (190 mi) wide (if back-arc volcanism is included). A reduction in the convergence rate of the Nazca and the South American plate from 9 cm (3.5 in) per year to 7.9 cm (3.1 in) per year 2–3 million years ago contributed to a narrowing of the southern SVZ that occurred possibly 1.6 million years ago. The southern part of the SVZ retained vigorous activity only in the west, especially around the Liquiñe-Ofqui Fault Zone, while eastern volcanoes such as Tronador and Cerro Pantoja became extinct.

The magmas of modern (Holocene) volcanoes in the Transitional Southern Volcanic Zone are derived from heterogenous sources in the Earth's mantle. Many lesser parts of melts are derived from subducted oceanic crust and subducted sediments. Towards the east, in the backarc region, the degree of melting in the mantle that originated volcanism is less than that of the subducted crust influences.

Several volcanoes of the SVZ are being monitored by the Southern Andean Volcano Observatory (OVDAS) based in Temuco. The volcanoes monitored have varied over time, but some, like Villarrica and Llaima, are monitored constantly. In recent years, there have been major eruptions at Chaitén (2008–2010), Cordón Caulle (2011) and Calbuco (2015).

=== Austral Volcanic Zone ===
The Austral Volcanic Zone (AVZ) is a volcanic arc in the Andes of southwestern South America. It is one of the four volcanic zones of the Andes. The AVZ extends south of the Patagonian Volcanic Gap to Tierra del Fuego archipelago, a distance of well over 600 mi (1,000 km). The arc has formed due to subduction of the Antarctic plate under the South American plate. Eruption products consist chiefly of alkaline basalt and basanite. Volcanism in the Austral Volcanic Zone is less vigorous than in the Southern Volcanic Zone. Recorded eruptions are rare due to the area being unexplored well into the 19th century; the cloudy weather of its western coast might also have prevented sightings of eruptions. The Austral Volcanic Zone hosts both glaciated stratovolcanoes as well as subglacial volcanoes under the Southern Patagonian Ice Field.

== Volcanic gaps ==
The different volcanic zones are intercalated by volcanic gaps, zones that, despite lying at the right distance from an oceanic trench, lack volcanic activity. The Andes has three major volcanic gaps the Peruvian flat-slab segment (3 °S–15 °S), the Pampean flat-slab segment (27 °S–33 °S) and the Patagonian Volcanic Gap (46 °S–49 °S). The first one separates the Northern from the Central Volcanic Zone, the second the Central from the Southern and the last separates the Southern from the Austral Volcanic Zone. The Peruvian and Pampean gaps coincide with areas of flat slab (low angle) subduction and therefore the lack of volcanism is believed to be caused by the shallow dip of the subducting Nazca plate in these places. The shallow dip has in turn been explained by the subduction of the Nazca Ridge and the Juan Fernández Ridge for the Peruvian and Pampean gaps respectively. Since the Nazca and Juan Fernández Ridge are created by volcanic activity in Pacific hotspots (Easter and Juan Fernández) it can be said that volcanic activity in the Pacific is responsible for the suppression of volcanism in parts of the Andes.

The Patagonian gap is different in nature as it is caused not by the subduction of an aseismic ridge but by the subduction of the Chile Rise, the boundary ridge between the Nazca and the Antarctic plate.

=== Peruvian gap ===
Between the latitudes of 3 °S–15 °S in Peru the last volcanic activity occurred 2.7 million years ago in Cordillera Blanca. The lack of volcanism in central and northern Peru is widely attributed to a side effect of the flat-slab (low angle) subduction of the Nazca plate occurring there. While the subduction of the Nazca Ridge has often been credited for causing this flat-slab and hence the lack of volcanism, many researchers find the gap too wide to be explained by this alone.

One hypothesis claims that the flat-slab is caused by the ongoing subduction of an oceanic plateau. This hypothetical plateau named Inca Plateau would be a mirror image of the Marquesas Plateau in the South Pacific.

=== Pampean gap ===
The Pampean gap or Norte Chico separates the Andes Central and Southern volcanic zones. A low subduction angle caused by the subduction of Juan Fernández Ridge has been pointed out as causing or contributing to the suppression of volcanism.

== Magma path distribution ==
The distribution of magma paths in a volcanic system are typically controlled by the regional tectonic activity. In a typical setting, the magma path is thought to be parallel to the maximum stress (either in compressional or extensional stress regimes). In the case of the Andes, the maximum stress is oriented in the east–west direction as the Nazca plate is subducted underneath the South American plate in the eastern direction. Recent studies conducted by Tibaldi et al. have discovered that the magma paths and dyke distribution in the Andean Volcanic Belt are not parallel to the maximum stress (E-W direction). Instead, the magma path generally follows a north–south/Northwest-Southeast trend in the Andes. Tibaldi et al. concluded that the magma path distribution is actually controlled by pre-existing structures and crustal weaknesses in the crust rather than the regional stresses.

== Back-arc volcanism ==
Back-arc volcanism is a significant phenomenon in Argentine Patagonia and Mendoza Province. Flat-slab subduction along the Peru–Chile Trench during the Miocene has been pointed out as being responsible for back-arc volcanism in Mendoza and Neuquén Province during the Quaternary. Notable back-arc volcanoes include Payun Matru, Agua Poca, Payun Liso, Pali-Aike Volcanic Field, Tromen, Cochiquito Volcanic Group and Puesto Cortaderas.

Other significant back-arc volcanism regions include the Argentine Northwest where the Galán Caldera is located and the Andean foothills of Ecuador's Cordillera Real, where a series of alkaline volcanoes like Sumaco develops.

== Geothermal activity ==
The Andean Volcanic Belt represents a large geothermal province, with numerous hot springs, solfataras and geysers associated with its volcanoes. Already in the pre-Columbian era, the indigenous peoples used the various hot springs as places of healing. The geothermal exploration in the Chilean Andes was pioneered in the 1960s, although the site of El Tatio was investigated previously in the 1920s. Compared to neighboring Central America, the Andean region is poorly explored and exploited for geothermal resources.

== See also ==
- List of volcanoes in Argentina
- List of volcanoes in Bolivia
- List of volcanoes in Chile
- List of volcanoes in Peru
