= Lazufre =

Volcanic dome between Chile and Argentina

- Location within Argentina

Highest point
- Coordinates: 25°15′S 68°30′W

Lazufre is a Quaternary volcanic dome in the central Andes, on the border between Chile and Argentina. It is part of the Central Volcanic Zone (CVZ), one of the four distinct volcanic belts of South America. The CVZ includes a number of calderas and supervolcanoes that have emplaced ignimbrites in the region.

Lazufre and the majority of the Andean volcanoes formed from the subduction of the oceanic Nazca Plate under the continental South American continental lithosphere. The dome has been uplifting for the past 400,000 years and features three recent volcanoes, Lastarria, Cordón del Azufre and Cerro Bayo Complex. It may be a volcano that will in the future develop a caldera.

The dome began uplifting in the late 19th century at an increasing rate, before slowing down since 2010. The uplift is among the largest in the world and has drawn attention from the scientific communities. Various explanations have been proposed, the most common being that a magma chamber is filling up.

== Geography and geomorphology ==
The Lazufre uplift is in the Western Cordillera of the southern central Andes, on the border between Argentina (Catamarca Province) and Chile at about 4,300 metres (14,100 ft) elevation. The city of Antofagasta is about 250 kilometres (160 mi) northwest of Lazufre. Owing to the low population density, the volcanoes of the region and their eruption history are poorly known.

The Lazufre volcanic system is made up of the volcanoes Lastarria, Cordón del Azufre and Cerro Bayo. Cerro Bayo, Lastarria and Cordón del Azufre are complex volcanoes consisting of craters, lava flows and individual cones. Cordón del Azufre has produced young-looking lava flows, Lastarria is one of the most fumarolically active volcanoes in the region and a steam explosion was observed at Cerro Bayo in 2007. Their eruption products have dacitic to andesitic composition, with lesser amounts of basaltic andesite.

The uplifting area coincides with a 70-kilometre (43 mi) long and 500-metre (1,600 ft) high raised dome with a central depression, surrounded by a ring of Quaternary volcanoes that may share a common magma reservoir and were fed through a network of radial and circumferential lineaments. Among these are the Corrida de Cori-Cerro Escorial, Rio Grande northeast, Chuta southwest, Atalaya and Azufre west and Pirámide northwest of the centre of the uplift. There is no clear evidence of a caldera at Lazufre, but the Los Colorados caldera borders the dome to the southeast. There are no known geothermal manifestations except on Lastarria, although the region is rarely visited.

== Geological context ==
Off the coast of South America, the Nazca Plate subducts at a rate of 7 centimetres per year (2.8 in/year) into the Peru-Chile Trench. Subduction gives rise to the Andean Volcanic Belt, which is subdivided into four segments: The Northern Volcanic Zone, the Central Volcanic Zone (CVZ), the Southern Volcanic Zone and the Austral Volcanic Zone. The CVZ between Peru and Chile is about 1,500 kilometres (930 mi) long and includes about 50 potentially active volcanoes in Peru, Bolivia, Chile and Argentina, as well as active faults and multiple large calderas such as Galán and La Pacana. Some of the largest known explosive eruptions and enormous ignimbrites have been erupted here during the last ten million years, producing the Altiplano-Puna volcanic complex. Thirteen volcanoes have erupted during the 20th century. Satellite observations have found ongoing ground movements at volcanoes previously thought extinct, such as Uturuncu in Bolivia, which is uplifting like Azufre; others bear evidence of past uplift. Only a few CVZ volcanoes are monitored.

The region of Lastarria-Cordón del Azufre consists mostly of volcanic rocks from the Miocene to Pleistocene. Their composition ranges from andesite to dacite; basalt is less common. About 120 cubic kilometres (29 cu mi) of volcanic rocks have been emplaced there since the Pliocene, with activity migrating northwest to the Lazufre area over time. Lastarria and Cordón del Azufre have been active for the past 600,000-300,000 years.

Two major faults, the northeast–southwest trending Pedernales-Arizaro and the north-northwest-south-southeast trending Imilac-Salina del Fraile faults cross at Lazufre, and a major geological lineament named Archibarca traverses the volcanic arc there. The elliptical shape of Lazufre may reflect the regional tectonic stress pattern, which features northwest–southeast compression. The volcanic rocks overlie Permian sedimentary and metamorphic rocks. The "Southern Puna Magma Body", an area with partially molten rock in the southern Puna, extends from Lazufre to Galán.

== Climate and vegetation ==
The environment at Lazufre is characterized by an arid climate, large temperature differences between day-night and summer-winter, high insolation, dry air and intense winds. The region lacks vegetation although extremophile microbial life has been identified in salt pans in the area.

== History ==
The Lazufre uplift was discovered by Pritchard and Simons in 2002, when ERS radar data found that the terrain was rising. They named it after the acronym of Lastarria and Cordón del Azufre. The uplift affects an elliptical area with dimensions of 40 by 30 kilometres (25 mi × 19 mi) or 70 kilometres (43 mi), making it one of the largest in the world; the area may or may not have increased over time. The uplifting area is centered approximately between Lastarria and Cordón del Azufre, with rates decreasing with distance from the centre.

Uplift was first seen in 1995, but lack of data precludes a definitive determination of when it began. Rates increased from 1 centimetre per year (0.39 in/year) between 1996 and 2000 to 2.5 centimetres per year (0.98 in/year) in 2005. Between March 2003 and June 2005, the total uplift reached 57 ± 3 millimetres (2.24 ± 0.12 in), implying a volume change of about 0.0139 ± 0.0003 cubic kilometres per year (0.0001057 ± 2.3×10^{−6} cu mi/Ms) during that time. Between 2003 and 2008, the uplift totalled 15.5 centimetres (6.1 in). The rate decreased from 3 centimetres per year (1.2 in/year) over 1.5 centimetres per year (0.59 in/year) between 2006 and 2011 to 11.2 ± 1.7 millimetres per year (0.441 ± 0.067 in/year) between 2018 and 2021. The distribution of volcanic vents and direction of lava flows in the Lazufre region is consistent with the dome beginning to form about 400,000 years ago, but no uplift took place during the past 16,000 years as old lake shorelines have not been tilted.

Viewed from above, the source of the uplift has an elliptical shape, striking north with a dip to the east, and lies at 7–15 kilometres (4.3–9.3 mi) depth. It may be cone- or sill-shaped; the deformation pattern alone cannot indicate the shape of its source. Atmospheric and topographic effects can modify the appearance of the uplifted area to satellites and need to be corrected for when evaluating its shape and extent.

Magnetotelluric analysis has identified the source region and a structure descending from the source to the mantle and the asthenospheric wedge, which may constitute a magma conduit feeding the uplift. The conduit may be filled with about 5-8% (by volume) of magma. Seismic velocity anomalies have found a low seismic velocity zone in the crust under the dome, which may be the magma chamber that is causing the uplift. Other seismic velocity anomalies are linked to Lastarria volcano and form a circumferential pattern around the dome; they may be a separate magma chamber of Lastarria and its hydrothermal system. The Lazufre magmatic system may be somehow linked to a crustal area filled with magma under the Puna, the Southern Puna Magmatic Body.

Common mechanisms for such uplift in volcanoes are the entry of new magma into a magma chamber, fractional crystallization processes that increase its volume, melting of rocks surrounding a magma chamber, pressure changes within a geothermal system, perhaps caused through heating by magma, and sidewards growth of a magma reservoir. The rapid onset of uplift points to new magma as the cause; basaltic magma would fill the magma chamber and trigger fractional crystallization processes that cause ulterior volume increases, and the volume change rate is comparable to the growth rate of plutons. The distribution of volcanic vents and lineaments at Lazufre is consistent with crust breaking up under pressure from below. The recent uplift at Lazufre might be a short-term fluctuation in a longer-term uplift that averages about 1 millimetre per year (0.039 in/year) caused by repeated sill-like magma intrusions. The 1995 Antofagasta earthquake and other earthquakes in the following two years may have activated the magmatic system, initiating the recent uplift episode.

Similar uplift episodes have been recorded at other volcanoes, such as Yellowstone, Uzon, Three Sisters, Long Valley Caldera, Laguna del Maule and Hualca Hualca; the uplifting area at Lazufre is among the largest in the world. It is often accompanied by seismic swarms and sometimes stops and reverses after some time. Uplift is caused by the injection of magma that pressurizes the magmatic system, until volatiles start escaping and cause subsidence and seismic activity. Lazufre is unusual among uplifting volcanoes as it is not associated with a known caldera or a long-lived volcano. Active degassing at Salar de Pajonales may be associated with the uplift at Lazufre.

A smaller, 2-kilometre (1.2 mi) wide uplifting area is found at Lastarria volcano. Its behaviour over time resembles that of Lazufre, indicating that there might be similar mechanisms involved in both uplifts. Lastarria may constitute a "pressure valve" of the Lazufre system, or be affected by changes in tectonic stress caused by the deeper source. A change in the gas composition at Lastarria between 2009 and 2012 may indicate that the fumaroles are increasingly influenced by magma at shallow depths. Seismic activity has been recorded at Lastarria.

=== Monitoring ===
The ongoing uplift has drawn scientific attention to the Lazufre volcanoes, and may herald renewed volcanic activity. GPS stations were installed 2010–2011 at Lazufre to monitor the uplift, followed by several seismic stations in 2011–2013.

As the region is remote and difficult to access, remote sensing has been used to investigate volcanism. A common remote observation technique is InSAR, in which comparisons between synthetic aperture radar images taken from different satellite observations are used to identify changes in the topography, such as uplift. The extremely arid climate makes remote sensing easier, as water vapour interferes with radar-based remote sensing.

=== Future ===
The topography at Lazufre, with a raised area surrounded by volcanoes, resembles a developing caldera. The accumulating magma could eventually reach the surface, causing a volcanic eruption. Caldera-forming eruptions like Toba and Santorini are among the most devastating volcanic eruptions, and Lazufre has a size comparable to that of supervolcanoes. Ground uplift has preceded historical impactful eruptions, such as the 2010 eruptions of Eyjafjallajökull.

Not all uplift leads to eruptions, however, especially in the central Andes where numerous erupting volcanoes have shown no uplift and deforming volcanoes have not erupted. It is not clear whether the magma chamber at Lazufre has reached a sufficient magma volume and thickness to cause roof failure, and magma content does not appear to be sufficient for an eruption. Since the volcano is remote, renewed activity may not constitute a specific threat to property or people.
