= Salar de Gorbea =

Salt flat in Chile

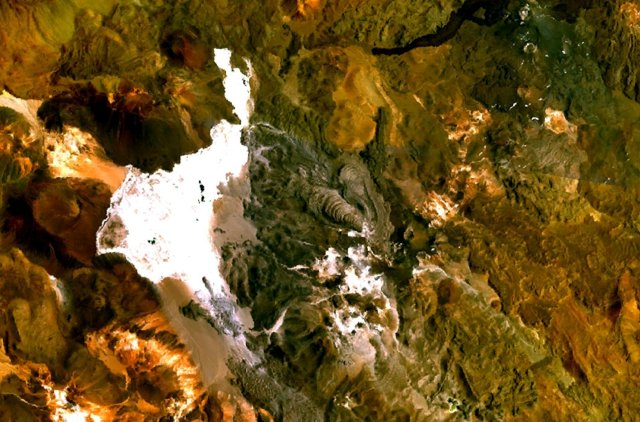
- Salar de Gorbea (white) from space
- Interactive map of Salar de Gorbea
- Location: Chile, Atacama Region
- Coordinates: 25.41°S 68.67°W
- Surface elevation: 3,946 metres (12,946 ft)

Salar de Gorbea is a salt flat just south of the border between the Antofagasta and Atacama regions, within Chile but close to the border with Argentina.

== The salt flat ==
Salar de Gorbea lies at the margin of the Puna and the Atacama Desert. It covers a surface area of 32 square kilometres (12 sq mi) and lies at an elevation of 3,944 metres (12,940 ft), in an area where access is difficult. The salt flat has an irregular shape, a square-shaped southern basin with an irregularly shaped bay to the northeast. Salar de Gorbea features both salty sediments, a salt crust and water-filled ponds. The crust is about a metre thick, contains liquid brine and is largely covered by gypsum crystals. A gypsum deposit has formed at the northeastern margin of Salar de Gorbea. Despite the name, the salt crusts are not flat, but have a topography of about 2 metres (6 ft 7 in) formed by e.g. wind-formed dunes.

At some points, saltwater crops out in depressions, forming seven lakes up to a metre deep with various colours, which contain gypsum crystals The ponds may have formed through the dissolution of salt and through wind-driven erosion. Their water is, unusual for the region, acidic, probably due to the high availability of sulfur which yields sulfuric acid and the exhaustion of the buffer capacity of the rock. The total water surface is about 0.5 square kilometres (0.19 sq mi). There are diffuse springs at the margins of Salar de Gorbea. Water reaches Salar de Gorbea mostly from the east in the form of small creeks. A 15 kilometres (9.3 mi) long tributary joins Salar de Gorbea from the south.

== Chemistry ==
Salar de Gorbea contains gypsum as the main salt, crystals are up to 30 centimetres (12 in) long. Thenardite occurs at its southern reaches and there is amorphous silica, clay, epsomite and limonite. Other rare salt types form efflorescences at the margins of the salar. There is evidence that the salts in Salar de Gorbea are presently dissolving. The Salar de Gorbea environment has been described as a potential Mars analogue.

== Biology ==
The bacterial population of the salar has been investigated to determine their taxonomy, research has yielded new species and genera. The ponds often contain microbial mats. There are also diatoms and green algae, which sometimes get encased in the gypsum crystals. Its flora is poorly studied and probably consists entirely of halophyte plants at its margins. There are not many animals in the region, and none have been reported from the salar waters.

== Catchment ==
The salt flat is nourished by a small watershed with an area of 336 square kilometres (130 sq mi). It is delimited to the east by the Cordon del Azufre, Cerro Bayo Complex and Cerro Atalaya, by Cerro los Patitos to the south and the Sierra de Gorbea to the west; other basins in the area are Salar de Pajonales, Salar de la Azufrera to the west and Salar Ignorado to the south. The rocks in the basin are entirely volcanic, mostly of Pleistocene age, many volcanoes are eroded and there is no evidence of recent activity except for a steam eruption at Cerro Bayo in 2007. Some of the volcanoes feature raw sulfur deposits.

== Climate ==
Salar de Gorbea has an extreme climate characterized by dry air, high aridity, strong winds, high insolation and extreme temperature fluctuations between day and night and between seasons. Annual precipitation only reaches 140 millimetres (5.5 in) and the annual mean temperature is about −1 °C (30 °F); winter temperatures can drop to −30 °C (−22 °F). During the late Pleistocene, the climate of the Altiplano was wetter but there is no evidence of former shorelines although the gypsum crust was partially eroded during Holocene wet periods. Strong winds blow in the area, forming large dust devils on the salar that can reportedly transport gravel. Snow accumulates on the mountains at Salar de Gorbea and their meltwater is a major water source for the salar.

== Bibliography ==
- Alonso; Risacher; Salazar (1999). Geoquímica de aguas en cuencas cerradas: I, II y III regiones-Chile (PDF) (Report). Vol. IV. Archived from the original (PDF) on 1 November 2019.
- Benison, Kathleen Counter; Karmanocky, Francis J. (July 2014). "Could microorganisms be preserved in Mars gypsum? Insights from terrestrial examples". Geology. 42 (7): 615–618. doi:10.1130/G35542.1.
- Benison, Kathleen C.; O'Neill, William K.; Blain, David; Hallsworth, John E. (June 2021). "Water Activities of Acid Brine Lakes Approach the Limit for Life". Astrobiology. 21 (6): 729–740. Bibcode:2021AsBio..21..729B. doi:10.1089/ast.2020.2334. ISSN 1531-1074. PMC 8219186. PMID 33819431.
- Benison, Kathleen C. (21 February 2019). "The Physical and Chemical Sedimentology of Two High-Altitude Acid Salars in Chile: Sedimentary Processes In An Extreme Environment". Journal of Sedimentary Research. 89 (2): 147–167. doi:10.2110/jsr.2019.9. S2CID 135031173.
- Chong Díaz, Guillermo; Demergasso, Cecilia; Urrutia Meza, Javier; Vargas A., Marina (28 November 2020). "El Dominio Salino del norte de Chile y sus yacimientos de minerales industriales". Boletín de la Sociedad Geológica Mexicana (in Spanish). 72 (3) A020720. doi:10.18268/bsgm2020v72n3a020720. ISSN 1405-3322. S2CID 229451952.
- Escudero, Lorena; Oetiker, Nia; Gallardo, Karem; Tebes-Cayo, Cinthya; Guajardo, Mariela; Nuñez, Claudia; Davis-Belmar, Carol; Pueyo, J. J.; Chong Díaz, Guillermo; Demergasso, Cecilia (1 August 2018). "A thiotrophic microbial community in an acidic brine lake in Northern Chile". Antonie van Leeuwenhoek. 111 (8): 1403–1419. doi:10.1007/s10482-018-1087-8. ISSN 1572-9699. PMID 29748902. S2CID 254229013.
- Heavens, Nicholas G. (May 2017). "Of kangaroo rats and gypsum gravel: Probing the extremes of aeolian transport in the present and the past". Geology. 45 (5): 479–480. Bibcode:2017Geo....45..479H. doi:10.1130/focus052017.1.
- Niemeyer, Hans F. (1980). Hoyas hidrográficas de Chile, Segunda Región (PDF). Santiago de Chile: Ministerio de Obras Públicas (Chile), Dirección General de Aguas. Archived from the original (PDF) on 4 March 2016.
- Pueyo, JuanJosé; Demergasso, Cecilia; Escudero, Lorena; Chong, Guillermo; Cortéz-Rivera, Paulina; Sanjurjo-Sánchez, Jorge; Carmona, Virginia; Giralt, Santiago (20 July 2021). "On the origin of saline compounds in acidic salt flats (Central Andean Altiplano)". Chemical Geology. 574 120155. doi:10.1016/j.chemgeo.2021.120155. hdl:2445/184092. ISSN 0009-2541. S2CID 233653266.
- Risacher, François; Fritz, Bertrand (1 February 2009). "Origin of Salts and Brine Evolution of Bolivian and Chilean Salars". Aquatic Geochemistry. 15 (1): 123–157. doi:10.1007/s10498-008-9056-x. ISSN 1573-1421. S2CID 128494108.
- Risacher, François; Alonso, Hugo; Salazar, Carlos (1 July 2002). "Hydrochemistry of two adjacent acid saline lakes in the Andes of northern Chile". Chemical Geology. 187 (1): 39–57. doi:10.1016/S0009-2541(02)00021-9. ISSN 0009-2541.
- Risacher, François; Alonso, Hugo; Salazar, Carlos (November 2003). "The origin of brines and salts in Chilean salars: a hydrochemical review". Earth-Science Reviews. 63 (3–4): 249–293. Bibcode:2003ESRv...63..249R. doi:10.1016/S0012-8252(03)00037-0.
