= Lastarria =

Stratovolcano on the border between Chile and Argentina

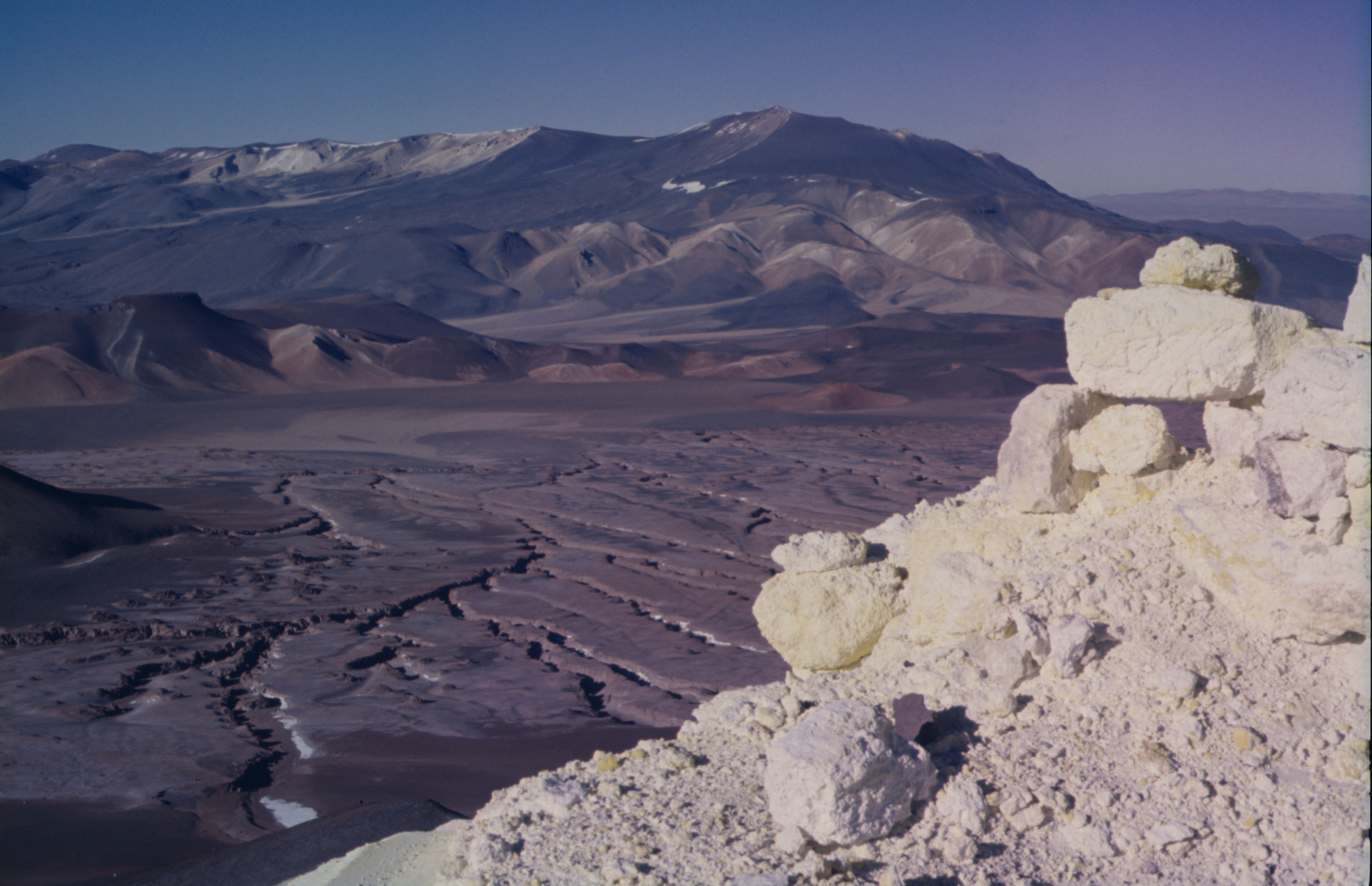
- Lastarria seen from Mina La Casualidad

Highest point
- Elevation: 5,706 m (18,720 ft)
- Coordinates: 25°10′S 68°31′W

Geography
- Location within Chile
- Location: Chile, Argentina
- Region, Province: Antofagasta Region Salta Province
- Parent range: Central Andes

Geology
- Rock age: Pleistocene-Holocene (900,000 to 2400 years BP)
- Mountain type: Stratovolcano
- Volcanic belt: Central Volcanic Zone
- Last eruption: 2460 ± 50/60 years BP

Lastarria is a 5,697 metres (18,691 ft) high stratovolcano that lies on the border between Chile and Argentina. It is remote, and the surroundings are uninhabited but can be reached through an unpaved road. The volcano is part of the Central Volcanic Zone, one of the four segments of the volcanic arc of the Andes. Over a thousand volcanoes—of which about 50 are active—lie in this over 1,500 kilometres (930 mi) long chain of volcanoes, which is generated by subduction of the Nazca Plate beneath the South American Plate.

The volcano is constituted by two volcanic edifices that form a ridge, and one subsidiary lava flow field southwest of the main volcanoes. The main edifice features several aligned craters that form a line. There is no recorded eruptive activity, but the volcano displays vigorous fumarolic activity on its northern side and within the craters. It is located on top of older volcanic rocks and features both andesite and dacite.

Lastarria produced a large landslide deposit when part of its southeastern flank collapsed. From a 1 kilometre (0.62 mi) wide collapse scar, the landslide descended over a distance of 8 kilometres (5.0 mi). The intense fumarolic activity makes the volcano the largest source of volcanic gases in the region, and has produced fumarolic vent deposits as well as flows of molten sulfur. A progressive uplift of the terrain around Lastarria and farther south has been recognized; it appears to reflect a deep magma intrusion in the region.

== Geography and structure ==
Lastarria is situated in the Central Andes, in the Antofagasta Region of Chile, and straddles the border with Argentina's Salta Province. The city of Antofagasta lies 250 kilometres (160 mi) northwest of Lastarria. The Central Andes are difficult to access and its volcanoes are usually poorly monitored. There are no human populations within 150 kilometres (93 mi) of Lastarria. From the former Catalina railway station 120 kilometres (75 mi) west, an unpaved road leads to Lastarria. Unlike most other volcanoes in the region, no Inka archeological site has been found on Lastarria. Either the volcano was too active or too unimportant in pre-Hispanic times.

Lastarria is part of the Andean Central Volcanic Zone, which extends over 1,500 kilometres (930 mi) from Peru to Chile. Over 1,000 volcanic edifices have been identified in this zone, of which about 50 volcanoes are active or potentially active, with many exceeding 6,000 metres (20,000 ft) in altitude. In addition, the zone features 18 monogenetic volcanoes and about 6 caldera/ignimbrite systems.

=== Edifice proper ===
Lastarria is formed by two coalesced edifices, the main cone and the older South Spur (Espolón Sur), which are joined at an altitude of about 5,500 metres (18,000 ft) and form a 10-kilometre (6.2 mi) long ridge. The main cone comprises lava domes, lava flows, pyroclastic flows, and scoria, and reaches a summit height of 5,697 metres (18,691 ft). Most of the volcano is covered by pyroclastic material, some of which extends to the southeastern margin of the Salar de Aguas Calientes. Lava flows are exposed mainly on the northwestern slope, where they reach thicknesses of 40 metres (130 ft). The South Spur has also generated lava flows. The volcano covers a surface area of about 156 square kilometres (60 sq mi).

Five overlapping craters are aligned in a north–south line on Lastarria's main cone, the craters 5-4 and 3-2 are nested within each other (counted from south to north). Volcanic activity has migrated north during the history of Lastarria, and the most recent eruption products are found on the northern and western slopes. A lava dome sits on the northernmost crater rim. The South Spur has two craters.

The volcano rises from a terrain of about 4,200 metres (13,800 ft) altitude and has fairly steep slopes. Much of the surface, including the Southern Spur, is covered by deposits left by volcanic ash fall. Some parts of the Southern Spur display evidence of hydrothermal alteration. The total volume of the edifice is about 10.1 cubic kilometres (2.4 cu mi).

The Negriales del Lastarria (also known as Big Joe) lava flow complex lies southwest of the Lastarria volcano and covers a large surface area. It is formed by several massive flows erupted from a single vent during three or eight pulses; the longest reaches a length of 10 kilometres (6.2 mi). These lavas are block lavas with flow ridges and levees. The total volume of the lava field is about 5.4 cubic kilometres (1.3 cu mi) and it is often grouped together with Lastarria and South Spur as the Lastarria Volcanic Complex.

Neighbouring mountains include Chili volcano northeast, the 4,709-metre (15,449 ft) high Cerro Bayo northwest and the 5,214-metre (17,106 ft) high Cerro Piramide close to Negriales de Lastarria in the southwest. Almost due north of Lastarria lies the Laguna de la Azufrera, a salt pan with a waterbody that is almost a lake, its name is a reference to the sulfur deposits of Lastarria. There are hot springs with temperatures exceeding 40 °C (104 °F) on its eastern shore. The fumarolic system may drain into this waterbody, depositing sulfur at Azufrera's southern shore. Water levels in the lake were higher in the past, as evidenced by two recognizable shorelines, which owing to tectonics related to recent volcanism in the Corrida de Cori crop out mainly on the eastern side, and the lake's surface area reached 18 square kilometres (7 mi^{2}). There is a valley and a lake also at the southeastern foot of Lastarria.

=== Landslide scar ===
A major sector collapse occurred on Lastarria's southeastern flank, leaving a clearly defined north–south scarp in the volcano that opens to the east-southeast. The scarp reaches a maximum height of 120 metres (390 ft) and forms a semicircle just under 1 kilometre (0.62 mi) wide; the northern part is longer than the southern and the western part directly abuts the margin of the southernmost crater of Lastarria. The highest point of the scarp lies at an altitude of 5,575 metres (18,291 ft).

The debris avalanche deposit is 8 kilometres (5.0 mi) long and well preserved with landforms such as lobes, levees and hummocks. After exiting the collapse scar over its northern opening, it overrode an older scoria cone before coming to rest. The slide, bordered by levee-like structures reaching a height of 20 metres (66 ft), formed 500-metre (1,600 ft) wide and 40-metre (130 ft) high lobes. Unlike many debris avalanche deposits, the Lastarria debris avalanche lacks large blocks and has only a few hummocks. The velocity of the avalanche has been estimated to have been over 84 metres per second (280 ft/s), a fairly high velocity for a volcanic debris avalanche, while later research proposed a maximum speed of 58–75 metres per second (208–270 km/h). It is possible that air was entrained in the debris, which thus assumed properties similar to an ignimbrite. The collapse occurred without any preceding instability of the edifice.

The avalanche deposit consists mostly of loose material such as ash, lapilli, pumice, with only a few lithic blocks. This loose consistency may explain the lack of megablocks. Its total volume is about 0.091 cubic kilometres (0.022 cu mi), less than the volume of the Mount St. Helens and Socompa deposits. It is comparable to the volume of the landslide that the Ancash earthquake triggered on Huascarán in Peru in 1970, resulting in more than 20,000 fatalities. There is evidence of previous flank collapses at Lastarria and ongoing flank instability.

=== Internal structure ===
The internal structure of a volcano has been visualized with a technique known as seismic wave tomography. An inverted funnel-shaped low velocity anomaly with a width of 4 by 9 kilometres (2.5 by 5.6 mi) extends to a depth of 1 kilometre (0.62 mi) beneath the volcano and appears to be associated with areas of high fumarolic activity; it may be the hydrothermal system. An even stronger anomaly at depths of 3 to 6 kilometres (1.9 to 3.7 mi) may be the magma chamber of the volcano and an associated fluid-filled system. Magnetotelluric imaging showed structures similar to those revealed using seismic imaging.

== Geology ==
Off the western coast of South America, the Nazca Plate subducts beneath the South America Plate at a rate of 7–9 centimetres per year (2.8–3.5 in/year). Volcanism in the Andes occurs in four distinct regions: the Northern Volcanic Zone, the Central Volcanic Zone, the Southern Volcanic Zone, and the Austral Volcanic Zone. All but the last are geographically associated with the subduction of the Nazca Plate beneath the South American Plate; the Austral Volcanic Zone involves the subduction of the Antarctic Plate beneath the South American Plate. Magmatic processes important in the Central Andes include the partial melting of the subducting plate and its sediments and of mantle peridotite, and fractional crystallization of ascending magma in the crust.

The earliest volcanic activity on the west coast of South America goes back to the Jurassic, when the South Atlantic started to open. During the late Cenozoic, a volcanic chain was formed on top of Mesozoic and Paleozoic rocks and reached a width of 100 to 150 kilometres (62 to 93 mi) in the area of Lastarria. This volcanism began 25 million years ago, and the rocks are mostly acidic rocks.

=== Local ===
Lastarria and Cordón del Azufre form a group of volcanoes on the Altiplano, on the border between Chile and Argentina. They were active during the Quaternary. The Bayo volcano is sometimes considered part of this complex as well. Lastarria and Cordón del Azufre, together with some more local volcanic centres, may be part of a larger silicic volcanic complex that has not yet formed a caldera. This complex is characterized by a 500-metre (1,600 ft) high doming with a central depression. The large Los Colorados caldera lies south-southeast of Lastarria. Farther south lie volcanoes such as Wheelwright Caldera and Cerro Blanco, the last of which shows evidence of recent unrest.

Lastarria is located on a basement formed by andesite–dacite volcanic rocks in the form of ignimbrites, lava flows, and lava domes. They are of Miocene to Pleistocene age and are in turn underlaid by Paleozoic metamorphized volcanic and sedimentary rocks. The basement underneath Lastarria appears to have a different composition to that beneath Lascar. A major crustal lineament known as the Archibarca lineament intersects the main volcanic arc at Lastarria. Other volcanic centres such as Galán and ore deposits are also found on this lineament. The intersection between this lineament and the arc may act as a weakness zone that focuses the ascent of magma. Other lineaments in the region include the Imilac-Salina del Fraile and Pedernales-Arizaro faults of Miocene age.

=== Geologic record ===
The Altiplano started to form during the Eocene, when subduction of the Nazca Plate beneath the South American Plate caused compression along the plate margin. Strong volcanism and tectonic uplift occurred between 15 and 20 million years ago.

=== Composition ===
Lastarria is composed of rocks ranging from basalt over andesite to dacite, and the rocks define a potassium-rich suite characteristic of calc-alkaline magmas of the Central Volcanic Zone. The appearance of Lastarria lavas is porphyritic. Phenocrysts include plagioclase in andesite with smaller amounts of amphibole, biotite, clinopyroxene, and orthopyroxene. Apatite and zircon form accessory minerals. Dacites have similar composition but also contain hornblende. Olivine is found in the andesites and quartz in the dacites.

A number of alteration products are also present, some of which have been visualized by aerial imagery. Fumarole deposits contain encrustations and sublimates. They broadly consist of several components, mainly native sulfur, sulfates like anhydrite, baryte, gypsum and rhomboclase, borates like sassolite, oxides like quartz and less commonly sulfides like galena, orpiment and pyrite. Cristobalite and magnetite are found in high-temperature vents. These form multicoloured deposits, ranging from yellow-white over grey to yellow-orange and red.

The petrogenesis of Lastarria rocks, like those of other volcanoes in the Central Volcanic Zone, involves the prolonged interaction with crustal rocks in magma chambers as well as the fractionation of certain minerals. Enriched lower crust and upper mantle might also contribute. Finally, the mixing of magma chamber contents with new and more mafic magma shortly before each eruption played an important role in rock genesis. In the case of Lastarria, this mixing occurs in a stratified magma chamber, with active convection occurring between lighter and colder upper contents and hotter and denser lower contents. Some rocks display "banding" features, implicating the mixing of different magmas during their formation. Some chemical differences exist among the Negriales rocks, the Lastarria lavas, and the Lastarria pyroclastics. The Negriales rocks are the richest in silicon dioxide, and their trace element composition sharply diverges as well. The Negriales rocks may originate from parental magmas that are different from the main Lastarria magmas.

== Climate and vegetation ==
Lastarria has a montane climate characterized by extreme aridity as it is located at the intersection between the summer rain region of the Altiplano and the Atacama Desert. Temperatures of −24 °C (−11 °F) and precipitation of 20–50 millimetres per year (0.79–1.97 in/year) have been recorded on Lastarria, although the precipitation may be underestimated. Low bush vegetation exists in the area.

== Eruptive history ==
The South Spur edifice is the oldest structure found at Lastarria. The Negriales lava field formed later. The five craters of Lastarria proper formed in five different stages. An alternative view holds that Negriales formed before the South Spur, and that the main edifice formed in ten different stages. Block-and-ash flows, hot avalanches, lava domes, lava flows, and pyroclastic flows have all been involved in the activity of Lastarria. Most deposits on the northern slopes were erupted during the last two stages, with the exception of several exposures of the older stages on the northwestern flank and the western "pink pyroclastic flow" deposit. Overall, later and Holocene activity at Lastarria was highly explosive, unlike the more effusive earlier eruptions including the Negriales eruptions.

Potassium–argon dating of Lastarria has yielded ages of 600,000 ± 300,000 and less than 300,000 years ago. The older date refers to the Negriales lava field, which has also been dated at 400,000 – 116,000 ± 26,000 years ago. The South Spur is dated at 150,000 ± 50,000 years ago. The main edifice started forming 260,000 ± 20,000 years ago. One andesite lava flow was dated at 51,000 ± 13,000 years ago by argon–argon dating. There was then a lull in volcanic activity until the Holocene. Three ignimbrites were erupted during the Holocene between 4,850 ± 40 and 2,460 ± 40 years ago and were emplaced around the volcano, in particular north and west of the edifice.

Most of the volcano formed post-glacially. Holocene explosive eruptions were separated by intervals of about 2,390 - 1,660 years. Three ignimbrites were erupted during the Holocene between 4,850 ± 40 and 2,460 ± 40 years ago and were emplaced around the volcano, in particular north and west of the edifice. Three ignimbrites were erupted during the Holocene between 4,850 ± 40 and 2,460 ± 40 years ago and were emplaced around the volcano, in particular north and west of the edifice. The landslide also occurred during the Holocene, 7430 (+136,−156) years before present. The lava dome on the northernmost crater rim is the youngest vent of Lastarria. The youngest dated deposit is 2,460 ± 50/60 years old, but at least one younger pyroclastic flow is present.

No historical eruptions are known but earthquakes have been recorded at the volcano and new sulfur flows were observed in 2019. Noticeable thermal hotspots are visible from ASTER imagery and are associated with the fumarolic areas. Temperatures observed at the hotspots are around 6 °C (279 K). A potential of geothermal power at Lastarria was recognized already in 1974. It is considered Argentina's 9th most dangerous volcano out of 38.

=== Fumarolic activity ===
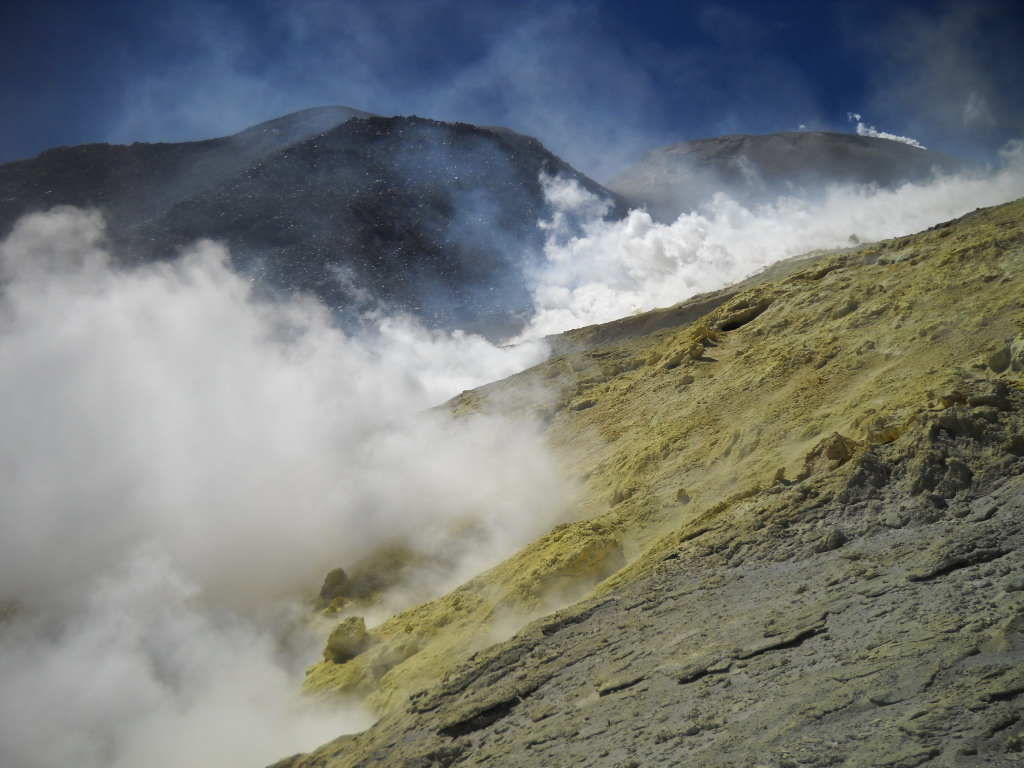
Vigorous fumarolic activity on the west slope of Lastarria. Note the yellow sulfur.

Lastarria displays vigorous fumarolic activity on the summit and down the northwestern slopes. Such activity has been observed since the European discovery of Lastarria, in the late 19th century. Lastarria is the only volcano in the area with ongoing fumarolic activity. It manifests in fumaroles forming 15-centimetre (5.9 in) high chimneys, small cones reaching heights of 2 metres (6 ft 7 in), 2.5 metres (8 ft 2 in) wide craters, 100 by 50 centimetres (39 by 20 in) fractures, in a diffuse fashion through pyroclastic deposits, as well as degassing through cracks and fissures on surfaces. Individual fumaroles have been found in the craters, on the crater edges, and on the slopes. A northwest–southeast striking fracture is associated with some of the fumaroles. Four different fumarole fields have been found, one along this fissure on the northwestern slope at altitudes of about 4,950 to 5,140 metres (16,240 to 16,860 ft), two on the rims of the fourth crater, and one in the fifth crater. The fissure field is the largest, covering a surface area of 0.023 square kilometres (0.0089 sq mi), while the other fields can be as small as 0.001 square kilometres (0.00039 sq mi). The alignment of fumarolic vents suggest that their position is controlled by the structure of the volcano. The fumarolic activity has led to the deposition of borates, sulfates, sulfides and sulfur on Lastarria. Fumarole fields have colours trending from grey to red to yellow-orange to pale yellow with decreasing temperatures, owing to different elements having different volatilities and depositing at different temperatures.

The fumaroles release gases with temperatures ranging from 80 to 408 °C (176 to 766 °F). Carbon dioxide is the most important non-hydrous component of the gases; other components are hydrogen in variable amounts, hydrogen chloride, hydrogen fluoride, hydrogen sulfide, and variable amounts of nitrogen and sulfur dioxide. Additional components are alkanes, alkenes, argon, carbon monoxide especially in hotter fumaroles, helium, methane especially in colder fumaroles, and oxygen. The composition of the fumaroles indicates that most gases are of magmatic origin with little contribution from the atmosphere. Likewise, most water comes from the magma rather than from precipitation, as indicated by the oxygen isotope ratios. It is likely that the arid climate of the region reduces the input of meteoric water to the volcanic system.

Of five volcanoes analyzed in 2012 (Lascar, Lastarria, Ollague, Putana, and San Pedro), Lastarria had the highest flux rates. Individual gas fluxes in tons per day are registered as:

Volcano	Carbon dioxide	Hydrogen bromide	Hydrogen chloride	Hydrogen fluoride	Hydrogen sulfide	Sulfur dioxide	Water
Lascar	534	0.15	199	9.4	30	554	5,192
Lastarria	973	0.6	385	5.8	174	884	11,059
Ollague						150	
Putana						68.5	
San Pedro						161	

The composition of Lastarria's gases has changed over time, with an increase in the magmatic component between 2009 and 2012, which may be due either to different measurement methods or to changes in the volcanic activity at Lastarria. Decreased temperatures have been observed after rainfall. Changes in the hydrothermally active areas have been observed in the 2010s-2020s.

The gases of Lastarria come from a geothermal system and, with temperatures ranging from 280 to 370 °C (536 to 698 °F) and 560 to 680 °C (1,040 to 1,256 °F), supply the colder and hotter fumaroles, respectively. In turn, a magma system at depths of 7 to 15 kilometres (4.3 to 9.3 mi) underpins and feeds this geothermal system. During their rise, the gases interact with the rocks of the surrounding country and with aquifers.

Lastarria's exhalations contain numerous volatile elements, like boron and chalcophiles. Arsenic is a harmful pollutant that occurs in above average concentrations in waters of northern Chile. Fumarolic exhalations at Lastarria can reach over 1 gram per kilogram (0.016 oz/lb) of the fumarole sediments and the volcano is considered to be an important source of arsenic of the southern Central Volcanic Zone.

==== Sulfur ====
The fumaroles on Lastarria have created widespread deposits of sulfur. The sulfur has also formed flows, of which the two largest are 350 metres (1,150 ft) and 250 metres (820 ft) long. The longer flow is partly buried by the shorter one and has already lost part of its surface structure. No vents have been found; sulfur flows appear to emerge from the fumarolic terrain. One andesite lava flow has generated several subsidiary sulfur flows that resemble pahoehoe flows and have widths of 1 to 2.5 metres (3 ft 3 in to 8 ft 2 in). It is likely that sulfur deposited by fumaroles formed such flows. Some fumaroles currently release centimetre-long sulfur flows. Flows of sulfur are highly fragile constructs that can easily be destroyed.

The conditions surrounding the emplacement of the sulfur have caused the sulfur to assume various colours, including black, brown-orange, orange, red, yellow, and yellow-orange. These colours vary along the length of the flows and between various flows, indicating that temperatures varied between one flow and another. Liquid sulfur has different viscosity and rheomorphic properties at different temperatures, and some variation occurred at Lastarria's flows as well.

Such sulfur flows are rare on Earth; they may be more common on the Jupiter moon Io. On Earth, they have been found at Kawah Ijen in Indonesia, Mount Iō (Shiretoko) in Japan, Mauna Loa on Hawaii, Momotombo in Nicaragua, and Sierra Negra on the Galapagos Islands. The sulfur flows on Lastarria may be threatened by future mining efforts in the region.

=== Ground uplift ===
InSAR observations performed in the years 1998 to 2000 have yielded evidence of a pattern of ground uplift centered between Lastarria and Cordón del Azufre. This pattern, also known as "Lazufre", covers a surface area of 45 by 37 kilometres (28 by 23 mi). This uplift appears to be caused by the injection of magma at depth, with a pattern of progressively increasing flux between 2003 and 2006. The source of this uplift appears to lie at depths of 9 to 17 kilometres (5.6 to 10.6 mi), later recalculated at 2 to 14 kilometres (1.2 to 8.7 mi). This uplift may have been ongoing for about 400,000 years and has influenced the final position of lava flows of Lastarria and other volcanoes in the area.

Ground uplift has been detected at Lastarria itself, amounting to 9 millimetres per year (0.35 in/year). The uplifting region has either a surface area of 6 square kilometres (2.3 sq mi) or is 6 kilometres (3.7 mi) wide, smaller than Lazufre. The Lastarria uplift started later than the Lazufre uplift and may be influenced by the latter. Possibly, magma injected into a Lazufre magma chamber is influencing the Lastarria hydrothermal system, with changes in fumarole output observed in 2006–2012. Modelling indicates that the source of this uplift lies at a depth of about 1,000 metres (3,300 ft) and has the shape of a sphere. Another estimate places the source inside the volcanic edifice and assumes a size of 230 to 360 metres (750 to 1,180 ft), with the volume increasing by about 8,000 to 18,000 cubic metres per year (280,000 to 640,000 ft^{3}/a).

Ground uplift is still underway but with a slowdown between 2006 and 2016. At other volcanoes, such uplift has been associated with changes in fumarolic activity or even the start of an eruption.

== Threats ==
The volcano is in a remote area and thus constitutes little risk to human settlements. The closest populations are at Mina Vaquillas, Mina El Guanaco, and Campamento Pajonales. The Chilean SERNAGEOMIN published a volcano alert rating for Lastarria. A permanent seismometer was installed on the volcano in late 2013. It is considered the 45th most dangerous volcano in Chile.

== See also ==
- Cerro Escorial
- Corrida de Cori
- List of volcanoes in Chile
- List of volcanoes in Argentina
