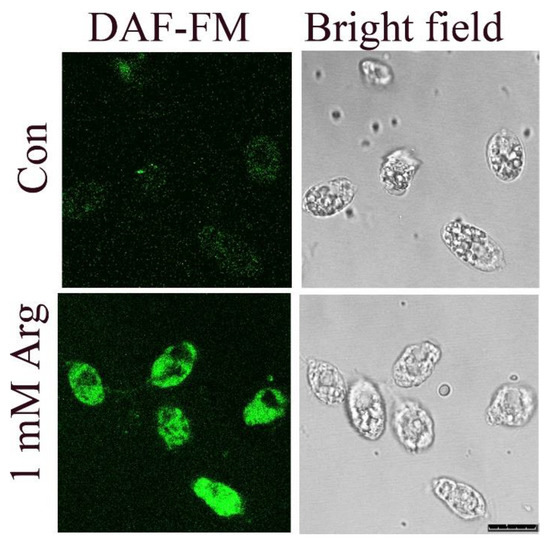

Scientific classification
- Clade: Viridiplantae
- Division: Chlorophyta
- Class: Chlorophyceae
- Order: Chlamydomonadales
- Family: Dunaliellaceae
- Genus: Polytomella
- Species: P. parva

Binomial name
- Polytomella parva E.G. Pringsheim

= Polytomella parva =

Species of alga

Polytomella parva is a species of colorless green algae of the genus Polytomella. It lacks a cell wall and contains two linear mitochondrial units of DNA.
