= Dunaliella parva =

Scientific classification
- Kingdom: Plantae
- Division: Chlorophyta
- Class: Chlorophyceae
- Order: Chlamydomonadales
- Family: Dunaliellaceae
- Genus: Dunaliella
- Species: D. parva

Binomial name
- Dunaliella parva W.Lerche, 1937

Species of alga

Dunaliella parva is a species of unicellular green algae in the family Dunaliellaceae. Its name is Latin for small or little. Like other Dunaliella species, it thrives in hypersaline environments and is carotenoid rich.
