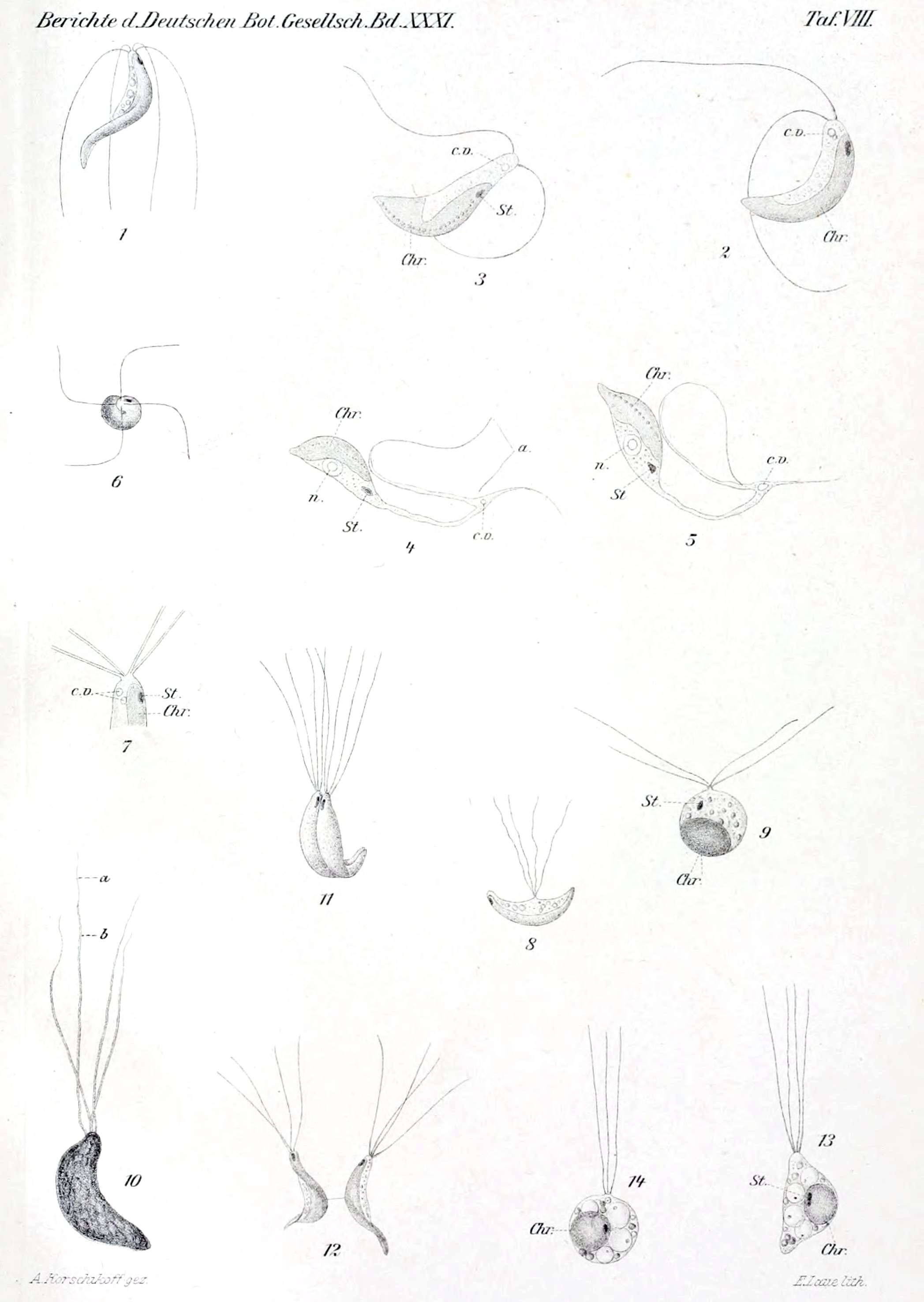
- Spermatozopsis exsultans

Scientific classification
- Kingdom: Plantae
- Division: Chlorophyta
- Class: Chlorophyceae
- Order: Chlamydomonadales
- Family: Dunaliellaceae
- Genus: Spermatozopsis; Korshikov, 1913

Type species
- Spermatozopsis exsultans Korshikov

Species
- Spermatozopsis exsultans; Spermatozopsis similis

= Spermatozopsis =

Genus of green algae in the class Chlorophyceae

Spermatozopsis is a genus of green algae in the class Chlorophyceae. It is found in freshwater habitats; it is widespread but not common.

Spermatozopsis consists of single, flagellated cells. Cells are 7–10(–12) μm wide long and 2–4 μm long, fusiform, curved (one side convex, the other side concave) and sometimes twisted. The anterior of the cell has two or four flagella, which are longer than the cell, with two contractile vacuoles near the base of the flagella. The cell has a single parietal chloroplast along the convex side of the cell with a stigma, lacking a pyrenoid. Asexual reproduction occurs by longitudinal binary fission.

Spermatozopsis swims with in a spiral motion, with its anterior in the front and its flagella oriented backwards. Cells can also jerk backwards by pushing their flagella forwards.

Spermatozopsis is able to produce microbial cysts, which are globose with several parietal chloroplasts. Motile cells are able to withstand temperatures as high as 35 °C, and cysts can withstand dry heat; these traits likely help Spermatozopsis survive in aquatic environments. It serves as prey for dinoflagellate species.

The phylogenetic position of Spermatozopsis is unclear. Although it is traditionally a member of Dunaliellaceae based on morphology, phylogenomic studies place Spermatozopsis as either within Chlamydomonadales/Volvocales or as basal to the rest of Sphaeropleales.

== Species ==
Two species are known. The first is Spermatozopsis exsultans, which has four flagella of equal length (occasionally two or eight during division stages). The second is Spermatozopsis similis, which has two subequal flagella. A third species was discovered and named Spermatozopsis acidophila, but because of its morphological and ultrastructural differences (such as possessing a pyrenoid), it was transferred to the genus Dunaliella.
