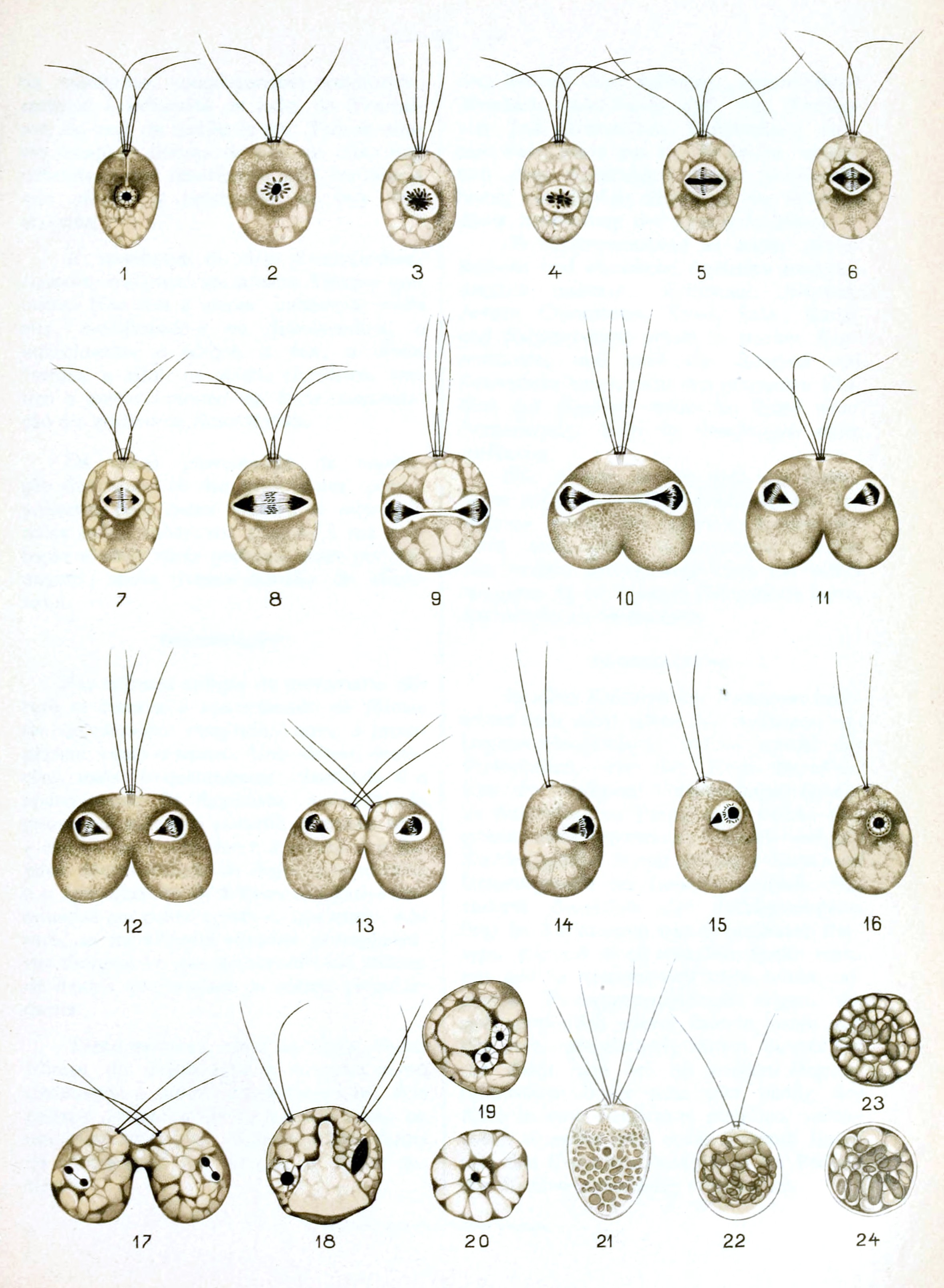
- Polytomella agilis

Scientific classification
- Kingdom: Plantae
- Division: Chlorophyta
- Class: Chlorophyceae
- Order: Chlamydomonadales
- Family: Dunaliellaceae
- Genus: Polytomella; Aragão

Species
- Polytomella agilis; Polytomella caeca; Polytomella capuana; Polytomella magna; Polytomella papillata; Polytomella parva

= Polytomella =

Genus of algae

Polytomella is a genus of green algae in the family Dunaliellaceae. It is widespread in freshwater habitats worldwide. The algae is actually colourless. It has discarded the ability of photosynthesis, and lives by consuming compounds like acetate, butyrate, and alcohols. Thus, it's one of the rare examples of non-photosynthetic algae.

Polytomella consists of single, cells that lack cell walls. Cells are ellipsoid, pyriform, or globose, and slightly metabolic (flexible). Cells have four anterior flagella arising from a central papilla. The posterior of the cell is usually rounded, rarely pointed or with spine-like extensions. Although classified as an alga, chloroplasts and pyrenoids are absent and cells instead have vestigial leucoplasts. The cell accumulates starch in its cytoplasm. A single stigma and two to four apical contractile vacuoles are typically present. The single nucleus is located in the central or anterior half of the cell.

Asexual reproduction occurs by longitudinal, binary division; sexual reproduction is isogamous with the zygotes giving rise to four motile cells.

Polytomella is somewhat similar to Tetrablepharis, another colorless alga with four flagella, but Tetrablepharis has cell walls. Species are distinguished based on morphological characters such as the presence or absence of a papilla, shape of the cells, and position of intracellular features like starch granules.

== Evolution ==
Polytomella is a free-living, flagellated, nonphotosynthetic green alga with a highly reduced, linear fragmented mitochondrial genome. Plastids are still present, but the plastid genome and all associated gene expression machinery has been completely lost. Having transitioned completely to heterotrophy, Polytomella uses organic acids, alcohols and monosaccharides as its carbon source.
