= Hafniomonas =

Scientific classification
- Kingdom: Plantae
- Division: Chlorophyta
- Class: Chlorophyceae
- Order: Chlamydomonadales
- Family: Dunaliellaceae
- Genus: Hafniomonas; Ettl & Moestrup

Species
- Hafniomonas conica; Hafniomonas montana; Hafniomonas reticulata; Hafniomonas turbinea

Genus of algae

Hafniomonas is a genus of green algae in the family Dunaliellaceae. It is found in freshwater.

Hafniomonas is a unicellular, flagellate alga. Cells are elongate, ovoid, pyriform or cylindrical or globose-cordate; they are typically somewhat four-sided in cross section, with the anterior end bearing four longitudinal, rounded ridges. At the center of the anterior end emerge four flagella, sometimes with a small papilla. The cell contains a single nucleus, two contractile vacuoles, and one cup-shaped, parietal chloroplast and a distinct stigma and pyrenoid. The chloroplast may be perforate, separated into segments.

Asexual reproduction occurs via cell division, and sometimes cells form cysts or palmelloid stages. Sexual reproduction is unknown.

Hafniomonas consists of species that were formerly classified within Pyramimonas. Unlike Pyramimonas, Hafniomonas lacks cell walls and a covering of scales. Hafniomonas has chloroplasts with are not markedly lobed, unlike Pyramimonas which has chloroplasts which are markedly lobed into four, eight or 12 lobes in the anterior. Within Hafniomonas, species are distinguished based on the position of the pyrenoid, form of the chloroplast and stigma, and shape and size of cells.
