= Cordón del Azufre =

Mountain in Argentina

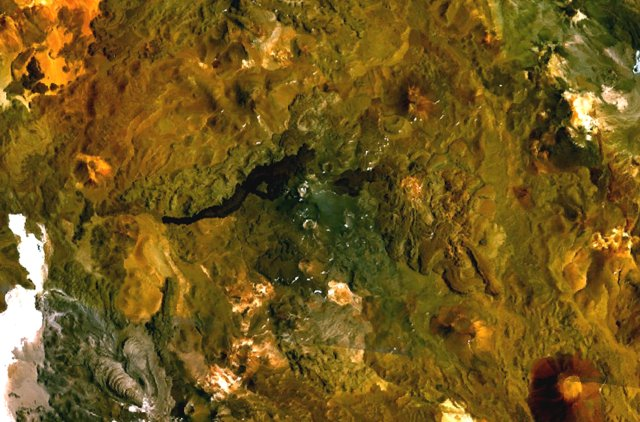
- NASA Landsat composite image

Highest point
- Elevation: 5,481 m (17,982 ft)
- Coordinates: 25°20′S 68°31′W

Geography
- Location: Argentina, Chile
- Parent range: Andes

Geology
- Rock age: 0.3 ± 0.3 mya
- Mountain type: Complex volcano
- Last eruption: Unknown

Cordón del Azufre is an inactive complex volcano located in the Central Andes, at the border of Argentina and Chile. It consists of three stages of volcanic cones and associated lava flows, and its activity is a consequence of the subduction of the Nazca Plate underneath the South American Plate. North of it are the dormant volcano Lastarria and the actively uplifting Lazufre region.

== Geography and geology ==
The volcano, which is sometimes conflated with Lastarria, lies at the border between Argentina and Chile and contains a series of lava flows and volcanic craters and lava flows, covering a surface area of 60 square kilometres (23 sq mi). Four craters are aligned in a north–south direction on a 5-kilometre-long (3.1 mi) ridge, which could reflect a north-south trending lineament. Numerous monogenetic volcanoes and stratovolcanoes developed on it and buried most of its central crater under lava flows. A pile of lava flows covers an area of 25 square kilometres (9.7 sq mi) on the eastern side. The eastern component is formed by lava flows and craters in Argentina, and the youngest part la Moyra volcano in the western component generated a lava flow that advanced 6 kilometres (3.7 mi) westwards and another that ran 3 kilometres (1.9 mi) to the east. To the north lie the Plio-Pleistocene Atalaya volcano, followed by the Quaternary Azufre Oriental and Lastarria volcanoes, to the south the Plio-Pleistocene Chuta, the Quaternary Cerro Bayo Complex and the Los Colorados caldera. The area is uninhabited and remote, the climate arid, windy and with high temperature variations.

Cordón del Azufre is located 300 kilometres (190 mi) east of the Chile Trench, where the subduction takes place. At this latitude, the volcanic arc intersects a probably deep-seated structural area named the Archibarca corridor. Around Cordón del Azufre is a more local-scale raised region, as has been observed for some other CVZ volcanoes. The landscape is largely devoid of through-going drainages, as the extreme dryness and the frequent blockages by lava flows prevent its development.

=== Regional context and composition ===
Off the western coast of South America, the Nazca Plate subducts beneath the South American Plate. This subduction is responsible for volcanism in the Andean Volcanic Belt, including the Northern Volcanic Zone, the Central Volcanic Zone (CVZ), the Southern Volcanic Zone and the Austral Volcanic Zone. The CVZ extends over Peru, Bolivia, Chile and Argentina. Volcanic manifestations in the Central Andes include the numerous calderas and associated ignimbrites that form the Altiplano-Puna volcanic complex, such as La Pacana and Galán. There are about forty Quaternary volcanoes around Cordón del Azufre, which formed on top of Tertiary volcanic rocks. The region has grown to a high elevation since the Eocene. Basement rocks are Paleozoic volcanic and sedimentary rocks, and the large Pedernales-Arizaro thrust fault runs close to Cordón del Azufre.

Volcanic rocks include andesite and dacite with a porphyritic appearance and hornblende and plagioclase inclusions. The rocks formed through interactions of ascending basaltic andesite with crustal material. The volcano is noted for its sulfur deposits, and the source of sulfur in Salar de Gorbea.

== Eruption history ==
Volcanic rocks at Cordón del Azufre are less than one million years old. Activity has moved over time from the north-south craters to the eastern lava flows and vents and eventually to La Moyra. Lava flows of the eastern component have been dated to be 600,000 years old. No activity, including fumarolic activity, has been recorded at Cordón del Azufre, but the appearance (dark and pristine) and radiometric age (0.3 ± 0.3 mya K-Ar on the most recent flow) of the lava flows suggest a recent age with Holocene activity. Pyroclastic deposits are linked to the youngest cone may date to a historical eruption. Renewed activity would likely consist of lava flows and pyroclastic deposits and, in light of the total lack of important roads and habitation, potential future eruptions are no threat. It is considered the 21st most dangerous volcano out of 38 in Argentina.

Beginning in 1996-1998, an elliptic area of 2,000 square kilometres (770 sq mi) has been uplifting. The centre of the uplifting area is between the volcanoes Lastarria and Cordón del Azufre, and has been named "Lazufre" after the acronym, but Cerro Bayo Gorbea is sometimes included in it. Lastarria, Cordón del Azufre and Cerro Bayo Gorbea form linear fissures that emanate from the centre of the Lazufre uplift, which is surrounded by a ring of Quaternary volcanoes and may be a developing caldera. The start of the uplift may be related to the occurrence of several tectonic earthquakes in the 1990s, such as the 1995 Antofagasta earthquake. They could have perturbed the magma chambers or opened up fractures. Magma influx has been stable as of 2009.

This deformation system is among the largest on Earth, comparable with the size of calderas such as Long Valley and Yellowstone. There are several Pleistocene volcanoes around the uplift region, which may be supplied from the sill. Magnetotelluric data show a zone with high electrical conductivity that rises from the mantle into the crust, and may be the magma supply to Lazufre. Research published in 2016 indicated that the uplift has been ongoing since at least 400,000 years, based on the deformation of lava flows and volcanoes erupted within this time period. Depending on the highly uncertain estimates for the volume of the magma chamber, a modest overpressure may be sufficient to cause the roof of the chamber to fail and an eruption to start.

== See also ==
- List of volcanoes in Chile
- List of volcanoes in Argentina
- Los Colorados (caldera)
