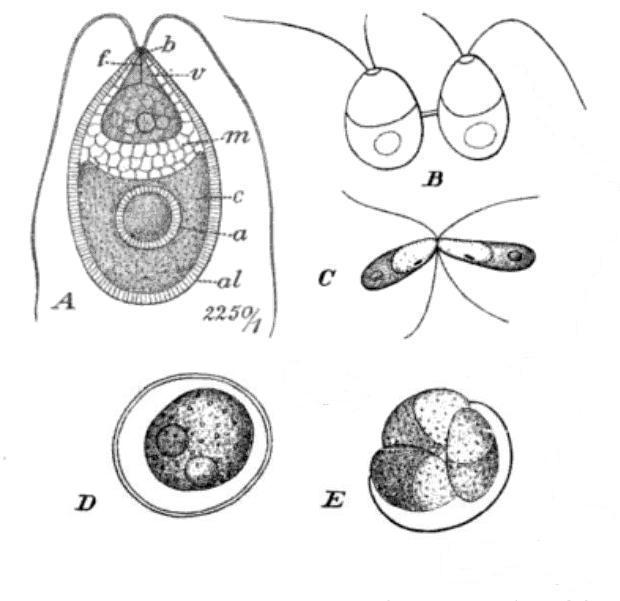
- Dunaliella salina Teodor. A: Vegetative cell, B: Zoospores in cell division, C: Mating gametes, D: Ripe zygospore, E: Zygospore germination
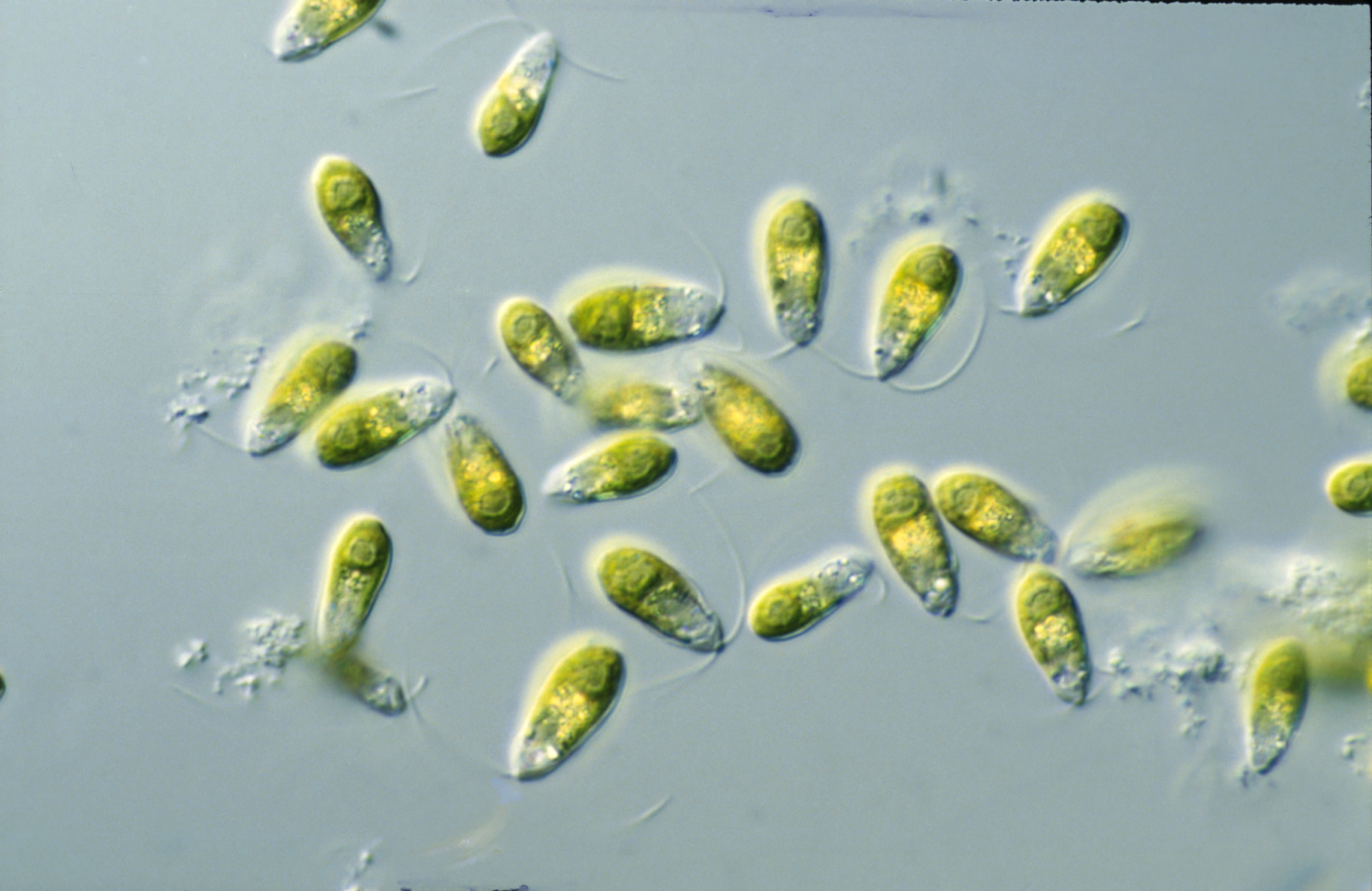

Scientific classification
- Kingdom: Plantae
- Division: Chlorophyta
- Class: Chlorophyceae
- Order: Chlamydomonadales
- Family: Dunaliellaceae
- Genus: Dunaliella; Teodoresco

Type species
- Dunaliella salina Teodoresco (Dunal)

Species
- Dunaliella acidophila Dunaliella asymmetrica Dunaliella baas Dunaliella bardawil Dunaliella bioculata Dunaliella carpatica Dunaliella gracilis Dunaliella granulata Dunaliella jacobae Dunaliella lateralis Dunaliella maritima Dunaliella media Dunaliella minuta Dunaliella minutissima Dunaliella parva Dunaliella peircei Dunaliella polymorpha Dunaliella primolecta Dunaliella pseudosalina Dunaliella quartolecta Dunaliella ruineniana Dunaliella salina Dunaliella terricola Dunaliella tertiolecta Dunaliella turcomanica Dunaliella viridis

= Dunaliella =

Genus of algae

Dunaliella is a genus of single-celled, photosynthetic green algae, that is characteristic for its ability to thrive and outcompete other organisms in hypersaline environments. They are mostly marine organisms, though there are a few freshwater species that tend to be more rare. It is a genus in which certain species can accumulate relatively large amounts of β-carotenoids and glycerol in very harsh growth conditions, consisting of high light intensities, high salt concentrations, and limited oxygen and nitrogen levels, yet is still very abundant in lakes and lagoons all around the world.

It becomes very complicated to distinguish and interpret species of this genus on simply a morphological and physiological level due to the organism's lack of cell wall that allows it to have malleability and change shape and its different pigments that allows it to change colours depending on the environmental conditions. Molecular phylogeny analysis has become a critical protocol in discovering the taxonomy of Dunaliella. The genus has been studied for over a hundred years, becoming a critical model organism for studying algal salt adaptation processes. It has remained relevant due to its numerous biotechnological applications, including β-carotenoid cosmetic and food products, medicine, and biofuel research.

Dunaliella tertiolecta, swimming under a microscope.

== History of knowledge ==
Dunaliella was originally called Haematococcus salinus by the French botanist Michel Félix Dunal, who first sighted the organism in 1838 in saltern evaporation ponds in Montpellier, France. However, when the organism was officially described and labelled as a new and distinct genus in 1905 Bucharest, Romania by Emanoil C. Teodorescu, the name was changed to Dunaliella in honour of the original discoverer. To describe the genus, Teodoresco studied live samples from Romanian salt lakes and noted details like colours, movement, and general morphologies.

The genus was also described by another biologist in 1905 named Clara Hamburger in Heidelberg, Germany, but Teodoresco's paper was published first while she was in the final stages of her own article's production. Hamburger's description was more thorough since she studied material imported from Cagliari Sardinia and was able to study live as well as dead material and could create sections to view inner cell contents and also described different life stages.

Since then, various other studies on Dunaliella have been performed. Notable ones include Cavara's article in 1906 expanding on the Cagliari, Sardinia saltern study by Hamburger, Peirce's article in 1914 on Dunaliella in the Salton Sea, California, Labbé's various ecological studies of the algae in salterns of Le Croisic, France, Becking et al.'s studies on Dunaliella organisms from all over the world, and in-depth taxonomic studies by Hamel and Lerche.

In 1906, Teodoresco described two species named Dunaliella salina and Dunaliella viridis. The distinct classifications came from D. salina being notably bigger in size and being red in colour due to large amounts of carotenoid pigments. D. viridis was described as smaller as well as green in colour. These descriptions were extensively challenged by other biologists such as Hamburger and Blanchard, who insisted that they were not different species, but simply different life stages with the green cells being the juvenile form .

Then, in 1921, Labbé performed a study in which he placed samples of Dunaliella from saltern brines into a lower salinity environment and observed that the organisms adapted to the new conditions of the fresh water and lost their brown-red pigment and became greener – meaning that the red colour must have originated through very euryhaline chlorophyll-filled cells changing to a red colour in extremely saline conditions after permanently damaging their chlorophyll pigments. It is now known that there are actually very few Dunaliella species that can accumulate β-carotenoids and those that do, do so only under high light intensity, high salinity, and limited nutrient growth conditions. Cells then can revert to a yellow to green colour when environmental conditions become less harsh .

Through even more in-depth studies by Lerche et al., we now know that D. viridis is actually a heterogenous group and can be split into different species such as D. minuta, D. parva, D. media, and D. euchlora, though these groups are often grouped into one and called D. viridis. D. salina is now recognised as a distinct species and could soon become a very important one for biotechnological applications.

Various molecular studies have been performed on Dunaliella since 1999 to characterise its exact phylogeny. It has become apparent, though hardly confirmed, that there have been many misnamed cultures and synonymous species labelling in the genus that has yet to be worked out through molecular taxonomic research.

== Habitat and ecology ==
Halophilic Dunaliella species such as D. salina are notable for living all around the world in hypersaline environments such as salterns, salt lakes, and crystallisation ponds, with one unique subaerial species found growing on top of spider webs covering the walls of a cave in the Coastal Range of the Atacama Desert. Some of these are at lower salt concentration (~0.05M,) and some are at, or very close to, the saturation levels of NaCl (~5.5M). Its ability to flourish in such a wide range of salt concentrations allows it outcompete most other organisms in its habitat, since their tolerances are often not as high. Though the genus and its species have been studied for over a hundred years, very little is known about their exact ecological dynamic with specific environmental conditions and with other organisms. They are mostly marine, however there are few freshwater species of Dunaliella that have even less information on them in terms of ecology. It is known, however, that in hypersaline ecosystems, Dunaliella is a critical primary producer that allows other organisms, such as filter feeders and a variety of planktonic organisms, to sustain themselves. The organisms can depend almost completely or wholly on the carbon that the photosynthetic alga fixes. Notably, it is important food for the brine plankton Artemia, so much so that increases in Artemia populations often correlate with decreases in Dunaliella populations.

In the Great Salt Lake, Dunaliella is a very relevant organism, particularly in the north arm where it is the main or possibly sole primary producer, and in the south arm where it is a significant component of the phototrophic community.

In the 1970s, Dunaliella dominated the north arm planktonic community, since the waters were too salty for other algae to thrive. The organisms were horizontally and rather randomly distributed on the surface, especially in places with minimal sunlight such as underneath rocks and logs. They were found in densities of 200–1000 cells/ml and sometimes in peak densities of 3000–10000 cells/ml. At times they were even found to be more abundant at deeper depths, though little is known on whether this was due to intolerable light intensities at the surface. Even in the less saline south arm, Dunaliella was responsible for various short-lived blooms with up to 25000 cells/ml. Unfortunately, populations in both arms went into decline after periods of increased precipitations that decreased the Great Salt Lake's salinity. Dunaliella started to become outcompeted by other phototrophs like the cyanobacterium Nodularia.

It has been reported that in the winter months, when temperatures reach 0 °C, there is a large accumulation of round cyst-like cells that deposit themselves on the bottom of the Great Salt Lake. This encysting property of Dunaliella must have been critical for its survival in the Dead Sea, where salt concentrations have risen to intolerable amounts, such that the organism cannot be found in the water column today. In remote sensing, however, they found that when they diluted the upper waters, Dunaliella showed up; perhaps emerging from the shallow sediments where they had encysted. Back when the alga was found in the water column, however, population rate monitoring revealed that Dunaliella growth was inhibited by high concentrations of magnesium and calcium ions. Dunaliella blooms can therefore only occur in the Dead Sea when the waters become sufficiently diluted by winter rains and when the limiting nutrient phosphate is available.

Dunaliella species, especially D. salina, is responsible and quite famous for turning lakes and lagoons into pink and red colours such as the Pink Lake in Australia. The hypersaline environments are dominated by β-carotenoid pigments and show up quite distinctly.

== Morphology and cellular processes ==
Dunaliella is a biflagellate green algal and mostly marine protist that, in its vegetative motile form and depending on the species, exhibits ellipsoid, ovoid, and cylindrical shapes that sometimes taper at the posterior end. It can also exhibit more circular shapes in its vegetative non-motile cyst state. The cells are typically 7–12 μm in length, though there are few species larger or smaller than this. D. salina, for instance is larger in size, typically ranging from 16–24 μm. Sizes of the cells vary with environmental conditions such as light, salinity, and nutrient availability.

Their two equal-length apical flagella are about 1.5X – 2X the length of the cell and beat rapidly, pulling the cell forward to cause abrupt turning motions and rotations along the longitudinal axis. The basal bodies of the flagella are interconnected by a distal fibre that is bilaterally cross-striated. In freshwater species, two contractile vacuoles are present near the base of the flagella.

The morphology of Dunaliella is very similar to that of Chlamydomonas, however it can be distinguished through its lack of cell wall and contractile vacuoles (in some species). Instead of a rigid cell wall, the plasmalemma of Dunaliella has a notable thick, mucilaginous coating. Olivera et al. noticed that the cell coating was affected by proteolytic enzymes and neuraminidase and concluded that its makeup must be mostly glycoprotein with some neuraminic acid residues. Instead of contractile vacuoles, marine species of Dunaliella replace the organelle's usual spot in most other Chlorophyceae cells, with two to three dictyosomes that lie in a characteristic parabasal position with their forming faces toward the plasmalemma and ER.

Dunaliella cells contain a large, cup-shaped plastid that takes up the majority of the cell. Its large pyrenoid, which sits in the centre of the chloroplast, is another defining feature that is the same in all Dunaliella species. It is covered by a starch shell with numerous starch grains and pairs of thylakoids entering but not going completely through the pyrenoid exterior into its matrix. Starch grains are also scattered all throughout the chloroplast. Depending on how high the light intensities and salt concentrations are, the thylakoids can form stacks with up to ten units. Within the thylakoid membranes, β-carotenoids can accumulate, especially in high salinity and light intensity conditions, in oil globules. The pigments are made of neutral lipids and give the green alga its orange to red to brown colouration. The accumulation of β-carotenoids serves to protect the cells in high light intensity environments by absorbing and dissipating excess light better than chlorophyll can. In milder conditions, chlorophyll pigments make the cells look yellow to green. The chloroplast of Dunaliella also has an eyespot that sits at an anterior peripheral position and is made of one to two rows of lipids.

The reason Dunaliella is able to be so halotolerant is due to its very effective osmoregulatory process. Firstly, the lack of cell wall allows the cell to easily expand and contract to maintain liveable internal salt concentrations. Secondly, when triggered by the changes in cell volumes and in levels of inorganic phosphate and pH following osmotic shock, plasma membrane sensors and various soluble metabolites activate glycerol synthesis. Either produced via photosynthesis or starch degradation, intracellular glycerol allows the cells to adapt to the high osmotic stress by counterbalancing the external and pressures and thus, preventing cell swelling.

Freshwater species of Dunaliella are much more rare and thus, less studied. Their descriptions have hardly changed since their original publications and various ones are still being debated for whether they warrant the classification as Dunaliella due to certain species having differently placed pyrenoids, missing eye spots, unusual cell division, etc.

The nucleus of Dunaliella lies more or less centrally in the anterior part of the cell and has a defined nucleolus. Lipid droplets and vacuoles lie around it, obscuring it and making it difficult to observe.

== Life cycle ==
When conditions are unfavourable due to prolonged dryness or exposure to low salinity waters, Dunaliella cells undergo sexual reproduction. Two haploid vegetative motile cells will touch flagella and then fuse their equal-sized gametes with one another in a very similar way to Chlamydomonas by the formation of a cytoplasmic bridge. After this isogamous fertilisation, the diploid zygote, which is red and/or green in colour, develops a thick and smooth wall and takes on a circular shape very similar to the cyst form of Dunaliella. In fact, after observing zygotes, there was discussion on whether the cysts seen after and algal bloom at the Dead Sea in 1992 were in fact, zygotes. The wall of the zygote will serve to protect the cell during a resting period in the harsh conditions until finally, the zygote will undergo meiosis and release up to 32 haploid daughter cells via a tear in the cellular envelope. Asexual resting cysts may be a possibility, though has not been studied enough to confirm.

In its vegetative motile state, cells divide through mitosis as haploids through longitudinal fission. In the chloroplast, the pyrenoid actually starts dividing first during preprophase and then the entire chloroplast finally divides during cytokinesis.

== Genetic approach ==
In the past, species descriptions and definitions have arisen through physiological characteristics like halotolerance and morphological characteristics like β-carotene content. However, this has led to numerous misidentifications, especially in marine species, since different conditions changing cell volumes, shapes, and colours make it very difficult to decide what organism is different to another. Since 1999, molecular analysis is used as the primary tool in Dunalliela identification due to its ability to analyze data independent of environmental factors ^{11}. To identify species, the 18S rRNA gene, Internal transcribed spacer region (ITS), and ribulose-bisphosphate carboxylase (RuBisCO) gene are being used. Renaming has already been done for several species, though it is an on-going process to create a reliable and accurate taxonomic system.

== Practical importance ==
Economically, Dunaliella, particularly D. salina and D. bardawil, serves great value due to its high accumulation of β-carotenoids. The pigment is exploited for a variety of uses such as cosmetics, natural food-colouring agents, nutritional supplements, and animal feed. It is also used for treating harmful wastewater plants through adsorbing, sequestering, and metabolisation of heavy metal ions. Its biotechnological potential has long been exploited ever since it was found that certain species can have up 16% of their dry-weight being composed of β-carotenoids, and that lakes and lagoons that turn pink or red, contain very high populations of D. salina that make up as much as 13.8% of the dry organic matter – such as in Pink Lake, Victoria, Australia.

Dunaliella also serves as a very important model organism in understanding how algae adapts to and regulates itself in different salt concentrations. In fact, the idea for developing solutes to maintain osmotic balance in other organic matter originated from the osmoregulatory abilities of Dunaliella.

D. salina and D. bardawil are also widely studied and currently used in biopharmaceuticals. An example includes nuclear transformations that led to the production HBsAg protein. This protein has significant epidemiologic importance to the hepatitis B virus as well as the potential of being carrier of epitopes for many other pathogens. Dunaliella is also used in the context of medicine for asthma, eczema, cataracts, and even cancer.

On top of its involvement in the consumer, food, and health industries, Dunaliella is also becoming very useful in biofuel research. D. salina in particular can accumulate very high amounts of starches and lipids under stressful conditions; both of which are very critical in creating successful biofuels. Since other genera of green algae have complications in growth effectiveness under stressful conditions such as hypersaline environments, D. salina serves as very helpful organism for researching optimal stress levels for optimal biomass production conditions.
