= Emanoil C. Teodorescu =

Romanian botanist

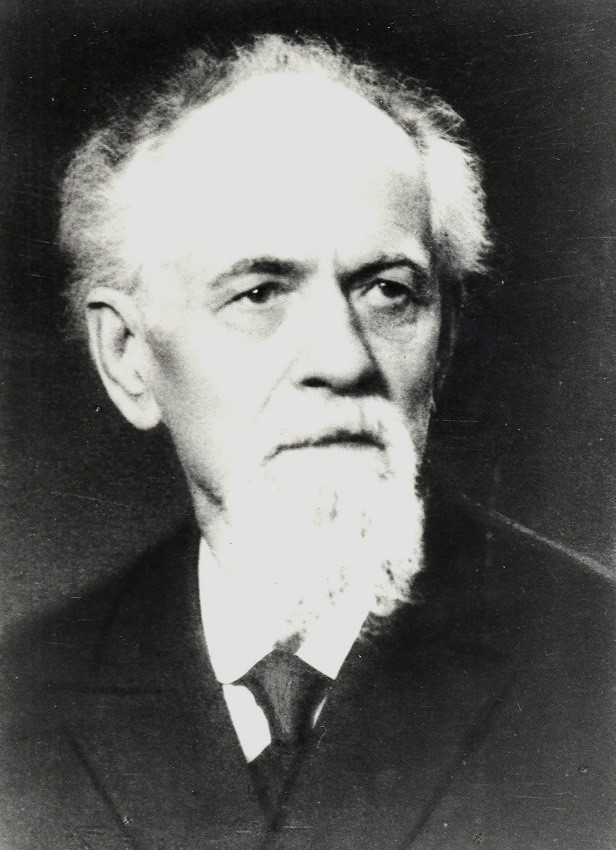
Emanoil C. Teodorescu

Emanoil Constantin Teodorescu (May 10, 1866–1949) was a Romanian botanist.

He was elected a titular member of the Romanian Academy in 1949. The standard author abbreviation Teodor. is used to indicate this person as the author when citing a botanical name.
