= Corrida de Cori =

Mountain range in Argentina and Chile

Coordinates: 25°06′S 68°20′W

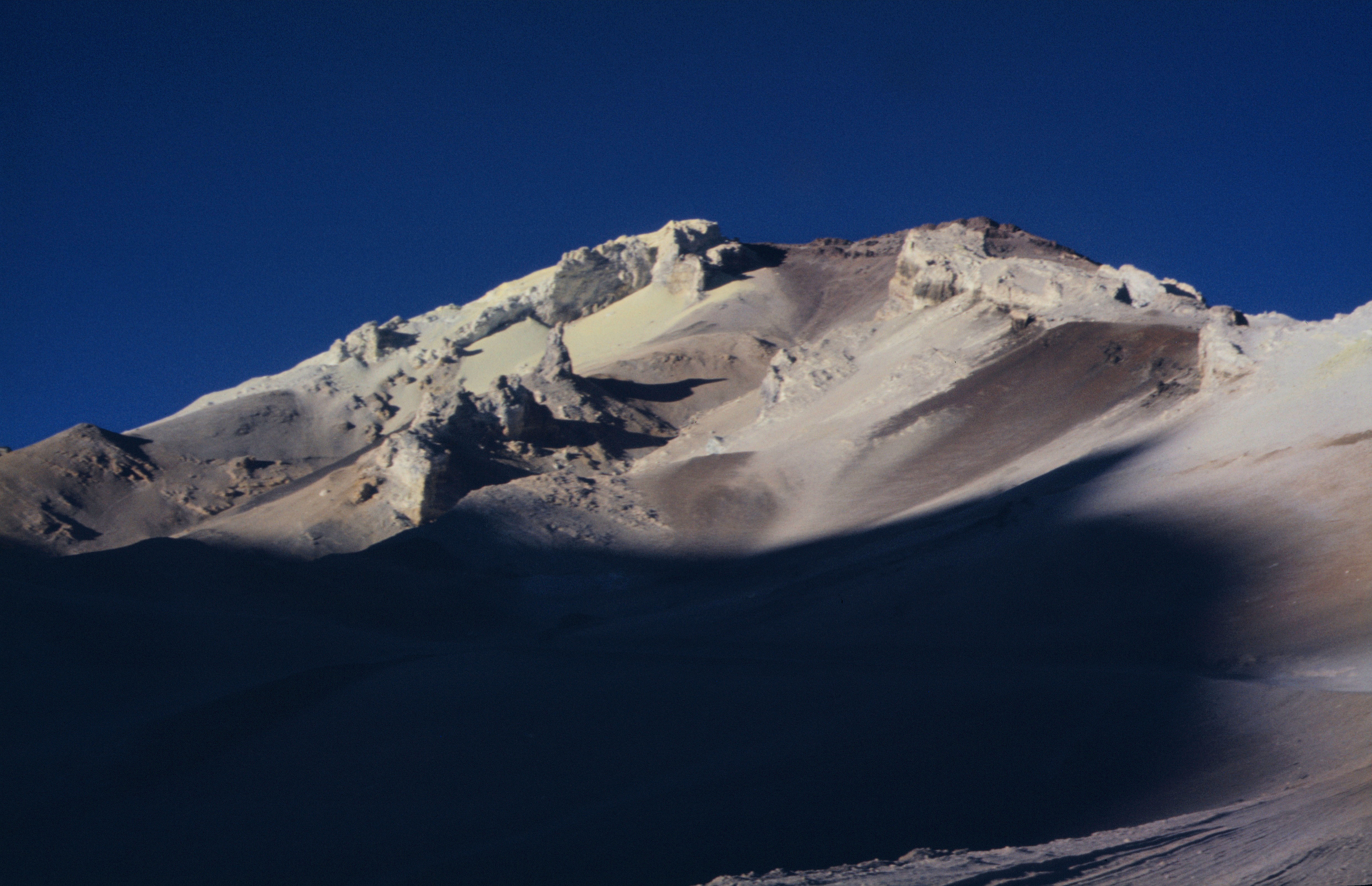
Cerro Escorial summit area

Corrida de Cori is a mountain range in Argentina and Chile. It consists of several aligned volcanoes, including Cerro Escorial, which exceed 5 kilometres (3.1 mi) in elevation. The range, together with several local volcanoes, forms an alignment that may be controlled by a fault system. The volcanoes erupted mainly andesite and basaltic andesite, they were active in the Plio-Pleistocene with the most recent activity occurring at Cerro Escorial and at a cinder cone east of the range. There are two mines in the area, with a weather station nearby.

== Geography and geomorphology ==
Corrida de Cori a range of Plio-Pleistocene volcanoes of small to medium dimensions. It is located in the Puna of South America, Salta province of Argentina and the Antofagasta Region of Chile. The boundary between the two countries was defined to run over this mountain range and a number of border incidents relative to Argentina exploiting sulfur deposits in Chilean territory occurred in the mid-20th century.

Cerro Escorial is part of this range, Cerro Negro (5,579 metres (18,304 ft)) and Cerro Corrida de Cori (c. 5,400 metres (17,700 ft)) are other summits, Lastarria may also be linked. The Cerro Negro-Corrida de Cori chain and Cerro Escorial sectors run in north-northwest to south-southeast direction along the Argentina–Chile border. South-southeast of Cerro Escorial the chain continues southeastward into Argentina. Some glacial activity in the area has degraded volcanic landforms, but very little erosion is evident and on the Argentine side well-preserved lava flows are evidence.

It forms a volcanic chain with Llullaillaco that extends towards Antofalla and Galán. This lineament is known as "Archibarca lineament". Cerro Corrida de Cori and Cerro Negro are associated with the intersections between this lineament and east-northeast trending lineaments. Fault zones on the area have controlled the rise of magma to the surface, probably facilitating the eruption of basaltic lavas. Among these faults is the Imilac–Salina del Fraile lineament.

== Geological history ==
The Puna began to develop 15–20 mya and continued to contract until 1–2 mya. Activity commenced in the Miocene with basaltic andesites and dacitic ignimbrites and ended in the late Quaternary with basaltic andesites in form of cinder cones. K-Ar dates of 12 mya and 8.0 ± 0.3 have been found at Cerro Negro.

A major ignimbrite is found in the Escorial area and extends in a butterfly shape over 105 square kilometres (41 sq mi) with a thickness of c. 6 metres (20 ft). Probably erupted from Cerro Escorial, it extends 10 kilometres (6.2 mi) away from Escorial. It has a total volume of c. 0.6 cubic kilometres (0.14 cu mi) and consists of crystal rich dacite with large amounts of xenoliths. Where the ignimbrite was dammed by older lava flows, it formed internal wave structures. The surface of the ignimbrite is grooved and rippled in appearance and is heavily influenced by aeolian (wind-driven landscape changes) activity. Dating is uncertain, with older dates including 1.3 ± 0.6 mya but a more precise recent date is 0.457 ± 0.013 mya. This ignimbrite was likely formed by a column collapse and is known as the Caletones Cori, Escorial or Corrida de Cori Ignimbrite. Another ignimbrite is the La Casualidad Ignimbrite, it was erupted about 1.2 million years ago at Cerro Escorial.

Lava flows found on Escorial and Cerro Corrida de Cori are the latest volcanic events and post-date the hydrothermal alteration; one date from Escorial is 0.342 ± 0.025 mya. Most Escorial lava flows head southwest. These flows are accompanied by andesitic blocks from possibly Vulcanian explosive activity. East of Corrida de Cori range a cinder cone accompanied by a much smaller vent was constructed on top of older eruption products and generated a lava flow that descended towards Salar Rio Grande. This cone may be of Holocene age, considering the appearance of the blockly lava flows. Present day geothermal activity is found at Lastarria and in form of fumarole spires, mud vents and warm springs at Escorial. Some of these originate by the summit lava flow of Cerro Escorial.

== Rocks and minerals ==
Corrida de Cori volcanism is calc-alkaline and consists of potassium rich andesite as well as basaltic andesites. The Cerro Escorial ignimbrite may have originated in the crust and is dacitic. Trachydacite is found at Cerro Negro. Phenocrysts include augite, hypersthene and plagioclase with rare olivine. The basement beneath Corrida de Cori is mostly buried, but occasional outcrops indicate Paleozoic granites and sedimentary and volcanic rocks.

Alteration by hydrothermal and fumarolic processes is widespread in this range. It has formed superficial sulfur deposits that have been mined at Cerro Escorial in the Mina Julia as well as deeper alteration which has been brought to the surface by the Cerro Escorial ignimbrite in form of quartz veins. This hydrothermal alteration of susceptible rocks makes Corrida de Cori's peaks look snow-covered from a distance. The Mina Julia sulfur mine was active until ~20 years before 2002, from where a funicular bucket railway transported sulfur towards Mina la Casualidad by the salar. Another mine is found east of Cerro Corrida de Cori.

== Climate ==
Weather measurements have been made in a weather station by a sulfur mine worker's camp, at an elevation of 5,100 metres (16,700 ft) or 5,295 metres (17,372 ft). The dry air, high insolation and strong winds result in high potential evaporation reaching 1,392 millimetres per year (54.8 in/year). Based on precipitation maps, the annual precipitation reaches only 81 millimetres per year (3.2 in/year) but a reported precipitation value is 35 millimetres per year (1.4 in/year).

Weather reporting began in 1942. Research in 1976–1977 found average temperatures of −5.5 °C (22.1 °F) with a daily variability of c. 9 °C (48 °F). Wind in Corrida de Cori has been reported to have "a cooling power in winter similar to the South Pole in summer." Wind speed reported in 1976–1977 after a row of measurements is 13.6 metres per second (45 ft/s) and air humidity about 40%. Winds are westerly and strongest in winter. During winter, the lower summits of Corrida de Cori can be snow-covered.

Climate data for Corrida de Cori (1956–1964)
Month	Jan	Feb	Mar	Apr	May	Jun	Jul	Aug	Sep	Oct	Nov	Dec	Year
Record high °C (°F)	10.0 (50.0)	9.1 (48.4)	9.9 (49.8)	7.9 (46.2)	4.9 (40.8)	4.6 (40.3)	1.0 (33.8)	2.9 (37.2)	4.9 (40.8)	10.9 (51.6)	8.5 (47.3)	9.9 (49.8)	10.9 (51.6)
Mean daily maximum °C (°F)	5.7 (42.3)	4.5 (40.1)	3.7 (38.7)	0.3 (32.5)	−2.2 (28.0)	−5.3 (22.5)	−6.4 (20.5)	−4.7 (23.5)	−2.9 (26.8)	−0.1 (31.8)	2.1 (35.8)	5.5 (41.9)	0.0 (32.0)
Daily mean °C (°F)	−0.4 (31.3)	−0.9 (30.4)	−1.6 (29.1)	−4.2 (24.4)	−6.4 (20.5)	−9.0 (15.8)	−9.9 (14.2)	−8.9 (16.0)	−7.4 (18.7)	−4.9 (23.2)	−3.2 (26.2)	−0.3 (31.5)	−4.8 (23.4)
Mean daily minimum °C (°F)	−6.5 (20.3)	−6.2 (20.8)	−7.0 (19.4)	−8.6 (16.5)	−10.6 (12.9)	−12.7 (9.1)	−13.3 (8.1)	−13.1 (8.4)	−11.9 (10.6)	−9.7 (14.5)	−8.6 (16.5)	−6.0 (21.2)	−9.5 (14.9)
Record low °C (°F)	−13.2 (8.2)	−12.2 (10.0)	−14.2 (6.4)	−18.2 (−0.8)	−18.7 (−1.7)	−25.2 (−13.4)	−23.4 (−10.1)	−21.7 (−7.1)	−20.2 (−4.4)	−21.2 (−6.2)	−15.2 (4.6)	−12.2 (10.0)	−25.2 (−13.4)
Average precipitation mm (inches)	1.5 (0.06)	3.3 (0.13)	1.8 (0.07)	0.5 (0.02)	2.1 (0.08)	1.0 (0.04)	1.3 (0.05)	3.7 (0.15)	4.6 (0.18)	0.7 (0.03)	0.0 (0.0)	0.5 (0.02)	21.1 (0.83)
Source: Servicio Meteorológico Nacional

== Sources ==
- Naranjo, José Antonio; Villa, Víctor; Ramírez, Cristián; Arce, Carlos Pérez de (1 April 2018). "Volcanism and tectonism in the southern Central Andes: Tempo, styles, and relationships". Geosphere. 14 (2): 626–641. Bibcode:2018Geosp..14..626N. doi:10.1130/GES01350.1.
- Richards, Jeremy P; Villeneuve, Michael (August 2002). "Characteristics of late Cenozoic volcanism along the Archibarca lineament from Cerro Llullaillaco to Corrida de Cori, northwest Argentina". Journal of Volcanology and Geothermal Research. 116 (3–4): 161–200. Bibcode:2002JVGR..116..161R. doi:10.1016/S0377-0273(01)00329-8.
