= Cerro Bayo Complex =

Mountain in Argentina

Cerro Bayo
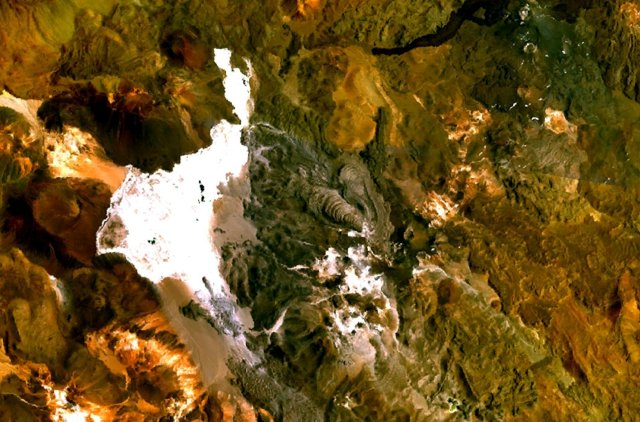
- The Cerro Bayo volcanic complex lies along the Chile-Argentina border east of the Salar de Gorbea, the light-colored area at the left-center portion of this NASA Landsat image. A young well-preserved crater can be seen NE of an older snow-covered center (bottom-center). A younger northern center along the national border has a well-preserved 400-m-wide crater.

Highest point
- Elevation: 5,401 m (17,720 ft)
- Coordinates: 25°25′S 68°35′W

Geography
- Location: Argentina-Chile
- Parent range: Andes

Geology
- Mountain type: Complex volcano
- Last eruption: Unknown

Cerro Bayo is a complex volcano on the northern part border between Argentina and Chile. It consists of four overlapping stratovolcanoes along a north–south line. The main volcano face is located on the Argentine side, thought the summit of the complex is just west of the border, in Chile. The volcano is about 800,000 years old, but it is associated with ongoing ground uplift encompassing also the more northerly Lastarria and Cordón del Azufre volcanoes. The 5,401-metre (17,720 ft) high summit is the source of two viscous dacitic lava flows with prominent levees that traveled to the north.

Elemental sulfur can be found at Bayo, both in the form of high-grade massive deposits and as extinct fumarole chimneys. The volcano formed in three separate phases that produced lava flows. One is dated to 1.6±0.4 million years ago. The volcano can bear snow in winter. The youngest dated rocks are about 23,000 years old; in 2007 a steam eruption were observed by researchers investigating nearby salt pans such as Salar Ignorado.

== See also ==
- List of volcanoes in Chile
- List of volcanoes in Argentina
- List of mountains in the Andes
- Los Colorados (caldera)
