= Salar de Pajonales =

Salt flat in Atacama Region, Chile

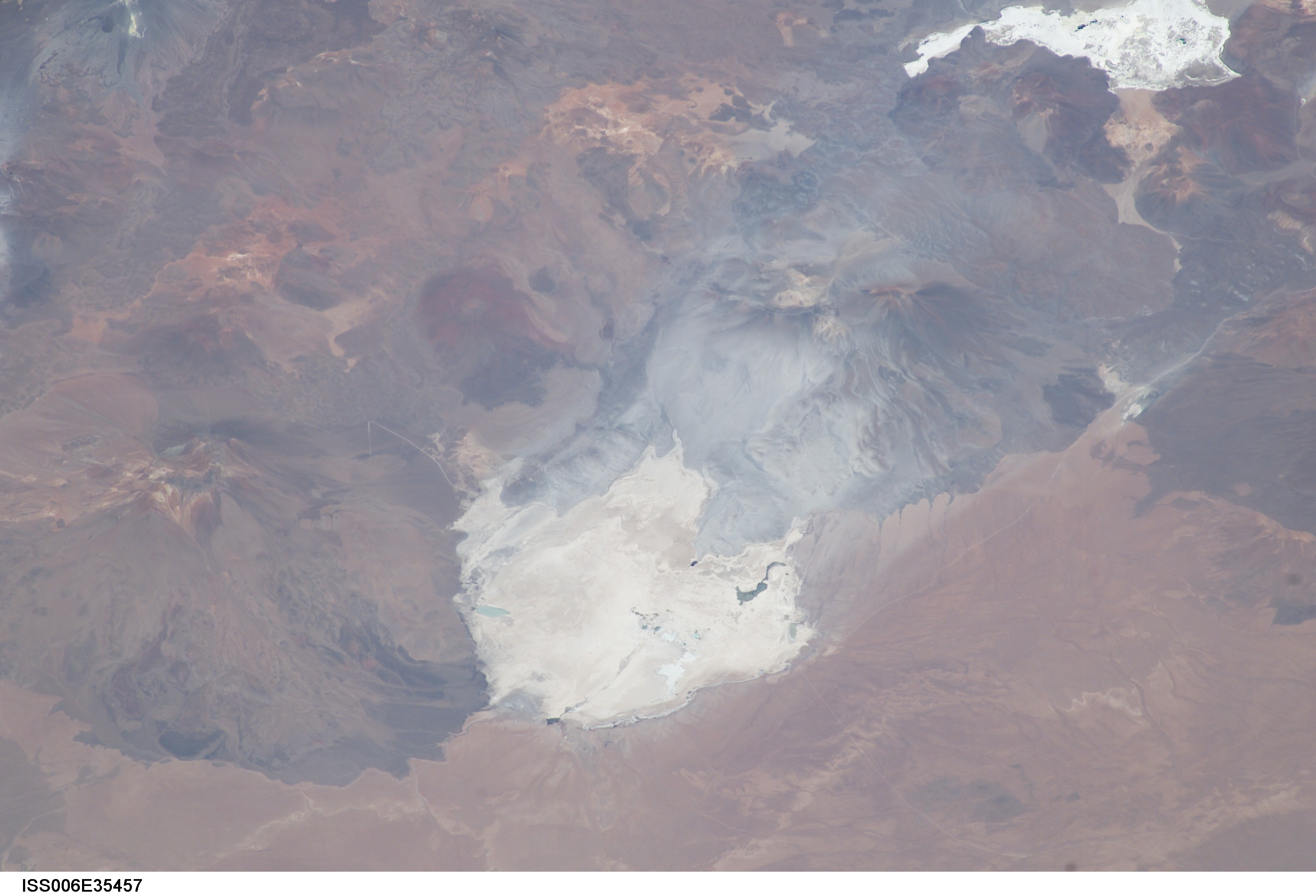
- Salar de Pajonales seen from space, north on the left

- Location within Chile
- Coordinates: 25°08′40″S 68°49′12″W
- Primary inflows: Río San Eulogio
- Catchment area: 1,984 square kilometres (766 sq mi)
- Basin countries: Chile
- Surface area: 104 square kilometres (40 sq mi)
- Surface elevation: 3,537 metres (11,604 ft)

Salar de Pajonales is a playa in the southern Atacama Region of Chile and the third-largest in that country, behind Salar de Punta Negra and Salar de Atacama. It consists mostly of a gypsum crust; only a small portion of its area is covered with water. During the late Pleistocene, Salar de Pajonales formed an actual lake that has left shoreline features.

The climate in the region is arid and windy, with high insolation and low atmospheric pressure. The extreme environmental conditions have drawn comparisons to Mars, and Salar de Pajonales has been used as an analogue for Martian environments.

== Geography and hydrology ==
The salar lies at the margin of the hyperarid Atacama Desert, on the Altiplano-Puna high plateau at 3,537 metres (11,604 ft) elevation. It covers an area of 104 square kilometres (40 sq mi), making it the third-largest in the region behind Salar de Atacama and Salar de Punta Negra. It has roughly the shape of a square, with three peninsulas jutting in on the northeastern and southeastern corners; this shape may be due to fault activity. Several islands are found in the north-central and south-central area of the salar. Only about 1.4 square kilometres (0.54 sq mi) of Salar de Pajonales are actually covered with water in the form of ponds and lagoons, mostly on the margins and at the centre of the salar. A road crosses the salar.

The principal salt has variously been stated to be either halite or gypsum in the form of selenite. There are minor amounts of calcium chloride, elemental sulfur and ulexite. The salts form a thick, brine-filled salt formation with domes, mounds, ridges, polygonal cracks, tumuli (an area covered with numerous domes is called "Dome Field") and a rough crust. A raised area at the eastern end of the salar features small holes draped in gypsum that appear to be produced by degassing. Water at Salar de Pajonales is extremely salty, with calcium chloride and calcium sulfate being the main components. There is evidence of ongoing dissolution of the salt, which has left deep pits and cavities reaching 1–2 metres (3 ft 3 in – 6 ft 7 in) height. The dissolution may be caused by salt draining into groundwater. Salt deposition is influenced by the activity of cyanobacteria and sulfur-oxidizing bacteria, which precipitate gypsum that may entomb microorganisms.

Its catchment covers an area of 1,984 square kilometres (766 sq mi), but lacks permanent surface drainages. Its waterbodies, which are inhabited by flamingos, are sustained by underground water. In the north, there is intermittent discharge in the San Eulogio River, Quebrada La Pena and in other nameless streams from Cerro La Pena, Cerro Pajonales and Pampa San Eulogio. The terrain is formed mostly by volcanic rocks consisting of andesite and rhyolite; there are active hot springs. The Lazufre uplift, an area where the ground is rising, lies in close proximity to Salar de Pajonales.

=== Prehistoric lake ===
Around the Last Glacial Maximum, water levels in Salar de Pajonales rose by about 50 metres (160 ft), covering an area of about 205 square kilometres (79 sq mi). The lake left clear shorelines with terraces, river deltas and wavecut platforms and notches. Islands in the salar were cut in or even flattened by wave erosion. This lake level highstand may be correlated to the Lake Tauca episode on the Bolivian Altiplano, which took place shortly after the Last Glacial Maximum when water levels rose in the regional lakes. Archaeological sites found at Pajonales and neighbouring Aguas Calientes may be correlated to a former lake highstand. The present-day gypsum deposits formed underwater during this highstand. The climatic conditions may have resembled these of Mars during the Hesperian period.

== Climate and vegetation ==
The mean temperature at Salar de Pajonales is 5 °C (41 °F) and annual precipitation ranges 80–150 millimetres (3–6 in). Annual potential evaporation reaches 1,350 millimetres (53 in). Precipitation occurs mostly during summer from the east and in winter from the west.

The vegetation of the area consists of matorral formed by Fabiana bryoides and Phacelia pinnatifida and steppe dominated by Stipa frigida. Other plant species recorded are Cistanthe minuscula and Cristaria andicola.

Microbialites and stromatolites grow in the salar, and former stromatolites form mounds and small domes on the crust of Salar de Pajonales. Maximum development has variously been found either in the central parts of the salar and the deeper lagoons, or around the islands. There are also diatoms at Salar de Pajonales.

== Human use ==
Salar de Pajonales lies in the southern part of the Llullaillaco National Park. There are prehistoric shelters, pircas, in the area. The European Large Southern Array observatory project placed instruments at Salar de Pajonales in 1997, before moving them to Llano de Chajnantor the following year.

Owing to its extreme conditions, like the low atmospheric pressure, extreme salinity and aridity, large day-night temperature differences and high UV radiation, Salar de Pajonales has been used as an analogue for environments on Mars where life may persist to this day. Traces of such life can be preserved by sediments and sulfate-chloride salts. Models of how life-bearing environments may appear from remote imaging have been developed on the basis of the appearance of Salar de Pajonales.

== Bibliography ==
- Alonso, Hugo; Risacher, François; Salazar, Carlos Mendez (1999). Geoquímica de aguas en cuencas cerradas: I, II y III regiones-Chile (Report). Chile: Dirección General de Aguas. Archived from the original (PDF) on May 21, 2022.
- Bishop, J. L.; Yeşilbaş, M.; Hinman, N. W.; Burton, Z. F. M.; Englert, P. A. J.; Toner, J. D.; McEwen, A. S.; Gulick, V. C.; Gibson, E. K.; Koeberl, C. (5 February 2021). "Martian subsurface cryosalt expansion and collapse as trigger for landslides". Science Advances. 7 (6) eabe4459. Bibcode:2021SciA....7.4459B. doi:10.1126/sciadv.abe4459. ISSN 2375-2548. PMC 7857681. PMID 33536216.
- Plan de manejo parque nacional Llullaillaco (PDF) (Report). CONAF, Ministerio de Agricultura (Chile). 1999. Archived from the original (PDF) on 30 January 2021.
- Pontificia Universidad Católica de Chile (December 2008). Levantamiento Hidrogeológico para el desarrollo de nuevas fuentes de agua en áreas prioritarias de la zona norte de Chile, regiones XV, I, II Y III. Etapa I/Volumen 1: Informe final parte I Hidrografía Regional del Altiplano de Chile (PDF) (Report) (in Spanish). Dirección General de Aguas.
- Ercilla Herrero, Oscar (January 2019). "Origen y evolución de estromatolitos de yeso en salares del altiplano andino, norte de Chile". Andean Geology. 46 (1): 211–222. doi:10.5027/andgeov46n1-3029. ISSN 0718-7106. S2CID 134821086.
- Hinman, N. W.; Cabrol, N. A.; Gulick, V.; Warren-Rhodes, K.; Tebes, C.; Chong, G.; Demergasso, C. (2017). Initial investigations of endoevaporitic gypsum habitats of Salar de Pajonales, Chile (PDF). Astrobiology Science Conference.
- Hofmann, Michael H.; Hinman, Nancy W.; Phillips, Michael; McInenly, Michael; Chong-Diaz, Guillermo; Warren-Rhodes, Kimberley; Cabrol, Nathalie A. (2 September 2023). "Gypsum-lined degassing holes in tumuli". Earth Surface Processes and Landforms. 48 (15): 3220–3236. Bibcode:2023ESPL...48.3220H. doi:10.1002/esp.5692. S2CID 261505919.
- Huber, Uli M.; Bugmann, Harald K. M.; Reasoner, Mel A., eds. (2005). Global Change and Mountain Regions: An Overview of Current Knowledge. Advances in Global Change Research. Vol. 23. Dordrecht: Springer Netherlands. doi:10.1007/1-4020-3508-x. ISBN 978-1-4020-3507-4.
- Lynch, Thomas F. (1990). "Quaternary climate, environment, and the human occupation of the south-central Andes". Geoarchaeology. 5 (3): 199–228. Bibcode:1990Gearc...5..199L. doi:10.1002/gea.3340050302.
- Peñaloza, Alejandro G.; Pardo, Verónica I.; Marticorena, Alicia G.; Cavieres, Lohengrin G.; Frugone, Fabrizio S. (2013). Flora y vegetación del Parque Nacional Llullaillaco Región de Antofagasta Chile (Report) (in Spanish). Corporación Nacional Forestal (Chile). Archived from the original (PDF) on April 16, 2023.
- Phillips, Michael (23 September 2022). What is that? Identification confidence of Mars analog habitats with Deep Learning. Europlanet Science Congress 2022. doi:10.5194/epsc2022-1200.
- Phillips, Michael S.; Moersch, Jeffrey E.; Cabrol, Nathalie A.; Candela, Alberto; Wettergreen, David; Warren-Rhodes, Kimberly; Hinman, Nancy W. (1 January 2023). "Planetary Mapping Using Deep Learning: A Method to Evaluate Feature Identification Confidence Applied to Habitats in Mars-Analog Terrain". Astrobiology. 23 (1): 76–93. Bibcode:2023AsBio..23...76P. doi:10.1089/ast.2022.0014. ISSN 1531-1074. PMID 36520604. S2CID 254765228 – via ResearchGate.
- Quade, Jay; Rech, Jason A.; Betancourt, Julio L.; Latorre, Claudio; Quade, Barbra; Rylander, Kate Aasen; Fisher, Timothy (March 2008). "Paleowetlands and regional climate change in the central Atacama Desert, northern chile". Quaternary Research. 69 (3): 343–360. Bibcode:2008QuRes..69..343Q. doi:10.1016/j.yqres.2008.01.003. hdl:10533/241193. ISSN 0033-5894. S2CID 121189411.
- Radford, S.; Nyman, L. Å. (2001). "Site Characterization and Monitoring". the ALMA Project Book – via Citeseer.
- Risacher, François; Alonso, Hugo; Salazar, Carlos (November 2003). "The origin of brines and salts in Chilean salars: a hydrochemical review". Earth-Science Reviews. 63 (3–4): 249–293. Bibcode:2003ESRv...63..249R. doi:10.1016/S0012-8252(03)00037-0.
- Ruch, J.; Warren, J.K.; Risacher, F.; Walter, T.R.; Lanari, R. (May 2012). "Salt lake deformation detected from space". Earth and Planetary Science Letters. 331–332: 120–127. Bibcode:2012E&PSL.331..120R. doi:10.1016/j.epsl.2012.03.009.
- Stoertz, George E.; Ericksen, George Edward (1974). Geology of salars in Northern Chile (PDF) (Report). Professional Paper 811. U.S. G.P.O. doi:10.3133/pp811.
- Tebes-Cayo, C.; Demergasso, C.; Chong, G.; Cabestrero, Óscar; Sanz Montero, M. Esther; Castro-Nallar, E.; Cabrol, N. (2021). Geoquímica y comunidades microbianas en los salares de Pajonales y de Gorbea (Chile): Influencia en la formación de microbialitos de yeso (Report). Geotemas (in Spanish). ISSN 1576-5172.
- Tebes, C.; Rodriguez, C.; Demergasso, C.; Chong, G.; Hinman, N.; Parro, V. (January 2019). Microbial participation on the production and preservation of gypsum structures from Salar de Pajonales, northern of Chile (PDF). EGU General Assembly 2019. Geophysical Research Abstracts. Vol. 21.
- Warren-Rhodes, Kimberley; Cabrol, Nathalie A.; Phillips, Michael; Tebes-Cayo, Cinthya; Kalaitzis, Freddie; Ayma, Diego; Demergasso, Cecilia; Chong-Diaz, Guillermo; Lee, Kevin; Hinman, Nancy; Rhodes, Kevin L.; Boyle, Linda Ng; Bishop, Janice L.; Hofmann, Michael H.; Hutchinson, Neil; Javiera, Camila; Moersch, Jeffrey; Mondro, Claire; Nofke, Nora; Parro, Victor; Rodriguez, Connie; Sobron, Pablo; Sarazzin, Philippe; Wettergreen, David; Zacny, Kris (6 March 2023). "Orbit-to-ground framework to decode and predict biosignature patterns in terrestrial analogues". Nature Astronomy. 7 (4): 406–422. Bibcode:2023NatAs...7..406W. doi:10.1038/s41550-022-01882-x. ISSN 2397-3366. S2CID 257386317.
