= Los Colorados (caldera) =

Caldera in Chile

Coordinates: 26.09°S 68.32°W

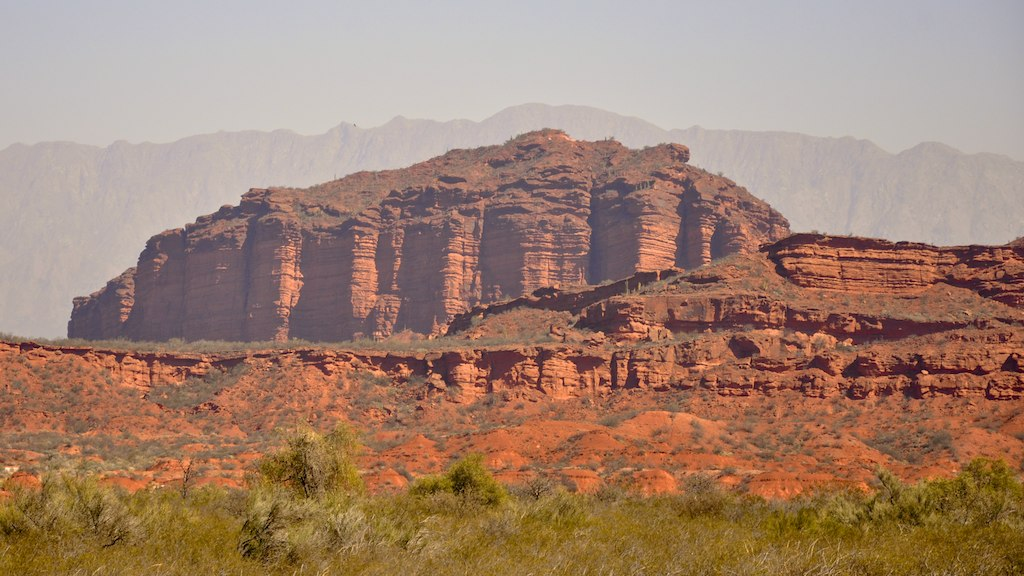

Los Colorados is the name of a caldera in Chile. It is part of the Central Volcanic Zone of the Andes.

The caldera has a diameter of 30 kilometres (19 mi) and was formed 9.8 million years ago within a basement consisting of Paleozoic rocks, Miocene ignimbrites and older volcanoes.

The caldera is the source of the 500 cubic kilometres (120 cu mi) Los Colorados ignimbrite, which was erupted 7.9-7.76 million years ago. This ignimbrite is formed by highly welded dacite, is rich in pumice and has a dark pink colour. Quartz, sherds are also widespread. This ignimbrite covers a surface area of 89.03 square kilometres (34.37 sq mi), spilling into Argentina. Part of the Los Colorados ignimbrite has been identified at the Laguna Amarga caldera.

After the formation of the caldera, between 6.9 and 6.8 million years ago the Abra Grande, Aguas Calientes and Río Grande stratovolcanoes grew in the caldera. Lava flows from Cerro Bayo and Cordón del Azufre have invaded the northwestern sector of the caldera.

The Los Colorados caldera coalesces with the Lazufre structure along the Archibarca lineament and is associated with a major fault, the Pedernales-Arizaro overthrust. This fault may have favoured the formation of the Los Colorados caldera by facilitating the formation of a magma chamber.
