= Cerro Escorial =

Mountain in Argentina

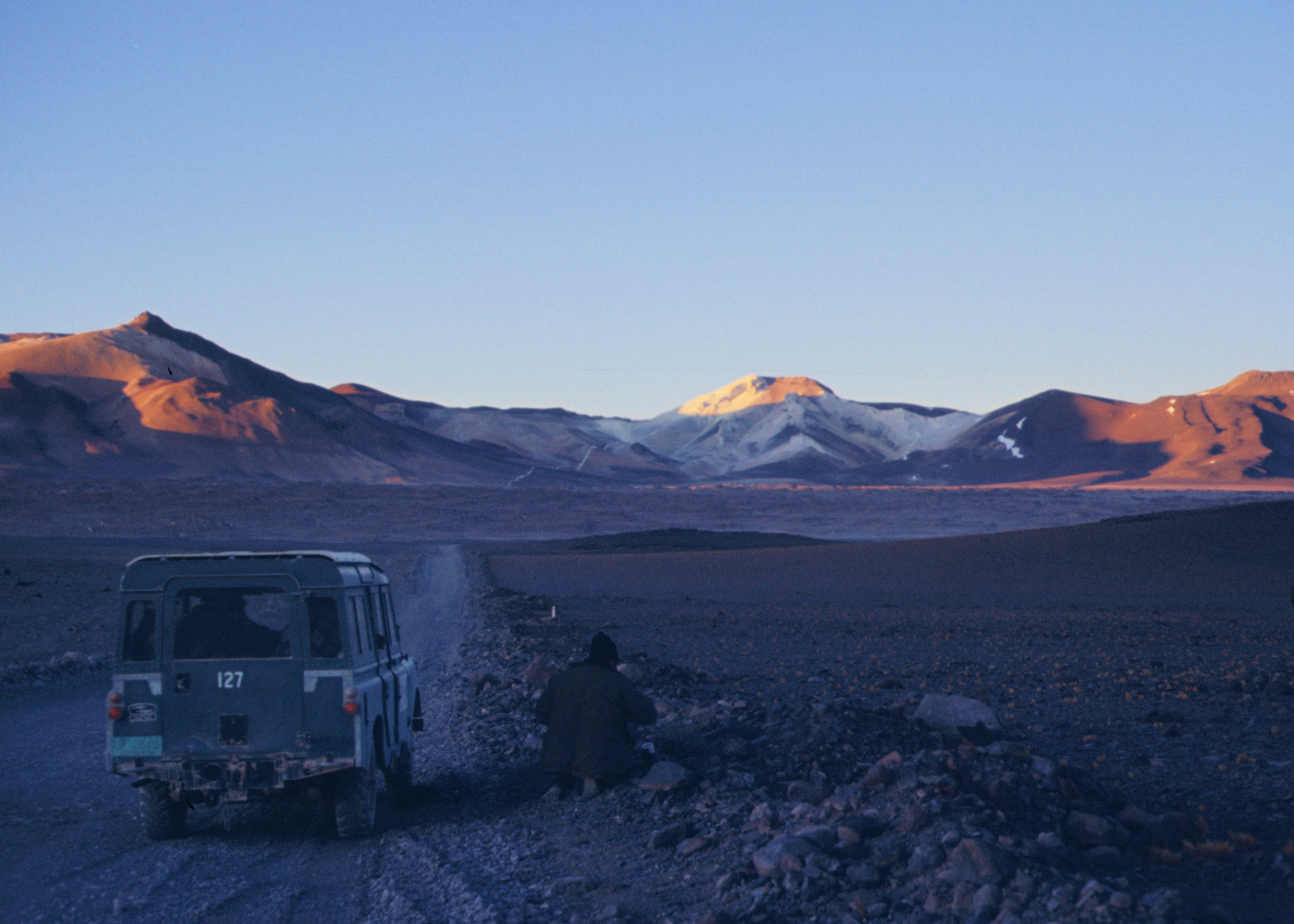
- Road to Mina Julia on Cerro Escorial (1970).

Highest point
- Elevation: 5,451 m (17,884 ft)
- Coordinates: 25.083°S 68.367°W

Geography
- Location: Argentina and Chile
- Parent range: Andes

Geology
- Mountain type: Stratovolcano

Cerro Escorial is a stratovolcano at the border of Argentina and Chile. It is part of the Corrida de Cori volcanic group and its youngest member. A well-preserved 1-kilometre-wide (0.6 mi) crater forms its summit area. Lava flows are found on the Chilean and smaller ones on the Argentinian side, the former reaching as far as 3–4 kilometres (1.9–2.5 mi) from the volcano. One of these is dated 342,000 years ago by argon-argon dating.

Off the western coast of South America, the Nazca Plate subducts beneath the South America Plate. This process has given rise to the Andes mountain chain and the Altiplano-Puna high plateau, which formed through shortening of the crust that lasted until 1 million years ago. Cerro Escorial rises from the Puna, which is dissected at Cerro Escorial by the Archibarca lineament; it is a strike-slip fault that has facilitated the ascent of magma.

Andesite lavas were erupted during the Miocene and Pliocene. Hydrothermal alteration has affected an area 4 kilometres (2.5 mi) from the crater. A Plinian eruption on Escorial was the source of the dacitic Escorial ignimbrite, which is also known as the Corrida de Cori ignimbrite or Caletones Cori ignimbrite. Pulsed changes in the magma supply during the eruption generated a radial ignimbrite structure which was deposited in various flows. The source magma underwent significant crustal contamination and contains quartz veins, indicating that the ignimbrite interacted with a buried hydrothermal system. Lithic clasts including basement material are also present. The ignimbrite has a volume of about 0.6 cubic kilometres (0.14 cu mi) and was erupted 460,000±10,000 years ago. The eruption of the ignimbrite was followed by more lava eruptions and the formation of a Holocene cinder cone. Present-day activity is of hydrothermal nature and the absence of infrastructure and human population in the region mean that renewed activity is unlikely to have an impact. It is considered to be Argentina's 28th most dangerous volcano.

A sulfur mine lies 4 kilometres (2.5 mi) southwest of Escorial. Mining ceased about 1983.

== See also ==
- List of volcanoes in Chile
- List of volcanoes in Argentina
