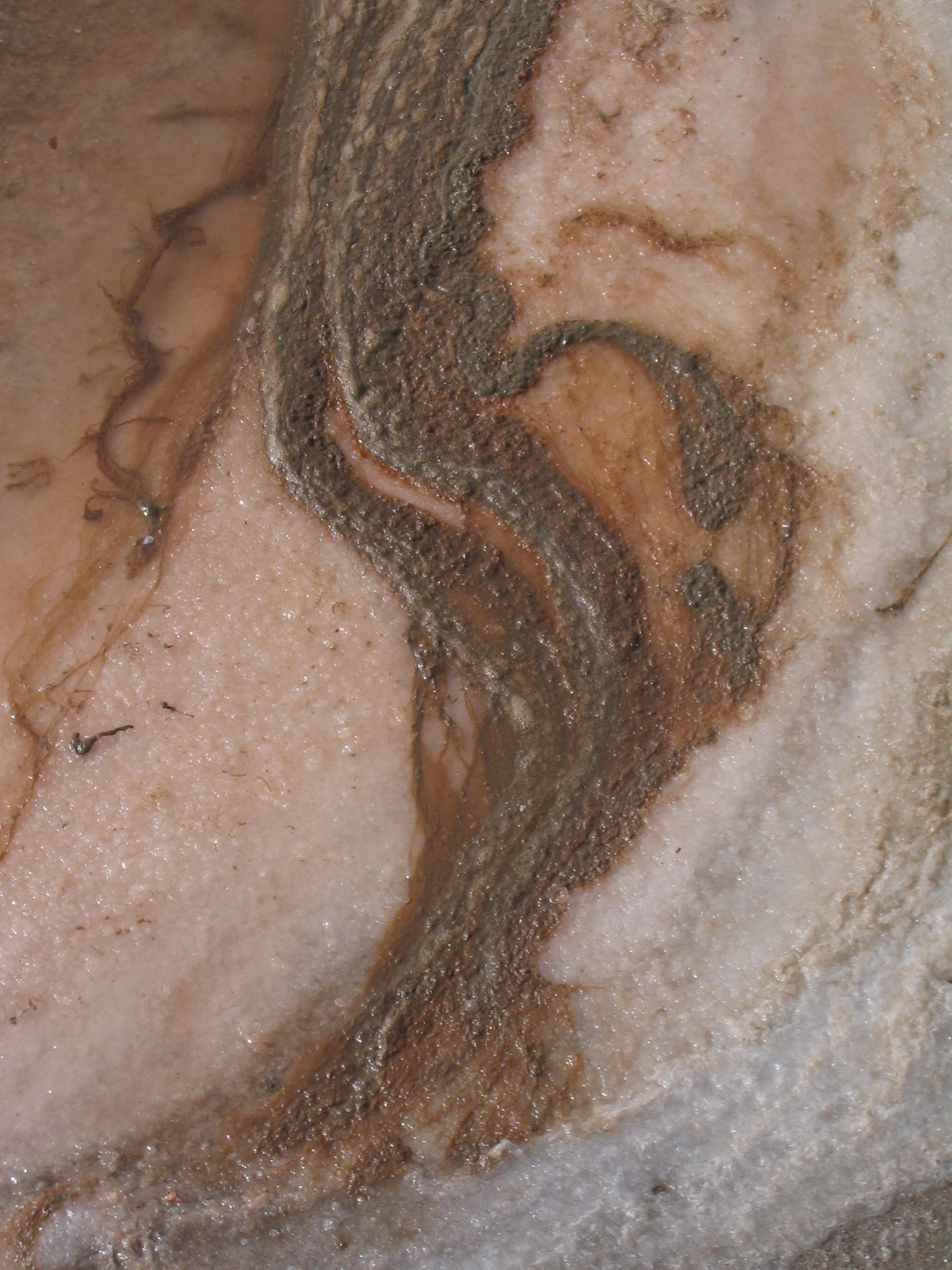
- Dunaliella salinas

Scientific classification
- Kingdom: Plantae
- Division: Chlorophyta
- Class: Chlorophyceae
- Order: Chlamydomonadales
- Family: Dunaliellaceae; T.Christensen

Synonyms
- Polytomellaceae

= Dunaliellaceae =

Family of algae

Dunaliellaceae is a family of algae in the order Chlamydomonadales. It is widespread in freshwater and saline environments worldwide, less so in marine waters.

Members of the family Dunaliellaceae are single-celled, flagellate algae. They are of various shapes (most commonly spheroidal, less commonly flattened), without sharp edges, ribs or processes. The periplast lacks cell walls or other coverings, such as scales, and are thus flexible to varying degrees. Two or four flagella are present. The chloroplast is variable in shape, and a both a pyrenoid and stigma may be present or absent; some taxa are colorless and lack chloroplasts (or at least they are reduced to leucoplasts). Reproduction occurs by cell division, which begins at the apex of the cell.

Dunaliellaceae, as currently circumscribed, is polyphyletic. A systematic revision is underway that includes molecular data to better reflect phylogenetic relationships. Currently, both the traditional name Dunaliellaceae is in use, along with names for various clades, named using PhyloCode.

== Genera ==
As accepted by GBIF;

- Aulacomonas (1)
- Dunaliella Teodoresco, 1905 (5)
- Hafniomonas Ettl & Moestrup, 1980 (2)
- Phyllocardium Korshikov, 1927 (1)
- Polytomella Arango (3)
- Quadrichloris Fott, 1959 (1)
- Spermatozopsis Korshikov, 1913 (1)

Figures in brackets are approx. how many species per genus.

Uncertain genera, (with no listed species); Apiochloris Pascher, 1930, Chloronephris Pascher & Jahoda, 1928, Hyaliella Pascher, 1913, Hyalocardium H.Ettl, 1965, Medusochloris Pascher, 1917, Papenfussiomonas Desikachary, 1972, Platella Proshkina-Lavrenko, 1945, Silvamonas Skvortzov, 1967 and Ulochloris
