= Peinado =

Mountain in Argentina

- Volcán del Manantial
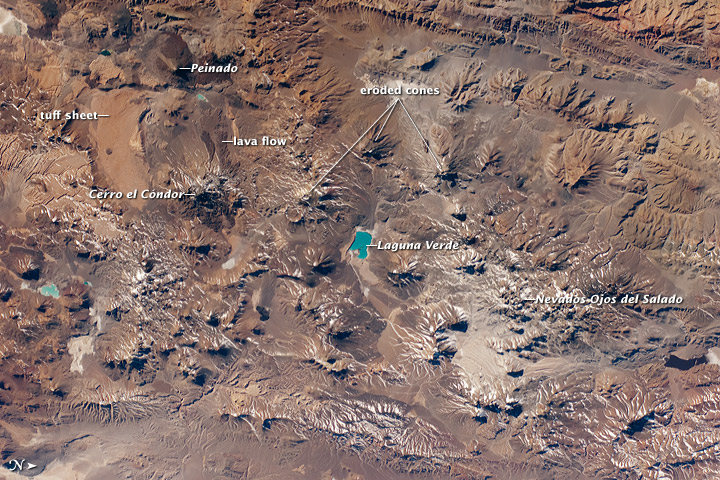
- Volcanic Landscapes of the Central Andes. Shown are Nevado Ojos del Salado, Cerro El Cóndor, and Peinado (top left), along the Argentina-Chile border. Astronaut photo from ISS, 2010

Highest point
- Elevation: 5,890 m (19,320 ft)
- Coordinates: 26°37′23″S 68°06′58″W

Geography
- Location: Argentina
- Parent range: Andes

Geology
- Mountain type: Stratovolcano
- Last eruption: 36,800 ± 3,800 years ago

Peinado is a stratovolcano in Catamarca Province, Argentina. It consists of a volcanic cone with a summit crater, surrounded at its foot by lava flows erupted from flank vents. It began erupting about 100,000 years ago, with the last eruption about 36,800 years ago. Future eruptions are possible.

The volcano is part of the Andean Central Volcanic Zone and located within a cluster of calderas and large volcanoes, including the Laguna Amarga caldera just west of Peinado. The climate of the region is cold and dry, but may have been moister in the recent past. North of Peinado lies the salt lake Laguna Peinado.

== Geography and geomorphology ==
Peinado lies in the Antofagasta de la Sierra Department of Argentina's Catamarca Province, close to the border with Chile and about 30 kilometres (19 mi) from the Paso San Francisco. Geographically, it is in the Cordillera Occidental of the Central Andes. The region is largely uninhabited, due to the extreme climatic conditions.

The volcano is a c. 1,630 metres (5,350 ft) high steep cone, which reaches an elevation of 5,890 metres (19,320 ft) above sea level and features a 240 metres (790 ft) wide and 25 metres (82 ft) deep summit crater with an ephemeral crater lake. There is no perennial snow cover or glaciers on the mountain. Twelve vents - two of which are buried by lava flows - form cones on its flanks and have produced hundreds of lava flows, which built a lava apron surrounding the volcano that buries the lower parts of the cone. The cone is formed by lava blocks, lavas, pyroclastics and scoria; the lava flows have for the most part dark and brown colours. The total volume of the edifice is about 22.4 cubic kilometres (5.4 cu mi), covering an area of 96.2 square kilometres (37.1 sq mi). Claims that the volcano overlies a caldera lack supporting evidence.

Just west of Peinado lies the eastern margin of the Pliocene Laguna Amarga caldera; its ignimbrites underlie Peinado and lava flows from Peinado have spilled across its borders on to the caldera floor. On the eastern side, the volcano is bordered by the Sierra de Calalaste. To the north lies the Salar de Antofalla, which ends close to Peinado, and the Laguna Peinado lake. A field of monogenetic volcanoes, the Peinado volcanic field, lies around Peinado. They consist of lava flows, maars, scoria cones and tuff rings, with volumes reaching 0.8 cubic kilometres (0.19 cu mi), and were emplaced between 600,000 and 150,000 years ago.

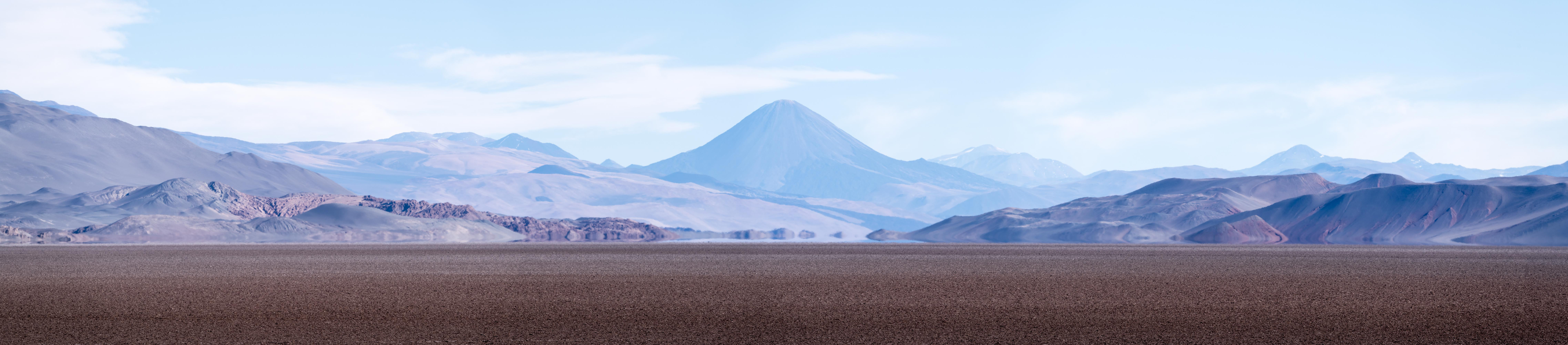
Volcán El Peinado (centre) seen across the Salar de Antofalla

=== Lake ===
Laguna Peinado is a 1.2 kilometres (0.75 mi) wide, 3.4 kilometres (2.1 mi) long lake with a mean depth of 4 metres (13 ft)-8 metres (26 ft). Water covers an area of 1.6 square kilometres (0.62 sq mi). It lies at 3,820 metres (12,530 ft) elevation at about 26°29′59″S 68°05′32″W. It is a salt lake with alkaline waters, fed mostly by groundwater and meltwater. An additional water source are hot springs with temperatures reaching 33.13 °C (91.63 °F), which deposit travertine. Volcanic carbon dioxide outgassing appears to occur at the lake. The lake presently has no outflow, but it may have spilled northward into the Salar de Antofalla during periods of higher lake level. Directly north of Laguna Peinado lies another lake, Laguna Turquesa, with an average depth of 6 metres (20 ft) and a surface area of 0.1 square kilometres (0.039 sq mi); the lakes may have been connected before 2005. At the northern end of the basin, coastal terraces reach thicknesses of 30–40 centimetres (12–16 in) and lengths of several 100 metres (330 ft), they extend to Laguna Turquesa. At the southern end of the lake is a wetland.

Lake sediments consist of an alternation of organic muds, calcite and travertine, with limestones occurring in coastal areas and muddy deposits in deeper waters. The carbonates form micrites, packstones, rudstones and wackestones, and they contain fossil diatoms and ostracods. Microbes form rocky structures including mounds and oncolites.

There is evidence of a progressive increase in water levels, followed by a decrease, which may somehow relate to the Little Ice Age. They may be correlative with regional changes in humidity, but difficulties in dating lake deposits prevent the determination of a definitive causal relationship. Three levels of microbialites are distinguished around Laguna Turquesa: M1, M2 and M3. Of these, M3 is the lowest and the currently forming microbialite stage. M1 and M2 are older and form palaeoshorelines, but even higher water stands occurred in the past.

The lakes of the Altiplano have drawn attention in the 21st century owing to the frequently extreme climatic and hydrological conditions they experience. Microbialites, rock structures produced by microorganisms through mineralization and sediment trapping, form mounds along 2 kilometres (1.2 mi) of the western lakeshore. Former stromatolites occur on the lowest lake terrace, they display laminated textures and were probably built by cyanobacteria when the lake levels were low and conditions more favourable to stromatolite growth than plant development. Recent lake level declines have not prevented the deposition of microbe-produced rocks. Stromatolites are visible just underneath the water surface.

== Geology ==
Peinado is part of the Central Volcanic Zone of the Andes, which in northern Argentina extends across the Cordillera Occidental and the Altiplano. Numerous volcanoes occur in the region, including Laguna Amarga, Sierra Nevada de Lagunas Bravas, Laguna Escondida, Cerro El Condor, Wheelwright caldera, Falso Azufre, Nevado Tres Cruces, Ojos del Salado, Incahuasi, Cerro Torta, Cerro Blanco, Cueros de Purulla and numerous other calderas with accompanying ignimbrites, and monogenetic volcanoes. Their ages range from Miocene to Quaternary; volcanism there has been ongoing since the Eocene-Oligocene. Peinado presumably developed on Miocene volcanic rocks and eruption products of the Laguna Amarga caldera. A major strike-slip fault zone, the Peinado fault, runs from the western side of Salar de Antofalla south along Laguna Peinado to Peinado volcano. Farther south, it may connect to the San Francisco lineament. Apart from volcanoes, tectonically-generated basins and ridges form a steep relief in the region; the Laguna Peinado occupies one of several north-south trending tectonic depressions in the area. Magma may be present in the crust.

Volcanic rocks are mainly andesite and basaltic andesite, with dacite being erupted more recently. They define a potassium-rich calc-alkaline suite and contain phenocrysts of clinopyroxene, iron-titanium oxides, olivine, orthopyroxene and plagioclase. As is common for stratovolcanoes, the more felsic magmas were erupted from the central cone and the more mafic ones from the flank vents. The monogenetic volcanoes have erupted basaltic andesite. In the summit region, the rocks have been discoloured presumably by hydrothermal alteration.

== Eruption history ==
Peinado is one of the youngest volcanoes in the area. Radiometric dating has yielded ages ranging between 80,000 and 40,000 years ago for the central cone and between 60,000 and 30,000 for the flank vents. Volcanic activity initially built the central cone, before continuing on the flanks. Eruptions have been mostly effusive, but with recent explosive events. The monogenetic volcanoes just south and north of Peinado developed 210,000 ± 40,000 and 380,000 ± 20,000 years ago, respectively; the flank vent that formed a scoria cone may also be associated with the monogenetic activity rather than Peinado proper.

Presumably, Peinado began its growth as a monogenetic volcano but eruptions became concentrated at a single vent, producing a shallow magma chamber that intercepted ascending magma and a single cone. Eventually, the cone reached a size at which further eruptions from the summit were impeded, causing volcanism to shift to the flank vents, which then built up the bulk of Peinado. Fractional crystallization and other magma-forming processes took place in the magma chamber, yielding the felsic magmas that were erupted from the central vent beginning 40,000 years ago.

There are reports of fumarolic activity. Volcanoes have been observed to remain inactive for ten thousands of years; thus future activity at Peinado is possible. The configuration of volcanic vents suggests that the occurrence of caldera collapse and of sector collapses is possible, and its activity has become more explosive over time. The volcano lies on an eastward younging trend of calderas including Laguna Amarga, and there is evidence of magma storage in the crust.

== Climate and vegetation ==
The regional climate is cold and dry, with a mean temperature of 8 °C (46 °F) and large (40 °C (72 °F)) daily temperature fluctuations. Precipitation takes place mainly during the winter months, the region is at the boundary between the South American Summer Monsoon region and the westerlies region, where precipitation occurs when cold fronts from the Pacific Ocean and isolated drops of cold air hit the area. Evaporation rates are higher than precipitation. Water temperatures in Peinado and Turquesa are about 9 °C (48 °F). The climate has not been stable during the Pleistocene, and may have been wetter during glacial times. The M1 microbialites are dated to 11,830 ± 170 years ago while M2 may reflect a continuation of their growth after a break caused by the Younger Dryas cooling.

What little vegetation there is, is mostly steppe grasses. Salt-loving vegetation and underwater plants grow around and in Laguna Peinado, which also features microbial mats. The extreme environmental conditions of Puna lakes (abundance of arsenic, aridity, intense UV radiation, lack of nutrients, lack of oxygen, low temperatures with high daily variation, salinity, volcanism) have drawn scientific attention.

== Name and human activity ==
The name ("combed" in Spanish) is a reference to its smooth appearance. The first known ascent was by Mathias Rebitsch in 1965, but the mountain features a pre-Hispanic mountain sanctuary and may have been used as a source for valuable rocks by pre-Hispanic people. A prehistoric copper and aragonite mine with well-preserved buildings lies at Tambería El Peinado, close to the volcano.

== See also ==
- List of volcanoes in Argentina
