= Antofagasta (disambiguation) =

Antofagasta is a word of Quechua or Aymara origin meaning "town of the great saltpeter bed." It may refer to:

In Chile:

- Antofagasta, port city and commune in the north of the country
- Antofagasta Region, the country's second administrative region
- Antofagasta Province, province in the north of the country
- Antofagasta PLC, a copper-mining company named after the region
- Club de Deportes Antofagasta, a soccer club based in Antofagasta
- Ferrocarril de Antofagasta a Bolivia, a non-government railway operating in the northern provinces of the country
- Roman Catholic Archdiocese of Antofagasta, an archdiocese located in the city of Antofagasta
- 2007 Antofagasta earthquake, M7.7 shock on November 14
- Estadio Regional de Antofagasta, a multi-use stadium in Antofagasta
- University of Antofagasta, higher-learning institution in Antofagasta
- La Negra Antofagasta, a small industrial complex 22 km. east of Antofagasta
- Club Hípico de Antofagasta, a thoroughbred race track in Antofagasta

In Argentina:

- Antofagasta de la Sierra, a volcanic field
- Antofagasta de la Sierra, Catamarca, a village in the Catamarca Province
- Antofagasta de la Sierra Department, the northernmost department of Catamarca Province

In Peru:

- BAP Antofagasta (SS-32), one of two Type 209/1200 submarines ordered by the Peruvian Navy on August 12, 1976
