= Cerro Colorados =

Mountain in Argentina

Colorados
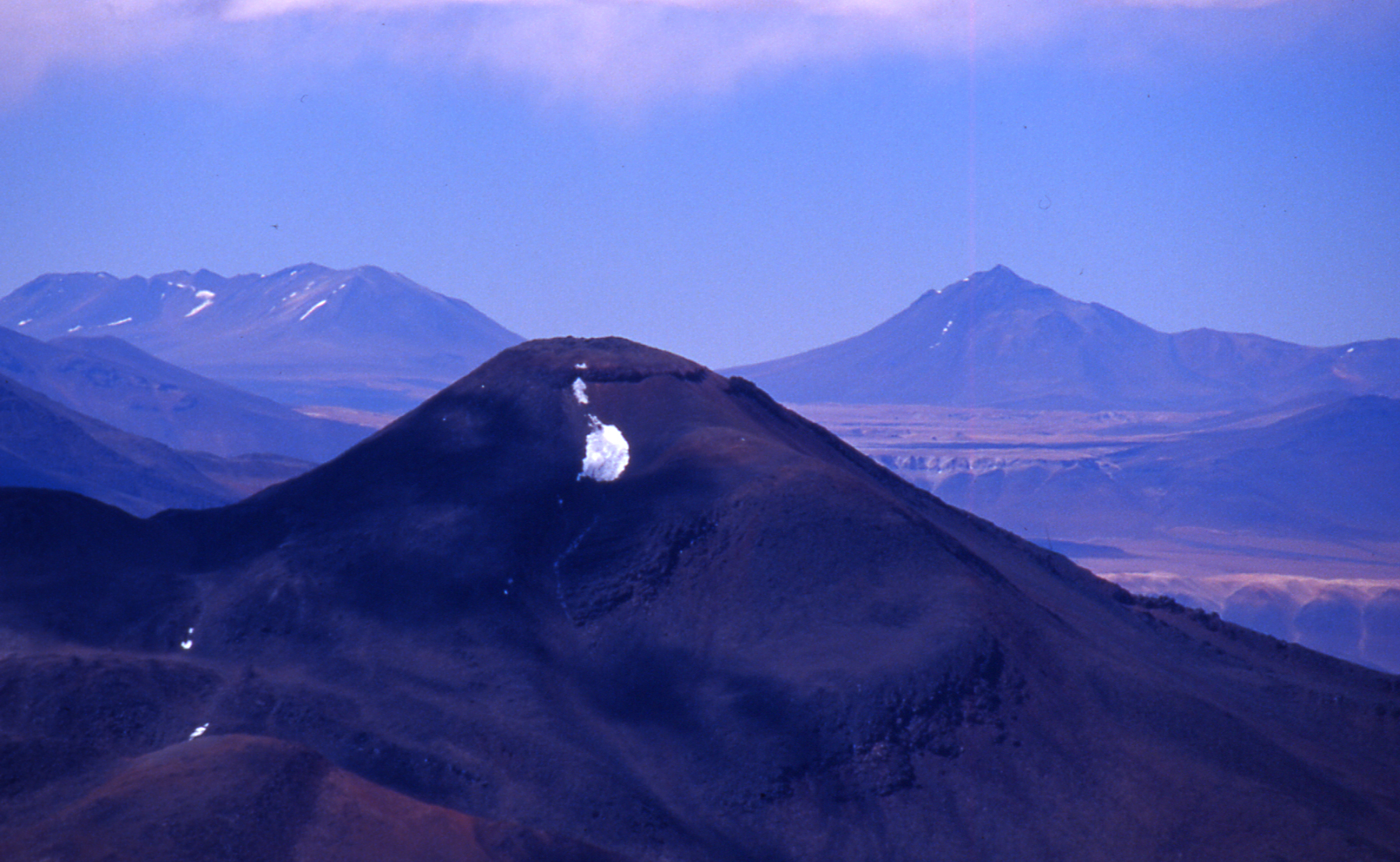
- Colorados is the long chain mountain on the left in the distance. Seen from near Ojos del Salado

Highest point
- Elevation: 6,080 m (19,950 ft)
- Prominence: 1,295 m (4,249 ft)
- Parent peak: Vallecitos
- Coordinates: 26°10′43″S 68°22′51″W

Geography
- Location within Chile
- Parent range: Puna de Atacama, Andes

Geology
- Mountain type: Stratovolcano

Climbing
- First ascent: 10/19/1999 - Henri Barret (France), Walter Sinay, Catalino Soriano (Argentina)

Cerro Colorados is a mountain in the Andes, at the border of Argentina and Chile. It has a height of 6,080 metres (19,950 ft). It and the neighbouring peak of Vallecitos lie in a very remote area west of the Salar de Antofalla and were not climbed until 1999. Its slopes are shared between the territory of the Argentinean province of Catamarca (commune of Antofagasta de la Sierra) and the Chilean province of Chañaral (commune of Diego de Almagro).

== First Ascent ==
Colorados was first climbed by Henri Barret (France), Walter Sinay and Catalino Soriano (Argentina) October 19, 1999.

== Elevation ==
Other data from available digital elevation models: SRTM yields 6054 metres, ASTER 6035 metres and TanDEM-X 6094 metres. The height of the nearest key col is 4785 meters, leading to a topographic prominence of 1295 meters. Colorados is considered a Mountain Subrange according to the Dominance System and its dominance is 21.3%. Its parent peak is Vallecitos and the Topographic isolation is 7.3 kilometers.

== See also ==
- List of mountains in the Andes
