= Sierra Nevada de Lagunas Bravas =

Mountain in Argentina

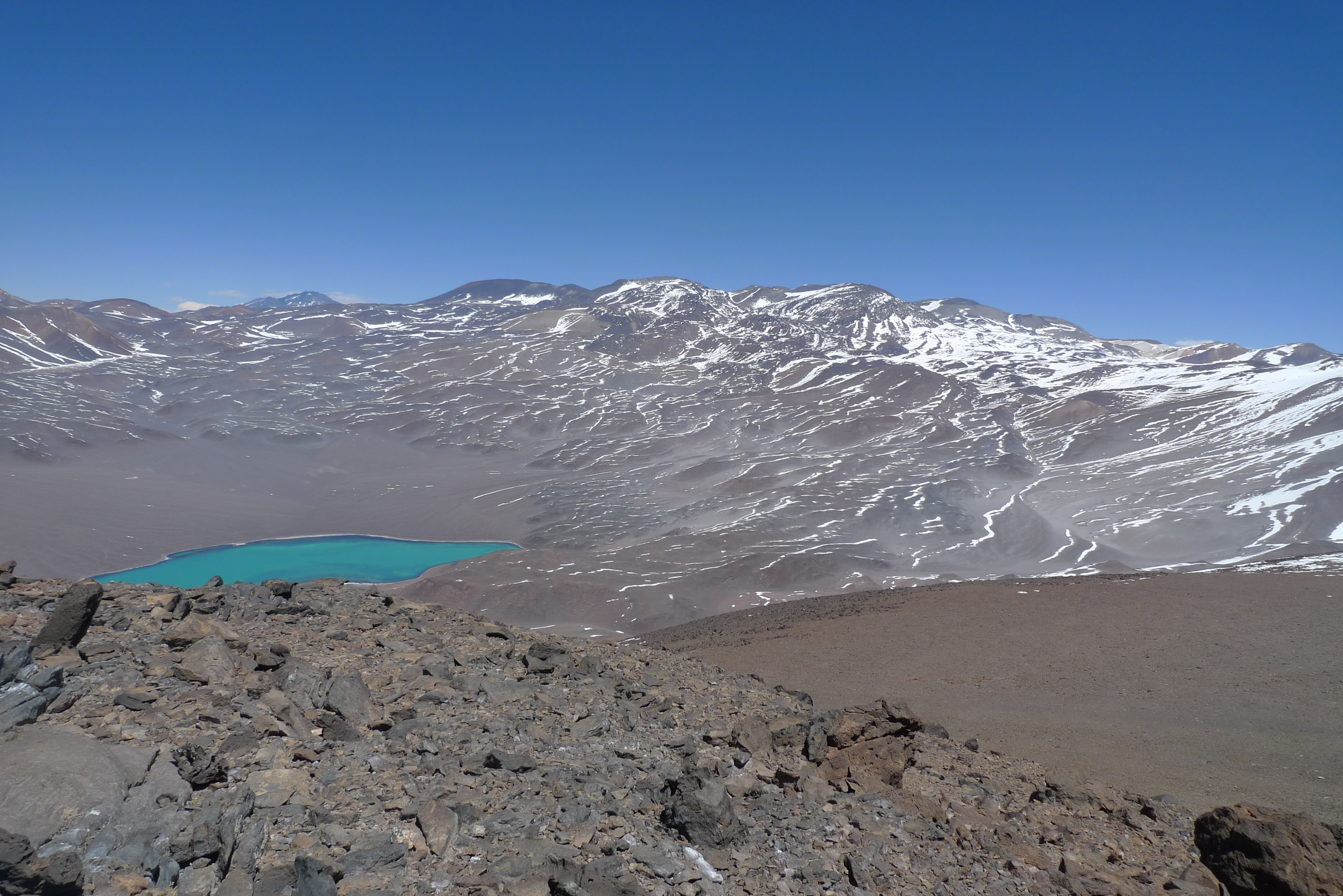

Highest point
- Elevation: 6,137 (Note: Other elevation data from available digital elevation models are 6,137 metres (20,135 ft) from SRTM, 6,122 metres (20,085 ft) from ASTER and 6,172 metres (20,249 ft) from TanDEM-X. The nearest key col reaches 4,788 metres (15,709 ft) elevation and a topographic prominence of 1,352 metres (4,436 ft), with a dominance of 22.02%. Its parent peak is Cerro El Condor and the Topographic isolation is 25.2 kilometers.) m (20,135 ft)
- Prominence: 1,352 m (4,436 ft)
- Parent peak: Cerro El Condor
- Coordinates: 26°29′26.88″S 068°33′32.76″W

Geography
- Location within Argentina
- Location: Argentina / Chile
- Parent range: Andes

Geology
- Rock age: Holocene
- Mountain type: Stratovolcano
- Last eruption: Unknown

Climbing
- First ascent: Highest summit: 11/05/2014 - Henri Barret (France), Walter Sinay, Eduardo Namur, Claudio Recchia and Guillermo Almaraz (Argentina) / Secondary 6127 metre summit - December 12, 2000 - Robert Ayers, Tony Brake, Paul Doherty, Paul Morgan - United States

Sierra Nevada, also known as Sierra Nevada de Lagunas Bravas, is a major ignimbrite-lava dome complex which lies in both Chile and Argentina in one of the most remote parts of the Central Andes.

Activity in the complex started in Argentina and formed two stratovolcanoes. Later, 12 or more vents formed, some with craters up to 400 metres (1,300 ft) wide. Lava flows up to 7 kilometres (4.3 mi) long with flow ridges are also found. It covers a total area of 225 km^{2}. Radiometric dating has yielded ages of 1.7 ± 0.4 to 0.431 ± 0.012 million years ago, a lava flow from the neighbouring Azufrera Los Cuyanos volcano that is sometimes considered part of Sierra Nevada is 140,000 years old. Together with Cerro el Condor and Peinado it forms the Culampaja line, a line of volcanoes that reaches Cerro Blanco. Strong seismic attenuation is observed beneath Sierra Nevada. Hydrothermally altered rocks in Sierra Nevada may be the source of sulfate and arsenic in the Juncalito and Negro rivers, and heat sources for regional hot springs. The snowline in the area lies at 5,800 metres (19,000 ft) altitude at Cumbre del Laudo.

== First ascent ==
Sierra Nevada's main summit was one of the last 6,000-metre (20,000 ft) peaks climbed in the Andes. It was thought that its secondary summit, 6,127 metres (20,102 ft) 26°29′37″S 68°35′08″W, which sits on the border, was the highest. New measurements however show that the main summit is entirely in Argentina, 2.6 kilometres (1.6 mi) east. The complex has 9 main summits.

== See also ==
- List of volcanoes in Argentina
- List of volcanoes in Chile

== Sources ==
- González-Ferrán, Oscar (1995). Volcanes de Chile. Santiago, Chile: Instituto Geográfico Militar. pp. 215–220. ISBN 956-202-054-1. (in Spanish; also includes volcanoes of Argentina, Bolivia, and Peru)
