= Carachipampa =

Pleistocene volcanic cone in Argentina

Coordinates: 26°28′18″S 67°28′08″W

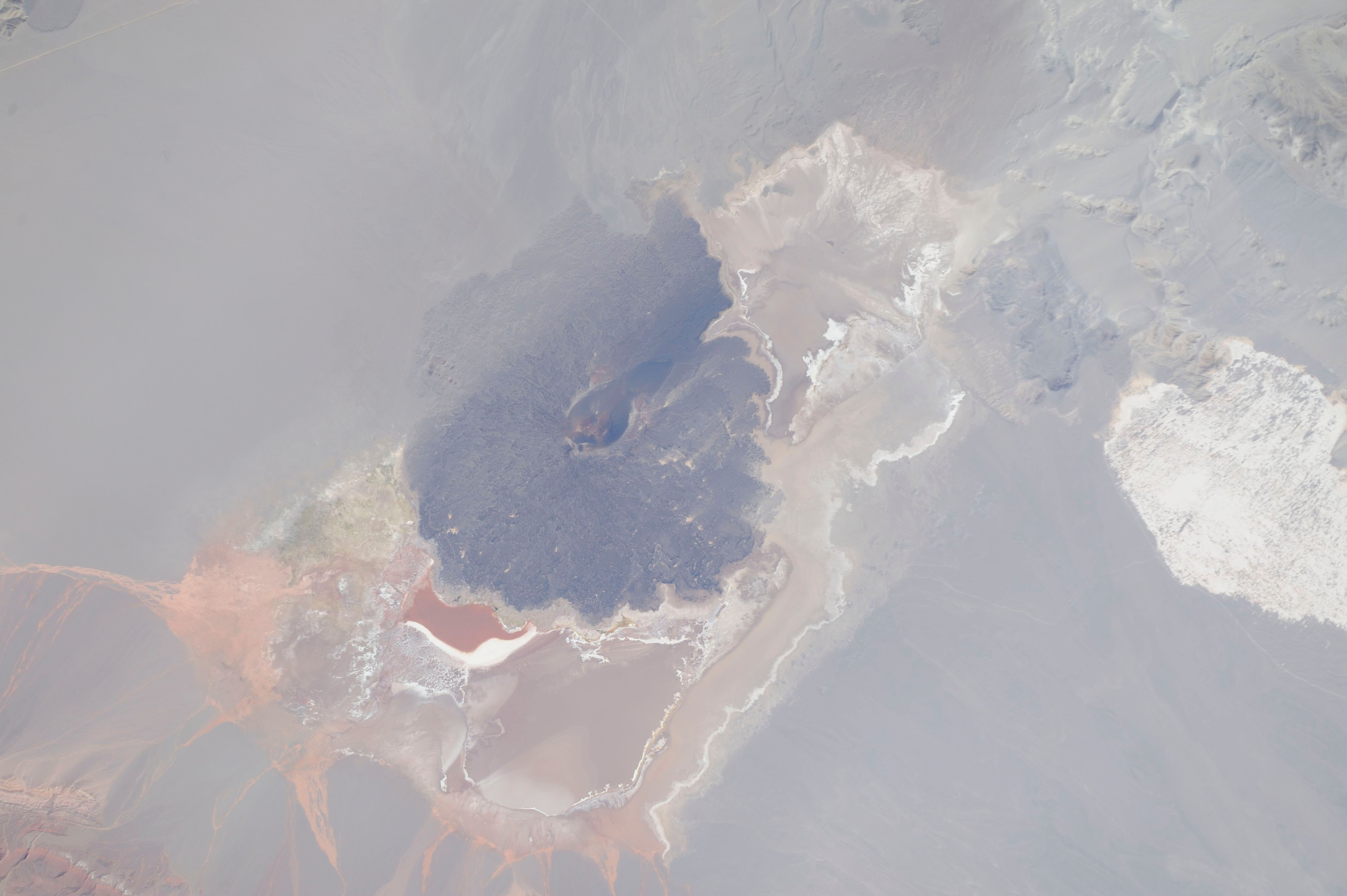
Space image of Carachipampa

Carachipampa is a Pleistocene volcanic cone in Argentina. Part of a wider, regional volcanic field, it has produced lava flows consisting of andesite. It is surrounded by a lake and a salt flat, the former of which features an ecosystem formed by microbes.

== Volcano ==
Carachipampa lies in the Catamarca Province of northwestern Argentina. It is a black volcanic cone with its summit on the southeastern crater rim, surrounded by a field of lava flows that were fed from the northwestern side of the cone. Part of the southeastern flank of the cone is collapsed. The occurrence of eroded scoria cones and lava domes has been reported. The lava flows reach thicknesses of 2–6 metres (6 ft 7 in – 19 ft 8 in) and lengths of 8 kilometres (5.0 mi), and consist of mafic andesite that defines a calc-alkaline suite. Phenocrysts are mostly amphibole, clinopyroxene and olivine. Rock samples from the volcano have been analyzed.

The volcano erupted 750,000 years ago and is part of the fourth volcanic stage in the region. There are a number of mafic volcanic centres in the southern Puna, including Antofagasta de la Sierra north of Carachipampa. Cerro Blanco farther southwest produced ignimbrites, which cover the terrain southwest of Carachipampa, and is still active. Seismic tomography has identified a low-speed anomaly underneath Carachipampa, which connects to it and to several neighbouring volcanoes like Galán and Ojos del Salado. The so-called "Cerro Galán Magmatic Body" lies north of Carachipampa; the volcano lies above its margin. A major crustal lineament bears the name "Carachipampa-Farallon Negro". There is evidence of neotectonic activity at Carachipampa.

== Surroundings ==
The cone lies at the centre, and the lowest point, of a 149 by 64 kilometres (93 mi × 40 mi) wide deserted, vegetation-free (Note: A highly permeable ground may additionally hinder vegetation growth) plain that is one of the lowest-elevation areas in the Puna. To the west, across a ridge, lies the Incahuasi basin, to the east there is a sharp demarcation with the Campo de Piedra Pomez with numerous yardangs carved into ignimbrites. Permian red beds and Paleogene sediments crop out close to Carachipampa. Other rock formations around the Carachipampa plain range in age from Neoproterozoic over Devonian. The basin is filled with sediments, reaching thicknesses of 700 metres (2,300 ft). The basin is notable for the giant (up to 1.5 metres (4 ft 11 in) high), wind-formed megaripples; they are found southwest of Carachipampa in the valley that runs to Cerro Blanco. Winds have removed fine materials, leaving only granular material on the plain, and eroded sediments from wetlands.

== Climate and water ==
The region has a cold and arid climate, as the Andes prevent moisture from the Atlantic. Winds blow mostly from the northwest and can be intense, explaining the widespread aeolian landforms at Carachipampa. Other traits of the climate are high UV radiation, large daily temperature fluctuations and frequent drying, which make the environment similar to that experienced on Mars.

There are two major waterbodies at Carachipampa, which surround the volcano:

- Laguna Carachipampa covers a surface of 0.079 square kilometres (0.031 sq mi). Located at 2,915 metres (9,564 ft) or 3,018 metres (9,902 ft) elevation, it is hypersaline and contains salty chloride- and sulfate-rich waters which precipitate aragonite. Its waters are mostly more than 60 years old. The lake is flanked by pools of hydrothermal water, and both them and (in lesser measure) the lake feature a microbial ecosystem, similar to a number of other Puna lakes, which has been compared to ancient environments in Mars's Jezero crater. The microbes produce microbial mats, oncoids (Note: Which in the Puna are also microbially generated.) and stromatolites; they consist mainly of the carbonates aragonite and dolomite. They extend along 2 kilometres (1.2 mi) of the lake, occasionally forming flat pavements. Some microbialites are of Holocene age. Flamingos breed at Laguna Carachipampa; other birds encountered at Carachipampa include the Andean goose and the Puna plover.
- Salar Carachipampa is a salt pan south-southeast from the volcano. It has an area of 50 square kilometres (19 sq mi) and sometimes fills with water, forming an ephemeral lake. It is partially covered by wind-transported sediments and surrounded by alluvial fans. A smaller volcano lies south of the salt pan.

Several watercourses, many of which are ephemeral, flow into the Carachipampa waterbodies. These include the Pirica and Colorado rivers and the creek at El Peñón. At least one creek feeds the waterbodies. The Pirica and Colorado rivers may still flow to Carachipampa. Wetlands are found mainly north of Carachipampa and cover an area of about 0.361 square kilometres (0.139 sq mi).

It is probable that in the past, the basin extended to Fiambalá, before it was separated by volcanic activity. Later, activity of the Antofagasta de la Sierra volcanoes farther north removed inflow from the north although it is possible that water still flows underground from Antofagasta to Carachipampa. Until 1905 years ago, the climate was wetter and a terrace formed at Laguna Carachipampa. Active wetlands and beach environments developed around 644 years ago.

== Human use ==
The town of El Peñón is east of Carachipampa, and the volcano/lake is a tourism destination. National Route 53 (Note: The Inca road system coming from Quebrada del Toro probably passes along a different location named "Carachipampa".) from Belen to Antofagasta de la Sierra, Catamarca passes by Carachipampa. There is no evidence of agriculture or archeological sites around Carachipampa, but the inhabitants of Peñón used the wetlands as pastures. In 1978, there was a habitation named Carachi Pampa. Bolivia briefly claimed the southern Puna including Carachipampa during the Puna de Atacama dispute in the early 20th century.

Owing to its extreme environmental conditions, Carachipampa has been used as an Earth-based analogue to Mars. Alum and salt were extracted from Carachipampa, and presently the company Lake Resources owns rights about a lithium extraction project at Carachipampa. The name may refer to Quechua pampa, "plain"; the first component may be a reference to either kachi, "salt", or kachina, a type of white ground, or Qáranpampa, "Erial sterile field", or a word in the Cacán language that means "scab" and may be a reference to skin burns.
