= Vallecitos (volcano) =

Mountain in Argentina

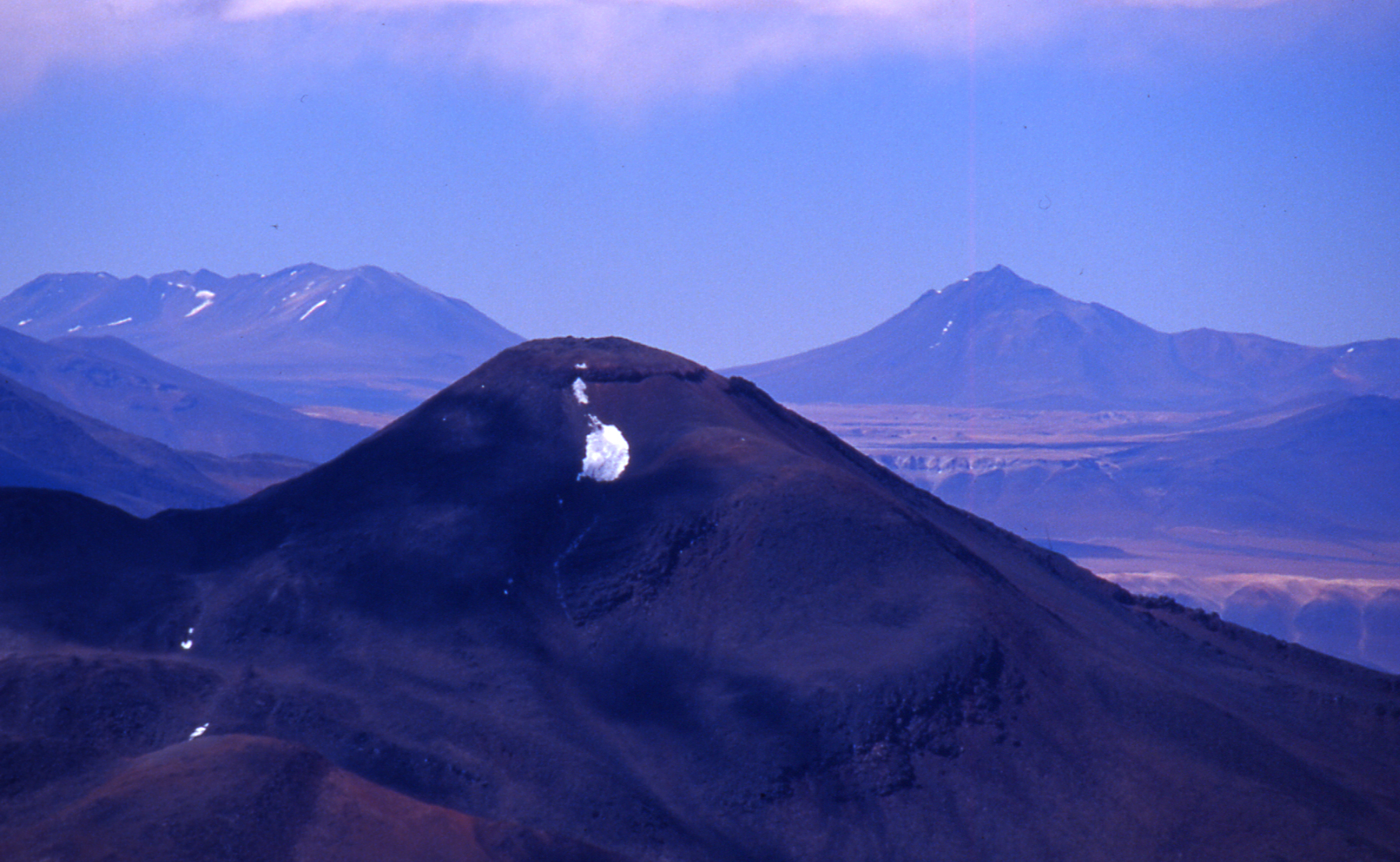
- Vallecitos is the distant conical mountain on the right. Seen from near Ojos del Salado

Highest point
- Elevation: 6,120 m (20,080 ft)
- Prominence: 1,190 metres (3,904 ft)
- Parent peak: Sierra Nevada de Lagunas Bravas
- Coordinates: 26°12′39.95″S 068°19′00.48″W

Geography
- Location within Argentina
- Country: Argentina
- Parent range: Puna de Atacama, Andes

Climbing
- First ascent: 14/04/1999 - Henri Barret (France)

Vallecitos is a mountain subrange/area in Argentina. It has a height of 6,120 metres (20,079 ft). It is located at Antofagasta de la Sierra, Catamarca Province, at the Puna de Atacama.

== First ascent ==
The first recorded ascent of Cerro Vallecitos was by Henri Barret (France) April 14, 1999.

== Elevation ==
Other data from available digital elevation models: SRTM yields 6097 metres, ASTER 6079 metres, ASTER filled 6097 metres, ALOS 6079 metres, TanDEM-X 6138 metres, The height of the nearest key col is 4930 meters, leading to a topographic prominence of 1190 meters. Vallecitos is considered a Mountain Subrange according to the Dominance System and its dominance is 19.44%. Its parent peak is Sierra Nevada de Lagunas Bravas and the Topographic isolation is 39.4 kilometers.
