= La Hoyada volcanic complex =

Volcanic complex in the Andes

Coordinates: 26.85°S 67.74°W

La Hoyada is a volcanic complex in the Andes, directly southwest of Cerro Blanco and east of the San Buenaventura mountain range.

The volcanic complex reaches an altitude of approximately 3,800 metres (12,500 ft) and consists of several eroded calderas. Breccia, ignimbrites, lava domes and lava flows have been described at La Hoyada. The ignimbrites cover a surface area of 5 square kilometres (1.9 sq mi). The volcanic complex has been affected by faulting.

Ignimbrites erupted at La Hoyada have been described as moderately welded andesites, of green-grey colour. The intermediate composition of dykes at La Hoyada contrasts with that of other volcanic rocks associated with extensional tectonics in the Puna, which tend to be of mafic composition. Some of the rocks underwent supergene mineralization later. The La Hoyada mine has yielded copper and platinum.

Paleozoic rocks form the basement beneath Cerro Blanco, which also partly covers La Hoyada. Neoproterozoic and Ordovician sequences are also found at La Hoyada. Sometimes both volcanic centres are considered to be the same volcano. La Hoyada is usually considered a back-arc volcanic centre, and has been associated with extensional tectonics. The subduction of the Nazca Plate beneath the South America Plate has given rise to several distinct volcanic belts in the Andes, including the Central Volcanic Zone of the Central Andes.

The volcanic complex was active in the Miocene and Pliocene during two stages. An age of 7.04 ± 0.03 million years ago has been determined for the ignimbrites. Another date for the complex is 9.8 ± 0.6 million years ago. Two distinct volcanic events have been dated 7.4-2.42 million years ago. Ore deposits linked with the volcanic rocks were the first aspect of La Hoyada studied.
