= Cueros de Purulla =

Volcano in Argentina

- Location within Argentina

Highest point
- Coordinates: 26°33′S 67°49′W

Cueros de Purulla is a volcano in Argentina. It consists of a lava dome and an associated ignimbrite. A large eruption dated to c. 7820 BP deposited ash into the Valles Calchaquies.

== Geography and geomorphology ==
The volcano lies in Catamarca Province of Argentina 60–70 kilometres (37–43 mi) southeast of Antofagasta de la Sierra. Cerro Blanco volcano lies 25 kilometres (16 mi) south of Cueros de Purulla.

It is the northern of two lava domes which lie at the southern end of the Sierra de Calalaste and on its eastern flank. A 1.5 kilometres (0.93 mi) wide horseshoe-shaped collapse scar dominates the edifice of the lava dome and has generated large debris block. and hummocky debris. A second edifice developed within the collapse scar. The total volume of the volcano is about 5.19 cubic kilometres (1.25 cu mi).

The volcano is accompanied by ignimbrites and a debris deposit consisting of obsidian lies at the foot of the dome. Two volcanic fallout units are associated with Cueros de Purulla. A lower fallout unit consisting of lapilli and volcanic ash extends several kilometres from the volcano, and remnants occur as far as 180 kilometres (110 mi) from it. The upper unit is formed by ignimbrites and pyroclastic density current deposits.

The volcano is part of the Southern Puna high plateau, where during the Neogene-Quaternary volcanism associated with the Andean Central Volcanic Zone produced both calderas and monogenetic volcanoes. The basement under Cueros de Purulla consists of Ordovician sediments, which are metamorphosed and intruded by volcanic rocks. This basement during the Permian was covered by continental sediments, and later during the Miocene to Holocene by volcanic rocks.

== Composition and ores ==
Volcanic rocks erupted at Cueros de Purulla are rhyolites that define a potassium-rich calc-alkaline suite. Mineralogically, the rocks contain allanite, amphibole, apatite, biotite, clinopyroxene, epidote, feldspar, ilmenite, magnetite, muscovite, quartz, titanite and zircon. The volcanic rocks have been subdivided into three separate units, depending on whether they formed before the collapse or after it took place.

For the past five millennia, the volcano has been used as a source of obsidian, which occurs at 4,380 metres (14,370 ft) in the form of blocks and nodules of various colours, and is of high quality. Reportedly, gold and silver can be found at the volcano.

== Eruption history ==
The lava dome at Cueros de Purulla is 400,000 ± 100,000 years old and produced volcanic units that resemble the older volcanics of Cerro Blanco; some were originally attributed to that volcano. At first, "coulee" lava flows were erupted and a large lava dome grew. After the collapse, the same processes rebuild part of the volcano. Notably, there is no indication that Cueros de Purulla produced block-and-ash flows. Based on the stratigraphic relations with volcanic rocks from Cerro Blanco, Cueros de Purulla was active during the last 73,000 years. It is considered to be a low-risk volcano.

The "El Paso ash" in the Tafí valley was emplaced between 11802 and 4289 years before present and may originate at Cueros de Purulla volcano. A large eruption occurred during the Holocene, 7820 years before present (i.e. about 5870 BC). Deposits from this eruption form the Cerro Paranilla Ash in the Calchaquí Valleys, while a correlation to the 12,000-4,300 years before present so-called "VO ash" is unlikely. The eruption was highly explosive, forming a buoyant cloud and depositing tephra as far as Cafayate in the Salta Province. However, it is possible that deposits close to Cueros de Purulla might originate from activity at Cerro Blanco instead. Seismic activity was registered in 2020 AD.

== See also ==
- Cerro Torta
