= Laguna Amarga =

Caldera in Catamarca Province, Argentina

- Location within Argentina

Highest point
- Coordinates: 27°32′33″S 68°21′51″WGEOnet Names Server

Geography
- Location: Catamarca Province, Argentina

Geology
- Rock age: Pliocene–Pleistocene
- Mountain type: Caldera
- Volcanic zone: Central Volcanic Zone
- Last eruption: 3.0 ± 0.2 mya

Laguna Amarga is a caldera and associated ignimbrite in the Andes of northwestern Argentina.

Laguna Amarga is part of the southern Central Volcanic Zone and one among several Miocene-Pliocene-Pleistocene volcanic centres of this volcanic region. The formation of magma chambers and thus of large volcanic systems has apparently been influenced by tectonic changes. The Laguna Amarga caldera is associated with the Cordillera Claudio Gay faults together with the Laguna Escondida and Wheelwright calderas, all of which are between 6.5 and 4 mya old. Laguna Amarga and Laguna Verde are sometimes associated with the Vallecito ignimbrite instead. The formation of the Laguna Amarga volcanic centre was probably influenced by orogenic changes in the Andes which triggered the formation of fractures in the crust.

The Laguna Amarga caldera has a diameter of 33 kilometres (21 mi) and is linked to the Laguna Escondida caldera. It is the largest caldera in the area and may be part of an eastward migrating volcanic complex. Tephras erupted during its formation have been found hundreds of kilometres from Laguna Amarga.

The 630 km^{3} (150 cu mi) Laguna Verde ignimbrite was erupted 4-3 mya ago and is associated with these two calderas. Other dates are 4.5 ± 0.5 to 3.0 ± 0.2 mya. The ignimbrite covers an area of 86.46 km^{2} (33.38 sq mi), cropping out southwest of the Laguna Amarga ignimbrite. The Laguna Verde ignimbrite ranges from dacite to rhyolite in composition, containing biotite, pumice, quartz and sanidine. Hydrothermally altered rocks occur in the area.

The Laguna Amarga ignimbrite was erupted 5.1 mya ago, or 3.7-4.1 mya, and it has a volume of over 70 km^{3} (17 cu mi). It extends north-northwest from Peinado volcano. The ignimbrite is somewhat welded and contains vesicular pumice, and bears some similarity with the Cyclops ignimbrite 50 km (31 mi) away. Further, the Laguna Amarga ignimbrites like the Cerro Blanco and Galan ignimbrites are rich in sodium. It covers a surface area of 611.02 km^{2} (235.92 sq mi), cropping out around the Laguna Amarga. Another ignimbrite, Los Colorados, is located at the edge of the Amarga caldera but its eruptive centre is unknown. After its formation, lava flows from Peinado and Cerro El Condor overran the floor of the caldera and monogenetic volcanos developed both on the caldera floor and on its ignimbrite.

== See also ==
- Los Colorados (caldera)
- List of volcanoes in Chile
