= Cerro Torta =

Lava dome in Argentina

- Location within Argentina

Highest point
- Elevation: 5,460 m (17,910 ft)
- Coordinates: 26.753°S 68.140°W

Cerro Torta is a dacitic lava dome in Argentina. Approximately 600 metres (2,000 ft) high, it covers an area of 14 square kilometres (5.4 sq mi) with 2.8 cubic kilometres (0.67 cu mi) of rocks. Cerro Torta is about 430,000 years old and is part of a recent volcanic series together with Cueros de Purulla and Cerro Blanco. A seismic swarm recorded on the 23 January 2009 at Cerro Torta most likely reflects underground movement of magma, but a source in tectonic faulting close to the dome is also possible. There are also underground anomalies in seismic tomography images.

The dome lies in the Central Volcanic Zone of the Andes, in the Ojos del Salado region. It is surrounded by Miocene and Pliocene volcanoes, but there also are Quaternary volcanoes in the area such as Falso Azufre west-southwest and El Peinado north. Peinado and several mafic monogenetic volcanoes form an alignment with Cerro Torta. San Francisco Pass is nearby.
