= Cerro Blanco (volcano) =

Caldera in Catamarca Province, Argentina

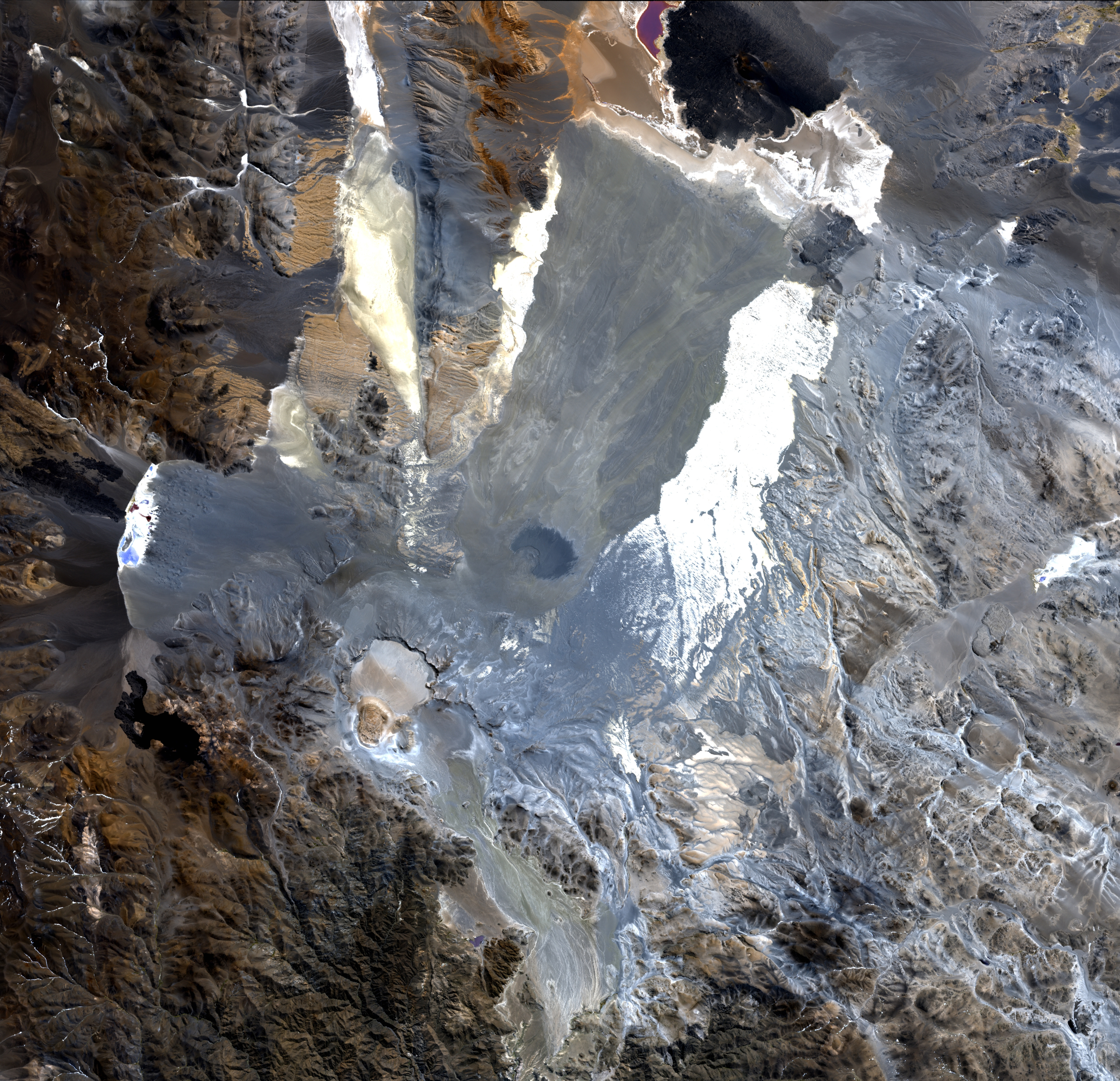
- Satellite image of Cerro Blanco volcano. The black area on the upper edge is Carachipampa volcano. Cerro Blanco caldera is located slightly left and below the centre of the image and is the grey-yellow area. Top of image is to the north-northeast.

Highest point
- Elevation: 4,670 m (15,320 ft)
- Listing: List of volcanoes in Argentina
- Coordinates: 26°45′37″S 67°44′29″W

Naming
- English translation: White Hill
- Language of name: Spanish

Geography
- Location within Argentina
- Location: Catamarca Province, Argentina
- Parent range: Andes

Geology
- Rock age: Holocene
- Mountain type: Caldera
- Volcanic belt: Central Volcanic Zone
- Last eruption: 2,300 ± 160 BCE

Cerro Blanco (Spanish: [ˈsero ˈβlaŋko], "White Hill") is a caldera in the Andes of the Catamarca Province in Argentina. Part of the Central Volcanic Zone of the Andes, it is a volcano collapse structure located at an altitude of 4,670 metres (15,320 ft) in a depression. The caldera is associated with a less well-defined caldera to the south and several lava domes.

The caldera has been active for the last eight million years, and eruptions have created several ignimbrites. (Note: Ignimbrites are volcanic deposits that consist of pumice embedded in ash and crystals, and which are deposited by pyroclastic flows.) An eruption occurred 73,000 years ago and formed the Campo de la Piedra Pómez ignimbrite layer. About 2,300 ± 160 BCE, the largest known volcanic eruption of the Central Andes, with a VEI-7, occurred at Cerro Blanco, forming the most recent caldera as well as thick ignimbrite layers. About 170 cubic kilometres (41 cu mi) of tephra (Note: Tephra is fragmented rock that is produced by volcanic eruptions. Such fallout is termed "lapilli" when it has a thickness of 2–64 millimetres (0.079–2.520 in) and "ash" with less than 2 millimetres (0.079 in) thickness.) were erupted then. The volcano has been dormant since then with some deformation and geothermal activity. A major future eruption would put nearby communities to the south at risk.

The volcano is also known for giant ripple marks that have formed on its ignimbrite fields. Persistent wind action on the ground has shifted gravel and sand, forming wave-like structures. These ripple marks have heights up to 2.3 metres (7 ft 7 in) and are separated by distances up to 43 metres (141 ft). These ripple marks are among the largest on Earth and have been compared to Martian ripple marks by geologists.

== Geography and geomorphology ==
The volcano lies at the southern margin of the Argentine Puna, (Note: The Altiplano-Puna is the second-largest high plateau on Earth after the Tibetan Plateau and consists of a number of mountain ranges separated by valleys with closed drainage.) on the border between the Antofagasta de la Sierra Department and the Tinogasta Department in the Catamarca Province of Argentina. Trails run through the area, and there are abandoned mining operations. Provincial Route 34 (Catamarca) between Fiambalá and Antofagasta de la Sierra runs past Cerro Blanco. The volcano is sometimes known as Cerro Blanco, meaning "white hill" in Spanish, and sometimes as Robledo; the Smithsonian Institution uses the latter name.

=== Calderas and lava domes ===
Cerro Blanco lies at an elevation of 3,500–4,700 metres (11,500–15,400 ft) and consists of four nested calderas with discontinuous borders that cut into the pre-volcanic Paleozoic rock, and are surrounded by fallout deposits, lava domes and pyroclastic deposits. The two inconspicuous El Niño and Pie de San Buenaventura calderas are nested in the northern part of the complex and form a 15-kilometre (9.3 mi) wide depression; El Niño is sometimes referred to as a scarp. Only their northern margins are recognisable in satellite images; their southern parts are filled with block-and-ash flows from the southern calderas. The southern calderas are the Robledo and Cerro Blanco calderas, which form a southeast-northwest trending pair. Alternative interpretations consider the Pie de San Buenaventura, Robledo and Cerro Blanco calderas as one 13-by-10-kilometre (8.1 mi × 6.2 mi) caldera, that the Robledo and Cerro Blanco calderas are one system or envisage the existence of only three calderas.

The Cerro Blanco caldera is about 4 to 6 kilometres (2.5 to 3.7 mi) wide and its walls are up to 300 metres (980 ft) high. They are formed by ignimbrite breccia, ignimbrites and lava domes cut by the caldera margins. The caldera floor is almost entirely covered by block-and-ash flows, apart from an area where hydrothermal activity has left white sinter deposits. A slight circular uplift on the caldera floor may be a cryptodome. (Note: A cryptodome is a magma body that rises into a volcano but does not reach the surface, and can create a bulge or protrusion on the volcano.)

The caldera has an almost perfectly circular outline with the exception of the southwestern margin which is cut by a 2.7-by-1.4-kilometre (1.68 mi × 0.87 mi) wide lava dome. This dome is also known as Cerro Blanco or Cerro Blanco del Robledo and reaches a height of 4,697 metres (15,410 ft) above sea level. Three additional lava domes surround this dome, and an explosion crater lies to its southwest. West of this crater there are three pinkish lava domes lined up in west-southwest direction away from the main dome; these are surrounded by pyroclastic cones and depressions.

Owing to erosion, the Robledo caldera is less well defined than the Cerro Blanco caldera. A site southeast of the Robledo caldera is known as Robledo. South of the Robledo caldera lies the Portezuelo de Robledo mountain pass, the south-eastward trending El Médano plain and the Robledo valley.

About 8 kilometres (5.0 mi) northeast of Cerro Blanco lies a 1.2-kilometre (0.75 mi) wide and 20-metre (66 ft) deep vent known as El Escondido or El Oculto. It does not have a strong topographic expression but is conspicuous on satellite images as a semi-circular patch of darker material. Gravimetric analysis has found a number of gravity anomalies around the caldera.

=== Surrounding terrain ===
The terrain northeast-east from Cerro Blanco is covered by its ignimbrites and by Plinian fallout deposits which radiate away from the calderas. Cerro Blanco lies at the southwestern end of the Carachipampa valley, a volcano-tectonic depression flanked by normal faults which extends to Carachipampa. This depression appears to have formed in response to north-south tectonic extension of the Puna and is covered by volcanic deposits from Cerro Blanco. These volcanic deposits form the "Campo de Pedra Pomez" and extend 50 kilometres (31 mi) away from the volcano. To the north, the El Niño scarp of the El Niño caldera separates the Cerro Blanco caldera from the Purulla valley.

Other valleys are the Purulla valley northwest from Cerro Blanco and Incahuasi due north; all three contain both volcanic deposits from Cerro Blanco and salt flats or lakes. In the Incahuasi valley an ignimbrite also known as the "white ignimbrite" reaches a distance of over 25 kilometres (16 mi). Wind has carved 20-to-25-metre (66 to 82 ft) deep channels into the ignimbrites.

=== Aeolian landscapes ===
One of the most spectacular aeolian (Note: "Aeolian" is a scientific term for structures or landforms generated by wind.) landscapes is found at Cerro Blanco, where large wind-formed ripple marks occur. These ripples cover Cerro Blanco ignimbrites and reach heights of 2.3 metres (7 ft 7 in) and wavelengths of 43 metres (141 ft), making them the largest ripples known on Earth and comparable to similar ripple fields on Mars. Wind-driven erosion of ignimbrites (Note: The source rocks for the ripples include both older volcanic rocks and rocks erupted by Cerro Blanco, with different main components in different areas. Alluvial fans contribute additional sediments in some places.) has generated the ripples, which consist of gravel, pebbles and sand and are covered with gravel. Smaller gravelly ripples lie atop the larger ripples and troughs and there are intermediate sized forms (0.6–0.8 metres (2 ft 0 in – 2 ft 7 in) high); they may be precursors to the large ripples and make up most of the ripples in the fields. Their wind-driven movement is fast enough that trails abandoned four years before are already partly covered with them.

The ripple marks cover areas of about 150 square kilometres (58 sq mi) or 600 square kilometres (230 sq mi) in the Carachipampa and 80 square kilometres (31 sq mi) or 127 square kilometres (49 sq mi) in the Purulla (Note: The Purulla valley appears to be the same valley as the Puruya valley.) valley. A field of large ripples covers an area of 8 square kilometres (3.1 sq mi) in the Purulla valley and is accompanied by yardangs; this field is also the place where the largest ripples occur.

Various wind-dependent mechanisms have been proposed to explain their large size, including the presence of roll vortexes, Helmholtz instability-like phenomena, atmospheric gravity waves or creep-like movement when pumice fragments and sand are lifted from the ground by wind and fall back. The latter view envisages that undulating terrain triggers the development of ripples through the accumulation of gravel and sand at such undulations. Their formation appears to be influenced by whether the rock material available can be moved by wind while a role of the bedrock structure or the size of the material is controversial.

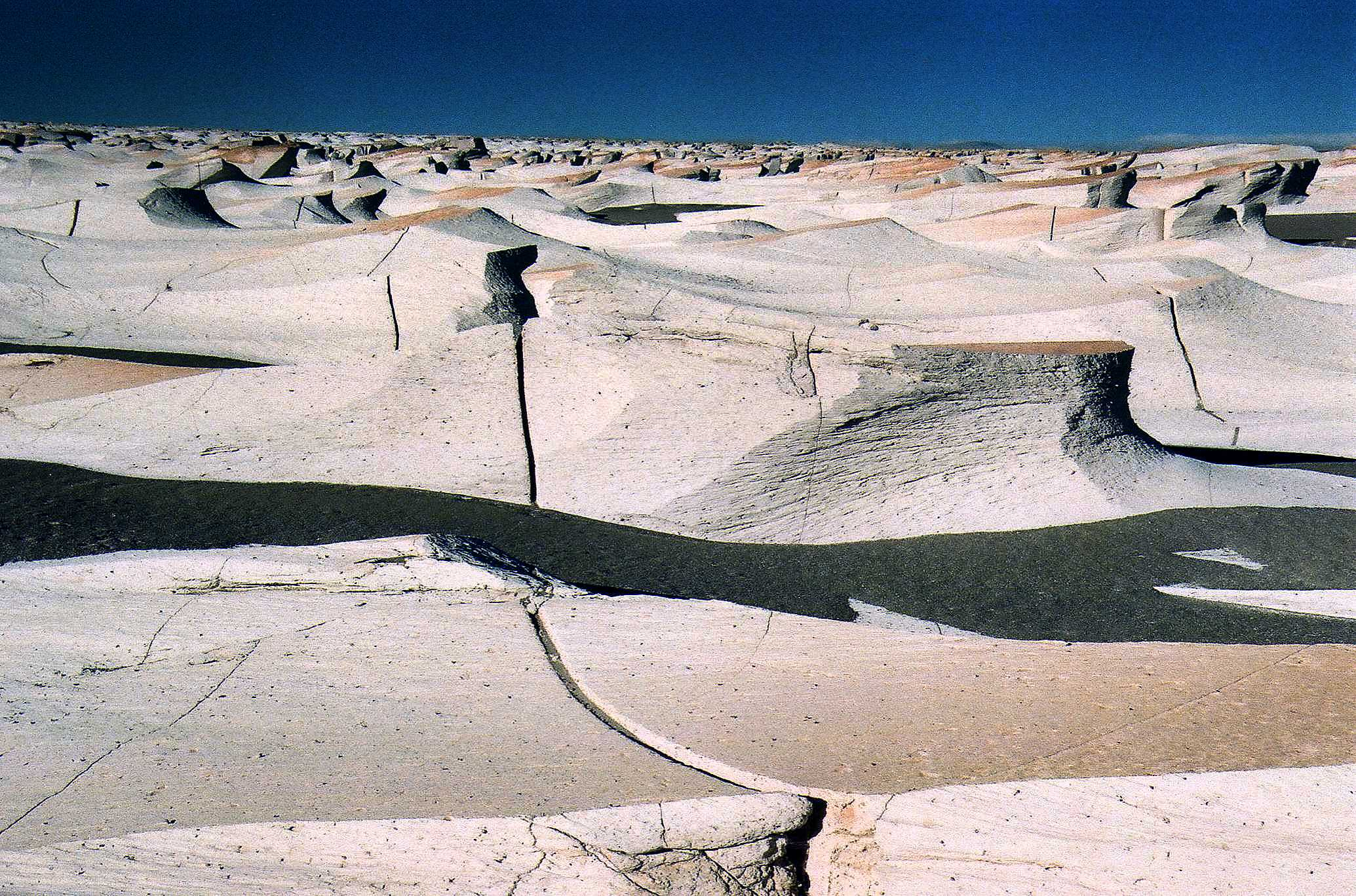
Campo de Piedra Pómez yardangs

Wind has also formed demoiselles (Note: Demoiselles are landforms originating from soft volcanic deposits, when rock fragments or large boulders prevent the erosion of the deposits underneath, leaving columns or pillars behind.) and yardangs in the ignimbrites. These are particularly well expressed in the Campo de Piedra Pomez area (Note: Also known as Mar de Piedra Pomez.) southeast of the Carachipampa valley, a 25-by-5-kilometre (15.5 mi × 3.1 mi) area where yardangs, hoodoos and wind-exposed cliffs create a majestic landscape. The structures reach widths of 2–20 metres (6 ft 7 in – 65 ft 7 in) and heights of 10 metres (33 ft) and form an array-like assembly. They have fluted surfaces. The yardangs appear to form beginning from either a pre-existing topographic elevation or a fumarolic vent where the rock has been hardened, and eventually develop through a series of early, intermediate and late yardang forms as wind and wind-transported particles erode the rocks. Their layout may be influenced by regional tectonics, pre-existent topography and the patterns formed by the ignimbrite deposits. Exposed rocks are often covered with brown, orange or beige desert varnish and sometimes are oversteepened and collapse.

Bedrock ridges are cut into ignimbrites of the Incahuasi valley. This terrain gradually leads over into the megaripple-covered surface through an increased gravel cover. The development of these megaripples appears to have been influenced by the underlying bedrock ridges which move along with the overlying ripples. These bedrock ridges are formed through erosion by wind and by wind-transported particles, it is not clear how they are then exposed from the ripples. Additional aeolian landforms in the region are known and include ventifacts and so-called "aeolian rat tails"; these are small structures which form when erosion-resistant rock fragments slow wind erosion in their lee, thus leaving a tail-like area where less rock is eroded. Wind streaks occur in groups.

The Campo de Piedra Pómez makes up the Campo de Piedra Pómez Natural Protected Area, a protected area of Catamarca Province. It was among the finalists in the "Seven Wonders of Argentina" contest but was not selected when the results were announced in 2019. The area is also part of the Lagunas altoandinas y puneñas de Catamarca Ramsar site.

=== Regional ===
Cerro Blanco is located south of the southern end of the Filo Colorado/Los Colorados mountain range and at the eastern end of the Cordillera de San Buenaventura. The Cordillera de San Buenaventura marks the southern margin of the Puna and extends west-southwestwards from Cerro Blanco to the volcanoes San Francisco and Falso Azufre and the Paso de San Francisco. It marks the boundary between the steep subduction to the north from the shallower subduction to the south.

A series of andesitic to dacitic stratovolcanoes ranging in age from 1 to 6 million years old make up the Cordillera de San Buenaventura, and Quaternary basaltic volcanoes are dispersed over the wider region. In the surroundings of Cerro Blanco lies the Cueros de Purulla volcano 25 kilometres (16 mi) north and the Nevado Tres Cruces-El Solo-Ojos del Salado complex farther west.

== Geology ==
Subduction of the Nazca Plate beneath the South America Plate occurs in the Peru-Chile Trench at a rate of 6.7 centimetres per year (2.6 in/year). It is responsible for the volcanism in the Andes, which is localised in three volcanic zones known as the Northern Volcanic Zone, Central Volcanic Zone and Southern Volcanic Zone. Cerro Blanco is part of the Andean Central Volcanic Zone (CVZ), and one of its southernmost volcanoes. The CVZ is sparsely inhabited and recent volcanic activity is only poorly recorded; Lascar is the only regularly active volcano there.

The CVZ extends over the Altiplano-Puna where calc-alkaline volcanism has been ongoing since the Miocene. Characteristic for the CVZ are the large fields of ignimbritic volcanism and associated calderas, chiefly in the Altiplano-Puna volcanic complex. In the southern part of the CVZ such volcanic systems are usually small and are poorly studied. During the Neogene, volcanism commenced in the Maricunga belt and eventually shifted to its present-day location in the Western Cordillera. Volcanic activity occurred in bouts, named "flare-ups". The subduction of submarine ridges influences volcanism in the overlying crust; Cerro Blanco appears to overlie the subducted portion of the Copiapo Ridge or a hole in the downgoing slab through which mantle melts ascend. Tectonic processes also took place, such as two phases of east-west compression; the first was in the middle Miocene and the second began 7 million years ago.

Volcanism in the southern Puna region initiated about 8 million years ago and took place in several stages, which were characterised by the emplacement of lava domes and of ignimbrites such as the 4.0–3.7 million year old Laguna Amarga-Laguna Verde ignimbrites. Some of the domes are located close to the border with Chile in the Ojos del Salado and Nevado Tres Cruces area. Later there also were mafic eruptions, which generated lava flows in the Carachipampa and Laguna de Purulla area. The late mafic eruption products and the Cerro Blanco volcanics are geologically classified as making up the "Purulla Supersynthem". From the Miocene to the Pliocene the La Hoyada volcanic complex was active southwest of Cerro Blanco in the form of several stratovolcanoes that produced the Cordillera de San Buenaventura; afterwards came a two-million year long hiatus. Cerro Blanco overlies this volcanic complex and outcrops of La Hoyada are found inside and around the calderas; sometimes it is considered part of La Hoyada or of a wider Cordillera de San Buenaventura volcanic system.

The basement is formed by metamorphic, sedimentary and volcanic rocks of Neoproterozoic to Paleogene age. The former are particularly represented east of Cerro Blanco and go back in part to the Precambrian, the latter occur mainly west and consist of Ordovician volcano-sedimentary units. Both are intruded by granitoids and mafic and ultramafic rocks. Permian sediments and Paleogene rocks complete the nonvolcanic geology. The crust is 50–55 kilometres (31–34 mi) thick. Local tectonic structures such as borders between crustal domains and northeast-southwest trending faults might control the position of volcanic vents. Tectonic processes may also be responsible for the elliptic shape of the Cerro Blanco caldera. There is evidence of intense earthquakes during the Quaternary and some faults - such as these north of the volcano and the El Peñón Fault - have been recently active.

=== Composition ===
Most of the volcanic rocks found at Cerro Blanco are rhyolites and define two suites of calc-alkaline rocks. Minerals encountered in the volcanic rocks include biotite, feldspar, ilmenite, magnetite quartz, less commonly amphibole, clinopyroxene, orthopyroxene, and rarely apatite, allanite-epidote, muscovite, titanite and zircon. Fumarolic alteration on the caldera ground has produced alunite, boehmite and kaolinite and deposited opal, quartz and silica.

Magma temperatures have been estimated to range between 600 and 820 °C (1,112 and 1,508 °F) but these physical properties (temperature and pressure) are not known with certainty. The rhyolites erupted at Cerro Blanco appear to form from andesite magmas, through processes such as fractional crystallisation, the absorption of crustal materials and the entry and mixing of new magmas. The magmatic system spans the entire thickness of the crust; the rhyolites are stored in a magma chamber at about 2.5 kilometres (1.6 mi) depth. Magma composition has changed over time, initially becoming more mafic (Note: A volcanic rock relatively rich in iron and magnesium, relative to silicium.) before returning to felsic (Note: Volcanic rocks enriched in elements that are not easily included into a crystal, such as aluminium, potassium, silicium and sodium.) magmas.

== Climate and vegetation ==
Mean temperatures in the region are below 0 °C (32 °F) but daily temperature fluctuations can reach 30 °C (54 °F) and insolation is intense. Vegetation in the region is classified as a high desert vegetation. It is bushy and relatively sparse, with thicker plant growth found at hot springs and in the craters where humid soils occur, perhaps wetted by ascending vapour.

Annual precipitation is less than 200 millimetres per year (7.9 in/year) and moisture in the region comes from the Amazon in the east. This aridity is a consequence of the region being within the Andean Arid Diagonal, which separates the northern monsoon precipitation regime from the southern westerlies precipitation regime, and the rain shadow of the Andes, which prevents eastern moisture from reaching the area. The climate of the region has been arid since the Miocene but fluctuations in humidity occurred especially during the last glacial and between 9,000–5,000 years ago when climate was wetter. The aridity results in a good preservation of volcanic products.

Strong winds blow at Cerro Blanco. Average windspeeds are unknown owing to the lack of measurements in the thinly populated region and there are contrasting reports on wind speed extremes but gusts of 20–30 metres per second (66–98 ft/s) have been recorded in July and wind speeds in early December 2010 regularly exceeded 9.2 metres per second (33 km/h). Winds blow mainly from the northwest, and have been stable in that orientation for the past 2 million years. This favoured the development of extensive aeolian landforms although winds coming from other directions also play a role. Thermal winds are generated by differential heating of surfaces in the region, and diurnal winds are controlled by the day-night cycle. Winds kick up pyroclastic material, generating dust storms which remove dust and sand from the area. Some of the dust is carried out into the Pampa, where it forms loess deposits, and dust deposition at Cerro Blanco can quickly obscure vehicle tracks. Dust devils have been observed.

== Eruption history ==
The Cerro Blanco volcanic system has been active during the Pleistocene and Holocene. When activity started (Note: The 6.3 ± 0.2 million years old Rosada Ignimbrite may have originated in the area of Cerro Blanco. It has been hypothesized that the Aguada Alumbrera Ignimbrite, which crops out south of Cerro Blanco, might also have originated there. In 2025, two additional ignimbrites north and south of Cerro Blanco - the 8.1-7.1 million years old Rincón north and the 9.2-8.4 million years old Agua Negra ignimbrite south of Cerro Blanco - were associated with the Cerro Blanco system.) is unclear, as it is not established that the over 750,000 years old so-called "Cortaderas Synthem" (Note: Its outcrops are limited to the Laguna Carachipampa area. It consists of two ignimbrites, the Barranca Blanca Ignimbrite and the Carachi Ignimbrite, which erupted a long time apart. The former is a massive, white, unwelded ignimbrite, the latter is massive, rose-coloured and weakly welded. They contain pumice and fragments of extraneous rock and consist of rhyodacite unlike later units. These ignimbrites, whose chronological relation to each other is unknown, were probably produced by "boil-over" of a volcanic vent rather than by an eruption column. Their exact source vent is unknown.) is actually from Cerro Blanco. The Robledo and Pie de San Buenaventura calderas were formed during the early activity.

The Campo de la Piedra Pómez (Note: "Field of pumice stone"; also known as the first cycle ignimbrite.) Ignimbrite covers an area of about 250 square kilometres (97 sq mi) north of Cerro Blanco and has a volume of about 17 cubic kilometres (4.1 cu mi). It was emplaced in two units a short time from each other. They both contain pumice and fragments of country rock, similar to the Cortaderas Synthem. The most reliable radiometrically obtained dates for this ignimbrite indicate an age of 73,000 years; previous estimates of their age were 560,000 ± 110,000 and 440,000 ± 10,000 years before present. The 73,000 age is considered to be more reliable but in 2022 and 2025 ages of 54,600 ± 600 years and 28,900 ± 3,200 years, respectively, were proposed for this eruption The eruption reached level 6 on the Volcanic Explosivity Index, making it one of the largest eruptions of the Central Andes in the past few ten thousands of years. This eruption took place in two phases, an initial Plinian eruption from a vent at the northwestern margin of the caldera produced a high eruption column and highly mobile pyroclastic flows (Note: Pyroclastic flows are ground-hugging flows of hot ash and gas which move at high speed.). Later additional vents opened up at the caldera margin, the intensity of the eruption column decreased and pyroclastic flows were generated from a low "boiling over" column. Some lava domes or volcanic plugs might have formed during breaks in the eruption sequence. A magmatic reinvigoration of the system might have occurred between the two stages. After the ignimbrite cooled and solidified, cracks formed in the rocks and were later eroded by wind. The Campo de la Piedra Pómez Ignimbrite crops out mainly on the southeastern and northwestern sides of the Carachipampa valley, as between these two outcrops it was buried by the later Cerro Blanco ignimbrite; other outcrops lie in the Incahuasi and Purulla valleys. The eruption has been described as the largest caldera collapse at Cerro Blanco but apart from the Robledo Caldera, the volcano-tectonic depression northeast of Cerro Blanco, the Pie de San Buenaventura or El Niño scarps might be the actual caldera of this eruption.

Several tephra layers identified in various sites of northwestern Argentina may come from Cerro Blanco: The 54,000 years old "Tuff B"/"Cerro Paranilla"/VP ash (which may be a product of the Campo de la Piedra Pómez eruption), a 22,700–20,900 years old tephra deposit in a lake of northwestern Argentina and the 10,000 years old "El Paso"/V0 ash. The volcano appears to have erupted repeatedly during the Holocene. Explosive eruptions took place between 8,830 ± 60 and 5,480 ± 40 years before present and deposited tephra and ignimbrites south of Cerro Blanco. Two tephra deposits in the Calchaquí valley have been attributed to Cerro Blanco; one of these is probably linked to the 4.2 ka eruption. Sulfur oxide gases from recent activity at Cerro Blanco may have degraded rock paintings in the Salamanca cave, 70 kilometres (43 mi) south of the volcano.

=== 4.2 ka eruption ===
A large eruption occurred approximately 4,200 years ago. Block-and-ash flow deposits (classified as "CB_{1}" (Note: CB_{1} is considered to be pre-caldera, CB_{2} as syn-caldera and CB_{3} as post-caldera.)) found around the caldera have been interpreted as indicating that a lava dome was erupted prior to the caldera collapse at Cerro Blanco, although it is not clear by how much this eruption predates the main eruption. Deposits from this lava dome-forming episode consist of blocks which sometimes exceed sizes of 1 metre (3 ft 3 in) embedded within ash and lapilli.

A vent opened up, presumably on the southwestern side of the future caldera, and generated a 27 km (17 mi)-high eruption column. Fissure vents may have opened as well. After an initial, unstable phase during which alternating layers of lapilli and volcanic ash (unit "CB_{2}1") fell out and covered the previous topography, a more steady column deposited thicker rhyolitic tephra layers (unit "CB_{2}2"). At this time, a change in rock composition occurred, perhaps due to new magma entering the magma chamber.

Windy conditions dispersed most of the tephra to the east-southeast, covering a surface of about 500,000 square kilometres (190,000 sq mi) with about 170 cubic kilometres (41 cu mi) of tephra. The thickness of the tephra decreases (Note: A thicker region is found at Tafí del Valle 200 kilometres (120 mi) away from Cerro Blanco, where tephra reaches thicknesses of over 3 metres (9.8 ft); climatological factors may have induced a thicker fallout there.) eastwards away from Cerro Blanco and reaches a thickness of about 20 centimetres (7.9 in) 370 kilometres (230 mi) away from Cerro Blanco in Santiago del Estero. The tephra deposits in the Valles Calchaquies and Tafi del Valle area are known as mid-Holocene ash, Ash C, Buey Muerto ash, and V1 ash layer, and it has been found northeast of Antofagasta de la Sierra. The tephra from the 4.2 ka eruption has been used as a chronological marker in the region. Modelling suggests the tephra might have reached Brazil and Paraguay farther east. Close to the vent, tephra fallout was emplaced on the Cordillera de San Buenaventura. Some of the tephra deposits close to the caldera have been buried by sediments, or soil development has set in. Wind removed the volcanic ash, leaving block and lapilli sized pebbles that cover most of the deposits; in some places dunes have formed from pebbles.

Pyroclastic flows also formed, perhaps through instability of the eruption column (unit "CB_{2}3"), and spread away from the volcano through surrounding valleys. They reached distances of 35 kilometres (22 mi) from Cerro Blanco and while many of their up to 30-metre (98 ft) thick deposits are heavily eroded well-exposed outcrops occur south of the volcano at Las Papas. They consist of pumice fragments of varying sizes embedded within ash, as well as country rock that was torn up and embedded in the flows. In the south, pyroclastic flows descending valleys partially overflowed their margins to flood adjacent valleys and reached the Bolsón de Fiambalá. North-westward and north-eastward flowing ignimbrites generated ignimbrite fans in the Purulla and Carachipampa valleys, respectively.

The deposits from this event are also known as Cerro Blanco Ignimbrite, as Ignimbrite of the second cycle or El Médano or Purulla Ignimbrite. Formerly these were dated to be 12,000 and 22,000 years old, respectively, and related to the Cerro Blanco and (potentially) Robledo calderas. Cerro Blanco is considered to be the youngest caldera of the Central Andes.

With a volume of 110 cubic kilometres (26 cu mi) of tephra, (Note: A dense rock equivalent of 83 cubic kilometres (20 cu mi) has been estimated.) the 4.2 ka eruption has been tentatively classified as 7 on the Volcanic Explosivity Index, making it comparable to the largest known Holocene volcanic eruptions. It is the largest known Holocene eruption in the Central Andes and of the Central Volcanic Zone, larger than the 1600 Huaynaputina eruption, the largest historical eruption of the Central Volcanic Zone. Most of the erupted volume was ejected by the eruption column, while only about 8.5 cubic kilometres (2.0 cu mi) ended up in pyroclastic flows. Caldera collapse occurred during the course of the eruption, generating the unusually small (for the size of the eruption) Cerro Blanco caldera through a probably irregular collapse.

Some authors have postulated that mid-Holocene eruptions of Cerro Blanco impacted human communities in the region. Tephra deposits in the Formative Period archaeological site of Palo Blanco in the Bolsón de Fimabalá have been attributed to Cerro Blanco, as is a tephra layer in an archaeological site close to Antofagasta de la Sierra. At Cueva Abra del Toro in northeastern Catamarca Province, rodents disappeared after the eruption and there was a change in human activity. The eruptions of Cerro Blanco may – together with more local seismic activity – be responsible for the low population density of the Fiambalá region, Chaschuil valley and western Tinogasta Department during the Archaic period between 10,000 and 3,000 years ago. The eruption is not recorded in the known oral tradition of the region. The 4.2 kiloyear climatic event occurred at the same time; it may be in some way related to the Cerro Blanco eruption.

=== Post–4.2 ka activity ===
After the caldera-forming eruption, renewed effusive eruptions generated the lava domes southwest of and on the margin of the Cerro Blanco caldera and phreatic/phreatomagmatic activity occurred. The current topography of Cerro Blanco is formed by the deposits from this stage, whose activity was influenced by intersecting fault systems including a northeast-southwest trending fault that controls the position of lava domes outside and fumarolic vents within the caldera.

It's not clear how long after the 4.2 ka eruption this activity occurred, but it has been grouped as the "CB_{3}" unit (the domes are classified as "CB_{3}1"). This activity also generated block-and-ash deposits (unit "CB_{3}2") on the caldera floor. The domes are of rhyolitic composition, the block-and-ash deposits consist of ash and lapilli and appear to have formed when domes collapsed. As lava domes grow, they tend to become unstable as their vertical extent increases until they collapse. Additionally, internally generated explosions appear to have occurred at Cerro Blanco as lava domes grew and sometimes completely destroyed the domes. The 3.5 ka "Alemanía" ash in northwestern Argentina may be a product of post-4.2 ka eruptions of Cerro Blanco.

== Present-day status ==
No (Note: Ferdinand von Wolff linked an 1883 flood in the Bolsón de Fiambalá to an explosion at a volcano he named "Cerro Blanco".) historical eruptions have been observed or recorded at Cerro Blanco, but various indicators imply that it is still active. In 2007–2009, seismic swarms were recorded at less than 15 kilometres (9.3 mi) depth.

Geothermal activity occurs at Cerro Blanco, and manifests itself on the caldera floor through hot ground, fumaroles, diffuse degassing of CO_{2} at a rate of 180 kilograms per day (2.1 g/s), and reportedly hot springs and mud volcanoes; phreatic eruptions may have occurred in the past. Fumaroles release mainly carbon dioxide and water vapour with smaller amounts of hydrogen, hydrogen sulfide and methane; they reach temperatures of 93.7 °C (200.7 °F) while temperatures of 92 °C (198 °F) have been reported for the hot ground. Past intense hydrothermal activity appears to have emplaced silicic material (Note: Amorphous silica, opal and quartz) up to 40 centimetres (16 in) thick, and steam explosions took place within the caldera. Active fumaroles and clay cones formed by fumarolic activity are also found in the phreatic crater. The geothermal system appears to consist of an aquifer hosted within pre-volcano rocks and heated by a magma chamber from below, with the Cerro Blanco ignimbrites acting as an effective seal. Supporting the effectiveness of the seal, total emissions of carbon dioxide exceed 180 kilograms per day (2.1 g/s) but are considerably lower than at other active geothermal systems of the Andes. It has been prospected for possible geothermal power generation.

A second geothermal field related to Cerro Blanco is located south of the volcano and is known as Los Hornitos or Terma Los Hornos, in the area of the Los Hornos and Las Vizcachas creeks. It is located in a ravine and consists of three clusters of bubbling pools, hot springs, up to 2 metres (6 ft 7 in) high travertine domes that discharge water and extinct geyser cones; these cones give the field its name and some of them were active until 2000. Water temperatures range between 32–67.4 °C (89.6–153.3 °F), the vents are settled by extremophilic organisms. The springs deposit travertine, (Note: Travertines are non-marine carbonates deposited by ascending deep waters, when carbon dioxide degasses and the pH of the water increases, prompting carbonate precipitation.) forming cascades, dams, pools and terraces of varying size, as well as pebbles. Fossil travertine deposits are also found and form a carbonate rock plateau generated by waters rising from a fissure. The Los Hornos system has been interpreted as a leak from the Cerro Blanco geothermal system, and south-westward trending fault systems might connect it to the Cerro Blanco magmatic system.

=== Deformation and hazards ===
Subsidence at a rate of 1–3 centimetres per year (0.39–1.18 in/year) has been noted at the caldera since 1992 through InSAR images. The rate of subsidence was originally believed to have decreased from over 2.5 centimetres per year (0.98 in/year) between 1992 and 1997 to less than 1.8 centimetres per year (0.71 in/year) between 1996 and 2000 and ceased after 2000. Later measurements found that the subsidence rate instead had been steady between 1992 and 2011 with 1 centimetre per year (0.39 in/year), but with a faster phase between 1992 and 1997 and a slower phase between 2014 and 2020 of 0.7 centimetres per year (0.28 in/year), and the location the subsidence is centred on has changed over time. The subsidence occurs at 9–14 kilometres (5.6–8.7 mi) depth and has been related to either a cooling magmatic system, changes in the hydrothermal system or to subsidence that followed the 4.2 ka eruption and is still ongoing. Uplift in the area surrounding the caldera has also been identified. The subsidence has been recorded by measuring equipment placed in the caldera.

The Argentinian Mining and Geological Service has ranked Cerro Blanco eight in its scale of hazardous volcanoes in Argentina. Rhyolitic caldera systems like Cerro Blanco can produce large eruptions separated by short time intervals. Future activity might involve either a "boiling-over" of pyroclastic flows or Plinian eruptions. Given that the region is sparsely inhabited, the primary effects of a new eruption at Cerro Blanco would come from the eruption column, which could spread tephra eastwards and impact air traffic there. Also, pyroclastic flows could through narrow valleys reach the Bolsón de Fiambalá valley 50 kilometres (31 mi) south of Cerro Blanco, where many people live. As of 2024, the volcano is unmonitored.

== Research history ==
Research in the region commenced in the 19th century and was mainly concentrated on mining. Cerro Blanco received attention from scientists after satellite images in the early 21st century observed deflation of the caldera. A number of Holocene tephra layers have been identified in the region, but linking these to specific eruptions has been difficult until 2008–2010 when some of these were linked to the Cerro Blanco vent. Scientific interest rose in the 2010s due to the discovery of the large 4.2 ka eruption.

== See also ==
- Cerro Torta
