= Antofagasta de la Sierra Department =

Antofagasta de la Sierra Departamento Antofagasta de la Sierra
- Department
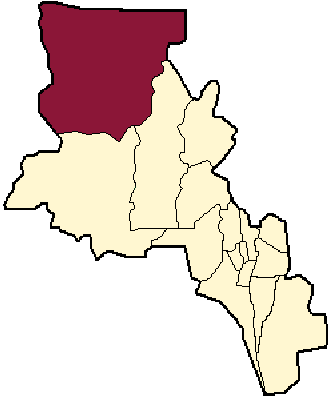
- location of Antofagasta de la Sierra Department in Catamarca Province
- Coordinates: 26°00′S 67°34′W
- Country: Argentina
- Established: 1871 (city)
- Founder: ?
- Seat: Antofagasta de la Sierra

Government
  - Mayor: Alejandro Evaristo Acevedo, FCS

Area
  - Total: 28,097 km^{2} (10,848 sq mi)

Population (2001 census [INDEC])
  - Total: 1,282
  - Density: 0.04563/km^{2} (0.1182/sq mi)
- Demonym: antofagastense
- Postal Code: K4705
- IFAM: CAT004
- Area Code: 03835
- Patron saint: ?
- Website: web.archive.org/web/20061208195352/http://www.camsencat.gov.ar/antofaga.html

Antofagasta de la Sierra is the northernmost department of Catamarca Province in Argentina.

The provincial subdivision has a population of about 1,300 inhabitants in an area of 28,097 km^{2} (10,848 sq mi), and its capital city is Antofagasta de la Sierra.

== Volcanoes ==
The department is most famous for its volcanic activity. There are over 200 volcanos situated in the Antofagasta de la Sierra volcanic field, the most notable of them being Antofalla, Carachipampa, Alumbrera and Galán.

The Galán volcano has the largest explosive caldera in the world.

== Pre-history ==
There is evidence of hunter-gatherer people in the region dating back about 8,000 years. Their diet largely consisted of wild camelid animals. Seeds of amaranth grain dating from 4,500 years ago and evidence—grinding artefacts—that they may have been used as food since 7,000 years ago have been found.
