= Farallón Negro =

Coordinates: 27°18′21″S 66°40′52″W

- Municipality and village
- Interactive map of Farallón Negro
- Country: Argentina
- Province: Catamarca Province
- Time zone: UTC−3 (ART)

Farallón Negro is a village and municipality in Catamarca Province in northwestern Argentina.
