= Laguna Escondida (caldera) =

Caldera in the Andes

Laguna Escondida is a caldera in the Andes.

The area of the Central Andes and the Puna plateau are covered by thick ignimbrite sheets erupted from large volcanoes, starting from 10 mya ago probably in the northern Puna. In the southern segment of the Central Andes, major fault zones are frequently associated with the volcanic centres.

The Laguna Escondida caldera has dimensions of 40 by 16 kilometres (24.9 mi × 9.9 mi) and is associated with the Laguna Amarga caldera and Wheelwright caldera. The caldera formed between 6.5 and 4 mya ago and the 630 cubic kilometres (150 cu mi) Laguna Verde ignimbrite is associated with Laguna Escondida and Laguna Amarga. It post-dates the Laguna Amarga caldera.
