= Wheelwright caldera =

Caldera in Chile

Coordinates: 26°45′00″S 68°37′30″W

Wheelwright caldera is a caldera in Chile. It is variously described as being between 11 kilometres (6.8 mi) and 22 kilometres (14 mi) wide and lies in the Central Volcanic Zone of the Andes. A lake lies within the caldera, which is among the largest of the Central Andes. The caldera lies in the region of Ojos del Salado, the world's tallest volcano.

The caldera formed together with a major ignimbrite known as the Wheelwright ignimbrite, but the exact relationship between the two is not clear as the ignimbrite is not encountered within the caldera. The ignimbrite was emplaced around 6.6 ± 1.2 - 5.5 ± 0.8 million years ago. Later, a number of volcanoes such as Ermitaño and Peñas Blancas were constructed on the ring fault around the caldera, and lava domes developed within its confines.

== Geography and geomorphology ==
It lies in the Andes of the Atacama Region, east of the Salar de Maricunga. The caldera lies just southwest of the Chile-Argentina border, which southeast of the caldera is crossed by the Paso San Francisco. The international road between Chile and Argentina passes south of the caldera complex; the region is remote and often described as inimical to life.

Wheelwright is part of the Central Volcanic Zone, which together with the Northern Volcanic Zone, the Southern Volcanic Zone and the Austral Volcanic Zone is one among four separate volcanic zones in the Andes; these volcanic zones are separated by gaps without recent volcanic activity. Since 23 million years ago the Central Volcanic Zone has given rise to compound volcanoes, calderas and stratovolcanoes, which are formed mainly by andesitic or dacitic rocks. Ojos del Salado, a member of the Central Volcanic Zone, is the second tallest mountain in the Andes and the highest active volcano in the world. Further, the Maricunga volcanic belt in the same region is site of major precious metal deposits.

The caldera is 22 kilometres (14 mi), c. 19 kilometres (12 mi) or 11 kilometres (6.8 mi) wide and 300 metres (980 ft) deep, and is one of the best preserved circular structures of the southern Central Andes, as well as one of its largest. It has also been interpreted as being actually three nested calderas. The Lomas de Montes lie along the northwestern and the Somma de Lars along the southeastern caldera margin. The caldera is filled with sediments as well as a 4.4-4.0 million year old ignimbrite that probably originated in the Laguna Amarga caldera.

The depression of the caldera features a crater lake, called Laguna Wheelwright. It is a saltwater lake with high contents of arsenic and fluorine, thus it is not safe for drinking. Birds and other animals are found at the lake.

Later volcanic centres decorate its rim, including dykes, lava domes like the Domo Eulogio and stratovolcanoes like Ermitaño (6,146 metres (20,164 ft) high), Peñas Blancas complex (6,030 metres (19,780 ft) high) which hosts a parasitic cone Volcán de Inca on its southern flank, the Pircas de Indio (5,886 metres (19,311 ft) high), Pico Wheelwright (5,805 metres (19,045 ft) high) and the Volcan Rex (5,627 metres (18,461 ft) high) summits. These secondary centres are found on the southern side of the caldera, 5,507 metres (18,068 ft) high Lars actually generated its own caldera, and lava flows from these volcanoes entered the Wheelwright caldera depression.

== Geology ==
Off the western coast of South America, the Nazca Plate subducts beneath the South America Plate at a rate of 9–9.3 centimetres per year (3.5–3.7 in/year). This subduction process has been ongoing since the Jurassic.

Neighbouring volcanic centres to Wheelwright include Ojos del Salado farther south. The caldera is set into a terrain formed by volcanic rocks of Miocene-Pliocene age, chiefly lava flows of andesitic-dacitic composition. Together with the neighbouring Laguna Amarga caldera and Laguna Escondida caldera Wheelwright forms an alignment of Miocene-Pliocene calderas; the latter caldera in part overlaps with the Wheelwright caldera.

The region coincides with a lineament of volcanoes which forms the southern margin of the volcanically active Central Andes; south of this margin the Nazca Plate subducts beneath the South America Plate at a shallow angle and Quaternary volcanism is absent.

The oldest outcrops are found in the Cordillera Claudio Gay mountain range just west of Wheelwright; these outcrops are Paleozoic sediments and volcanic rocks. Volcanic arc volcanism has been ongoing in the region since 180 million years ago and migrated eastward during that time, but the modern arc developed 26 million years ago when the Farallon Plate broke up.

== Climate ==
The region is dry, windy and has high insolation. Because of the aridity, even high mountains are not covered with glaciers; Llullaillaco volcano is the highest non-glaciated summit on Earth.

== Eruption history ==
The Wheelwright caldera is the source of the Wheelwright ignimbrite, an andesitic ignimbrite which crops out over a surface of 60 square kilometres (23 sq mi) west of the caldera and was erupted 6.6 ± 1.2 - 5.5 ± 0.8 million years ago. The ignimbrite consists of at least two units which are rich in pumice fragments and lithic components of predominantly volcanic origin. The ignimbrite additionally contains phenocrysts of biotite, clinopyroxene, hornblende and pyroxene within a brown matrix. The Juncalito ignimbrite may be the same ignimbrite as the Wheelwright ignimbrite.

The caldera formed at the same time as the eruption of the ignimbrite, but relation between the two events is unclear; there are no intracaldera exposures of the ignimbrite. Possibly, the caldera was formed by a lateral eruption from a magma chamber. It appears that two separate caldera collapses occurred, one 5 million years ago and the other 4 million years ago. The time of caldera formation was also a time of vigorous volcanic activity in the region, which gave rise to stratovolcanoes as well as the Galán caldera farther east. Locally, the Wheelwright caldera is also related to the neighbouring Laguna Amarga and Laguna Escondida calderas.

The Ermitaño volcano is dated 4.4 - 3.8 million years ago, Peñas Blancas complex formed between 5 and 4.8 million years ago, an unnamed secondary centre 3.9 ± 0.9 million years ago, Pico Wheelwright 5.9 ± 0.9 million years ago, Volcán de Inca 3.3 ± 0.3 million years ago, Volcan Rex erupted 4.9 ± 0.2 million years ago. This stage of volcanic activity was of andesitic to dacitic composition and became more silicic over time. At the closing of this stage, lava domes and associated pyroclastic flows were emplaced within the caldera and across the Cordillera Claudio Gay. Hydrothermal alteration processes gave rise to sulfur deposits.
