= Antofagasta de la Sierra, Catamarca =

Antofagasta de la Sierra
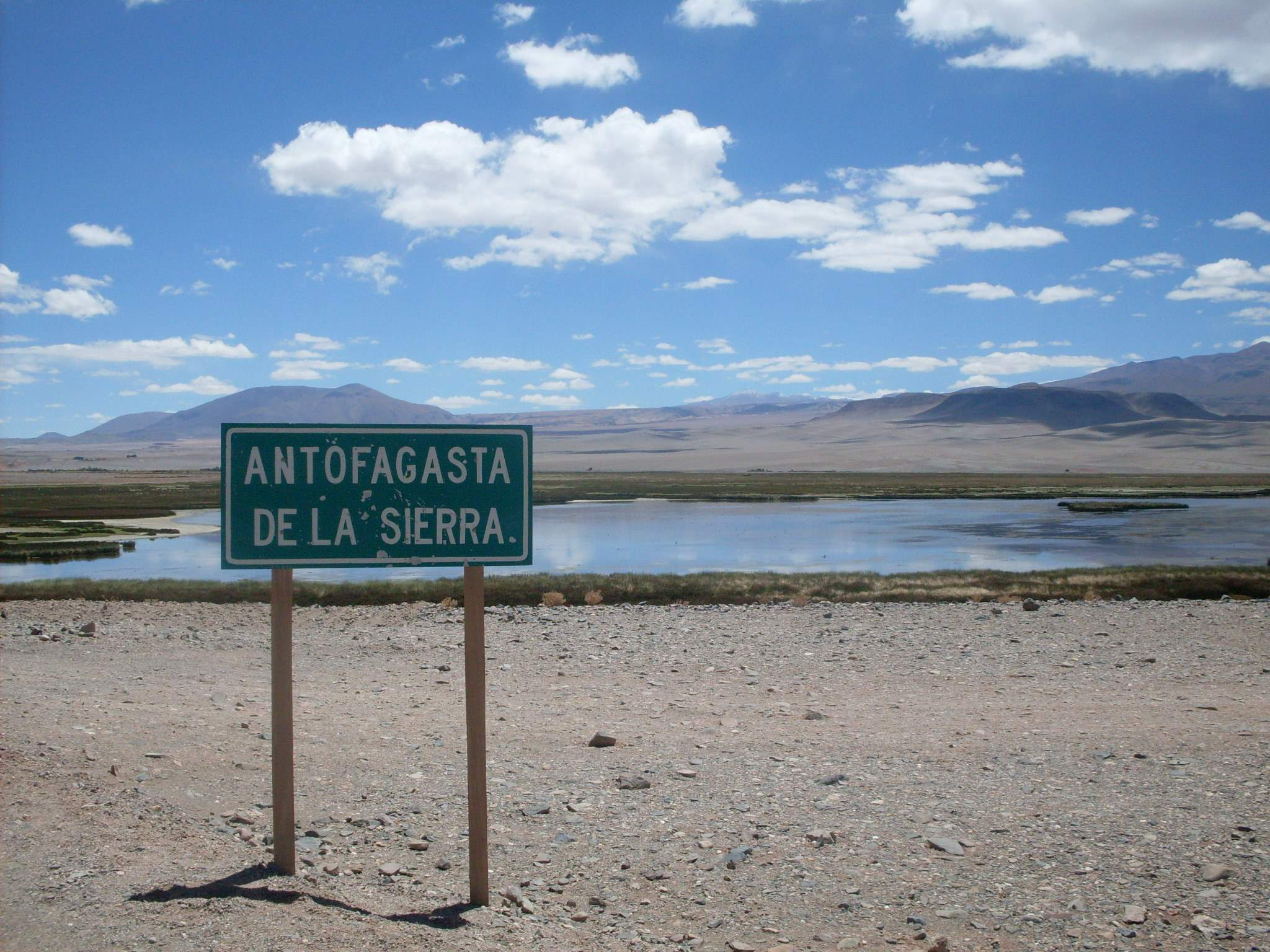

- Location in Argentina
- Coordinates: 26°04′S 67°25′W
- Country: Argentina
- Province: Catamarca
- Department: Antofagasta de la Sierra
- 3rd level Municipality: Antofagasta de la Sierra
- Elevation: 3,320 m (10,890 ft)

Population (2001 census [INDEC])
  - Total: 667
- CPA Base: K 4704
- Area code: +54 3835

Antofagasta de la Sierra is a village in Catamarca Province, Argentina. It is the head town of the Antofagasta de la Sierra Department.

Antofagasta de la Sierra is a high-altitude settlement. The majority of its inhabitants are descended from the Diaguitas and Atacameños.

== Economy ==
The local economy is based on agriculture and farming; the residents keep sheep and llama and grow vegetables. Tourism plays an important part in the local economy as many tourists come to see the nearby mountains, volcanoes and calderas, including Galán caldera and the Antofagasta de la Sierra volcanic field. The village holds an annual Festival of the dead.
