= Cerro El Cóndor =

Mountain in Argentina

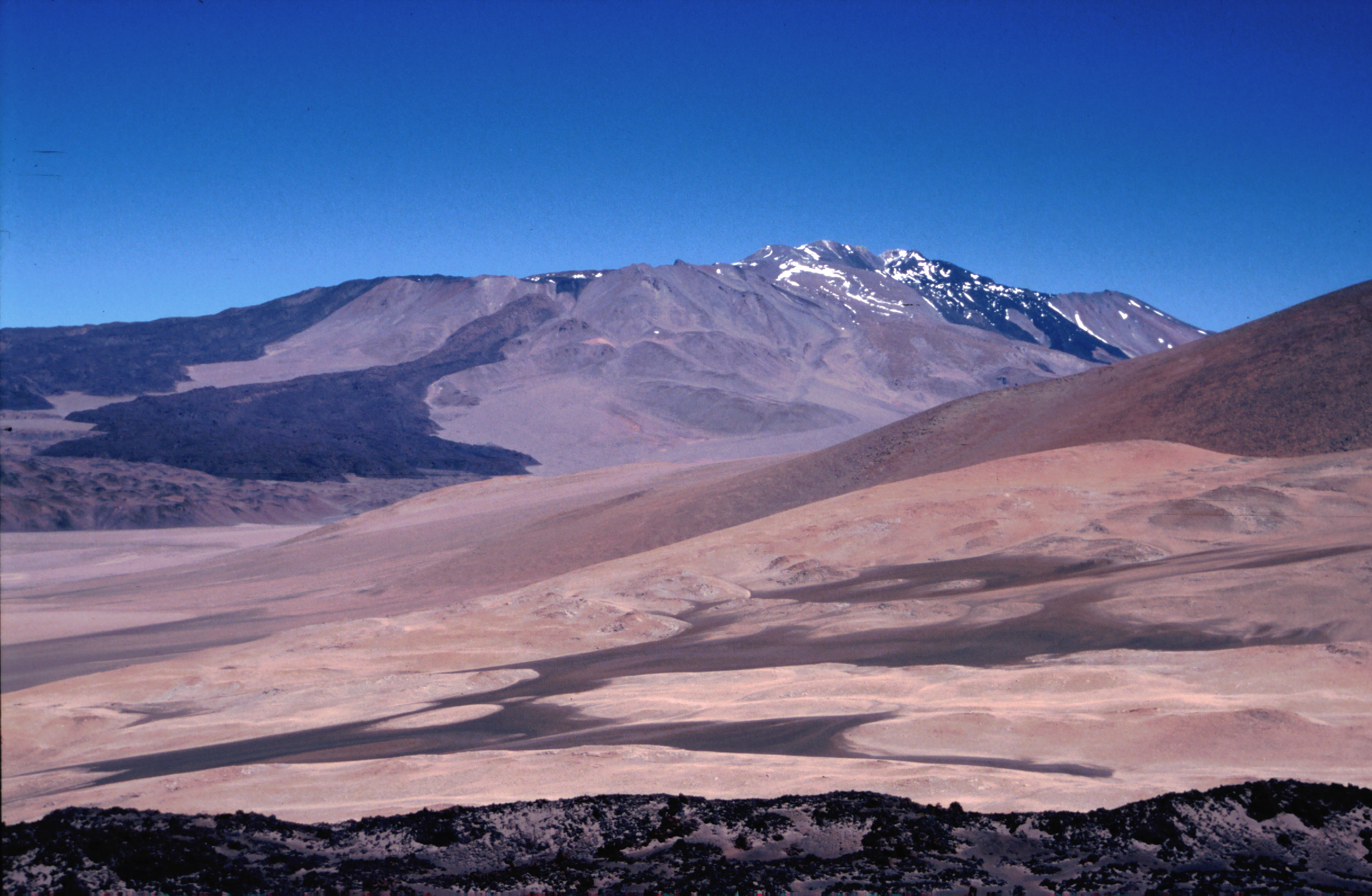
- Cerro El Cóndor from the east

Highest point
- Elevation: 6,414 m (21,043 ft)
- Prominence: 1,660 m (5,450 ft)
- Listing: Ultra
- Coordinates: 26°37′54″S 68°21′42″W

Geography
- Location within Argentina
- Location: Argentina
- Parent range: Andes

Geology
- Rock age: Holocene
- Mountain type: Stratovolcano

Climbing
- First ascent: Henri Barret und Walter Sinay 27. Oktober 1996

Cerro El Cóndor is a stratovolcano in Argentina.

Cerro El Cóndor is a remote peak in the Argentine Puna de Atacama. As such it was probably the last major 6000m+ peak in the Andes to be climbed, with the summit reaching a height of 6,400 metres (21,000 ft). The volcano has the form of a massif (which covers a surface of 281 square kilometres (108 sq mi)) constructed by two separate volcanoes; the older edifice forms parts of the northern and eastern flanks which are cut by scarps interpreted as caldera remnants. The summit region is formed by the newer edifice, and features a series of craters with diameters of 100–350 metres (330–1,150 ft) and a cover of pyroclastic material and scoria. Also part of the newer phase are extensive lava flows which form the western and parts of the eastern and southern slopes and reach distances of 17 kilometres (11 mi) from the summit.

Surrounding volcanoes include Condorito (which is considered to be part of the old El Cóndor volcano), Falso Azufre and Laguna Escondida which have constrained the extent of El Cóndor's lava flows. The volcano rises within the Laguna Amarga caldera, and an older mafic monogenetic volcano lies north of El Cóndor.

Radiometric dating has yielded ages of 2.89 - 2.67 million years ago to 0.13 - 0.02 million years ago, with the volcano developing in two phases. The older group of ages has been obtained on the Condorito and the older edifice, while the ages of 130,000 years ago and younger come from the younger edifice and lava flows; some of these dates have high uncertainties (one young age is 20,000 ± 30,000 years ago from the western flank) and Holocene eruptions in the summit region are possible. Presently, Cóndor is considered to be a dormant volcano with the potential of future activity, and while the remoteness of the volcano reduces any hazard potential future pyroclastic eruptions could impact air traffic over the region and east of it.

Cerro El Cóndor is part of the Central Volcanic Zone of the Andes together with about 110 other Quaternary volcanoes, and lies in the southern sector of the volcanic zone; other volcanic zones in the Andes are the Northern Volcanic Zone, the Southern Volcanic Zone and the Austral Volcanic Zone. The history of volcanic activity is poorly known for most of these volcanoes owing to the lack of dating; only a few historical eruptions have been recorded, such as an eruption at Ojos del Salado in 1993. Satellite images have identified ongoing deformation of El Cóndor.

The volcano has erupted trachyandesite and trachydacite in the later stages of activity, after a stage with andesitic to dacitic eruptions. The rocks define a potassium-rich calc-alkaline suite.

== See also ==
- List of volcanoes in Argentina
- List of mountains in Argentina
- List of mountains in the Andes
- List of Ultras of South America

== Sources ==
- "El Cóndor". Global Volcanism Program. Smithsonian Institution.
- Grosse, Pablo; Orihashi, Yuji; Guzmán, Silvina R.; Sumino, Hirochika; Nagao, Keisuke (1 May 2018). "Eruptive history of Incahuasi, Falso Azufre and El Cóndor Quaternary composite volcanoes, southern Central Andes". Bulletin of Volcanology. 80 (5): 44. Bibcode:2018BVol...80...44G. doi:10.1007/s00445-018-1221-5. hdl:10261/163641. ISSN 0258-8900.
