= Antofagasta de la Sierra =

Volcanic field in Argentina

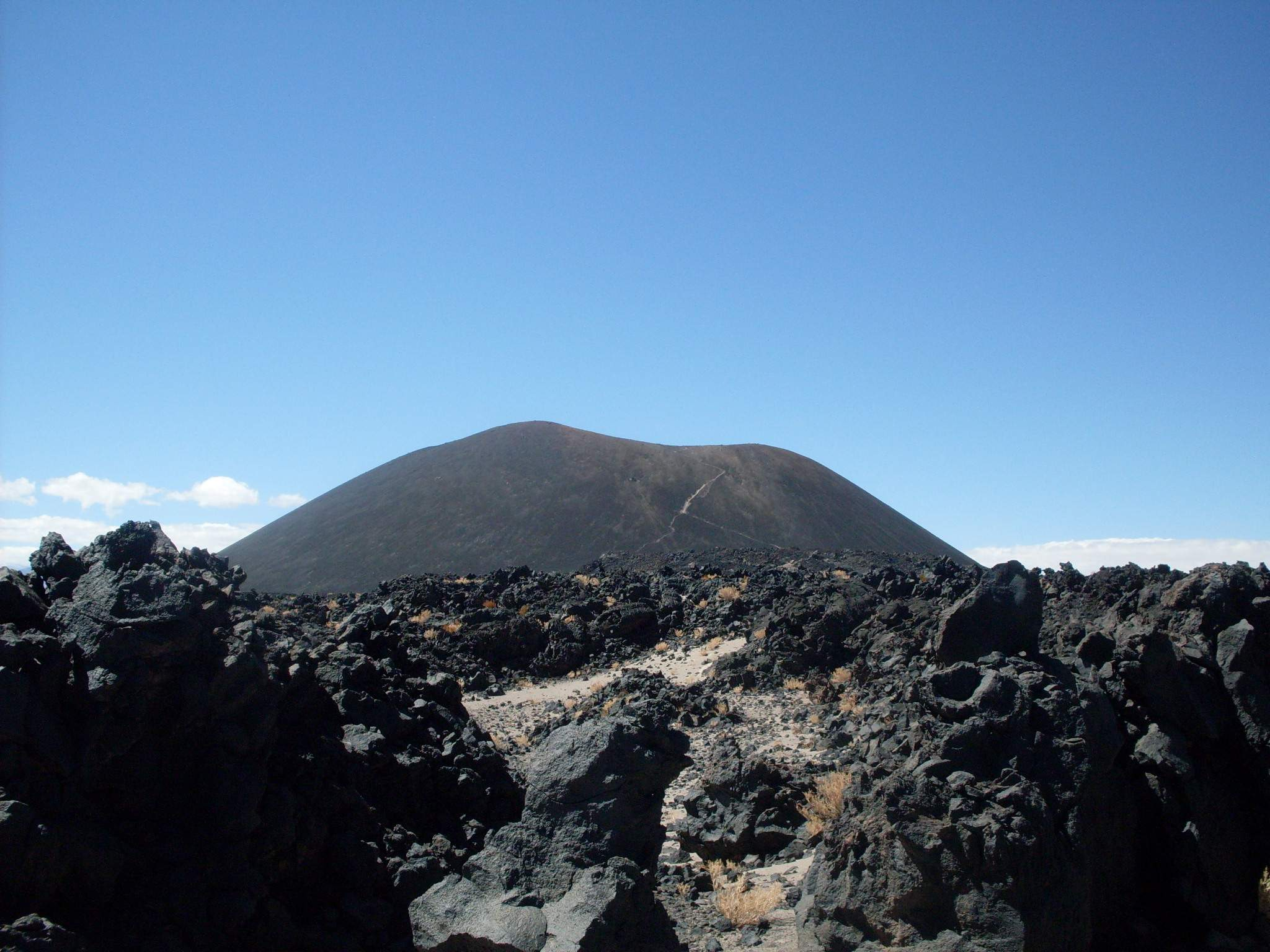
- Alumbrera cinder cone viewed from a lava field

Highest point
- Elevation: 4,000 metres (13,123 ft) (uncertain)
- Coordinates: 26°05′S 67°30′W

Geography
- Location within Argentina
- Location: Argentina
- Parent range: Andes

Geology
- Rock age: Holocene
- Mountain type: Scoria cones
- Last eruption: Unknown

Antofagasta de la Sierra is a volcanic field in Argentina. The main type of volcanic edifice in the area are scoria cones, formed by the La Laguna, Jote and Alumbrera volcanoes. The first and last of these form a sub-group which is better researched. Various dating methods have yielded ages from several million to several hundred thousand years ago, but some vents appear to be of Holocene age.

== Geology ==
=== Regional ===
Volcanic activity in the Andes occurs in four regions: the Northern Volcanic Zone, the Central Volcanic Zone, the Southern Volcanic Zone and the Austral Volcanic Zone. The first three of these are found where the Nazca Plate subducts beneath the South America Plate, while the last zone occurs at the subduction zone of the Antarctic Plate. The Andean Central Volcanic Zone runs along the Western Cordillera of the Andes and along the Altiplano. During the Neogene, the position of this volcanic arc moved eastward and the arc became broader, probably due to a change in the tilt of the slab of the Nazca Plate. Volcanic activity during this time was heavily influenced by local strike-slip faults which acted to channel the magma flows. About 7 million years ago, tectonics and volcanic activity changed in the region, probably in response to the delamination of the crust beneath the region: large scale ignimbrites erupted at Galán and small back-arc volcanoes erupted mafic basaltic andesite lavas. These small volcanic centres consist of lava domes, lava flows, maars, scoria cones and tuff rings.

=== Local ===
The Antofagasta de la Sierra volcanic field lies within the north–south trending tectonic depression of the same name, in the Catamarca Province. Of the individual vents, the La Laguna and Alumbrera cones are the best studied ones; they lie about 5–7 kilometres (3.1–4.3 mi) south of Antofagasta de la Sierra. These volcanoes are associated with black lava flow fields. The Jote volcanoes consist of a cluster of cinder cones and lava flows and are located south of the Antofagasta de la Sierra lake. To their northwest lies Cachamani.

Alumbrera cone is 164 metres (538 ft) high and has an elliptical shape with a maximum length of 1.3 kilometres (0.81 mi), probably due to wind influencing the growth of the cone. The cone shows signs of having been gravitationally unstable, including a sector collapse on its northwestern flank. The cone has a 50-metre (160 ft) wide crater and a few fissure vents. Alumbrera has a volume of 0.12 cubic kilometres (0.029 cu mi) and is the source of a 0.29-cubic-kilometre (0.070 cu mi) large lava flow field which covers a surface of 41.3 square kilometres (15.9 sq mi) and surrounds the Alumbrera cone. Lapilli fill the crater of Alumbrera, which has alum, ochre and sulfur colours.

La Laguna is smaller than Alumbrera: The cone is only 153 metres (502 ft) high and 1.1 kilometres (0.68 mi) wide, with a 23.5-metre (77 ft) deep crater. As with Alumbrera La Laguna features one fissure vent and a lava flow field, with a smaller volume of 0.12 cubic kilometres (0.029 cu mi) and surface area of 6.8 square kilometres (2.6 sq mi).

Both La Laguna and Alumbrera were fed by northwest-striking fissures, which is unusual as most lineaments in the area strike northeastwards or north–south. The surfaces of erupted rocks have been subject to various degrees of wind-driven erosion which has left grooves in the most altered units. Most likely the magma supply at these two vents was so large that the rising dykes were able to force pre-existent lineaments open and to pass through them.

=== Composition ===
Alumbrera and La Laguna has erupted alkaline to sub-alkaline basaltic trachyandesite to trachybasalt with a porphyritic texture. Phenocrysts within the rock include olivine and plagioclase or clinopyroxene, which form also the bulk of the matrix. The Jote lavas have similar composition to the La Laguna rocks. The chemical composition of the old and the new La Laguna volcanoes is different, with the old lavas showing a more volcanic arc-like composition. Various minerals, including "alum" (in reality a mixture of aluminium sulfate and magnesium sulfate) found at Alumbrera, were mined by the local population.

== Eruptive history ==
Eruptions at Alumbrera occurred in two phases; the first formed toothpaste lava and ʻaʻā lava and the second in addition to lava small pyroclastic flows and a tephra blanket. A scoria fallout is found as far as 15 kilometres (9.3 mi) east of Alumbrera. During this second phase, the sector collapse at Alumbrera occurred and was followed by the emission of lava bombs during Strombolian eruptions. La Laguna at first erupted several now heavily eroded lava flows and formed an old cone. Later during a second phase of activity lava bombs and scoria formed a newer cone and two lava flow fields. At both volcanoes, phreatomagmatic activity may have occurred after the magma pressure dropped so far that water could enter the conduit. The eruptions probably lasted several weeks to several years.

A lava flow at La Laguna cone has been dated to 340,000 ± 60,000 years before present, consistent with its older appearance. A large-scale research project in the Puna yielded a number of Ar-Ar and K-Ar dates, including 3.2 and 4.5 million years ago for Jote and 0.3 and 7.3 million years ago for Alumbrera and La Laguna. The older age appears to refer to a mesa just west of the Alumbrera lava field. The youngest age was obtained on Alumbrera cone by argon-argon dating: 37,000 ± 2,000.

Historical activity is unknown, and Lorenzo Sundt in 1911 reported that there was no sign of activity. In 1907 the volcanoes were considered to be extinct, but the field may have had eruptions during the Holocene; the young appearance of Alumbrera suggests a Holocene age for this cone. Renewed activity in the field could cause ash to fall over hundreds of square kilometres of adjoining land and generate dangerous pyroclastic density currents close to the vent.

== Other ==
Between the Antofagasta and Alumbrera volcanoes lies the Antofagasta lake. The vegetation in the area is shrub steppe, and fairly sunny and dry. The Antofagasta River coming from the north forms a large wetland before the relatively deep Antofagasta lake; the Alumbrera volcano borders the lake in the south. The lake in 1911 consisted of two halves, joined by a canal. Before the emplacement of the volcanic field, which dammed the lake, the river may have continued south to Carachipampa. A major archaeological site is emplaced on the Antofagasta volcano.

== Gallery ==
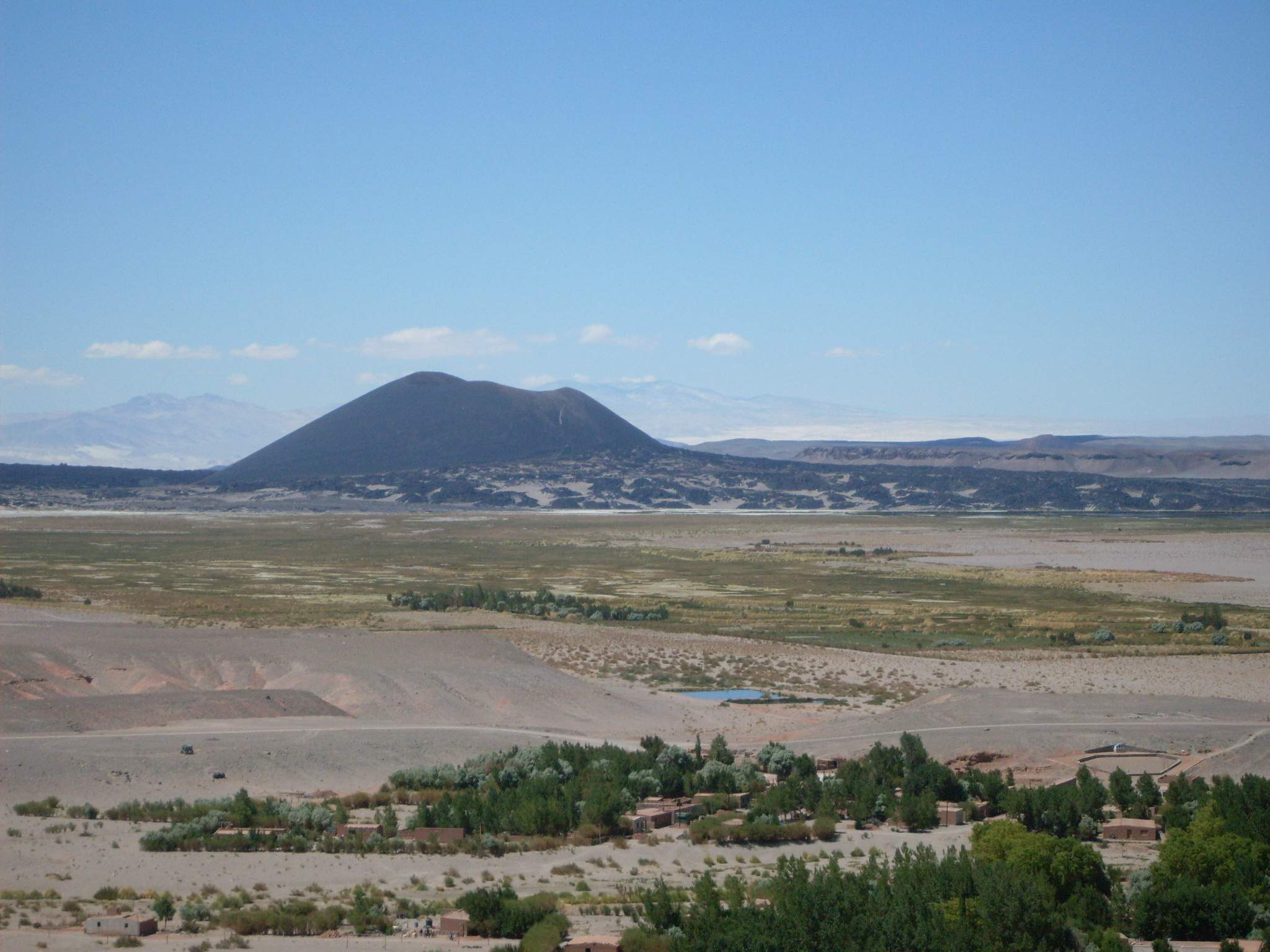
Antofagasta cone from the town

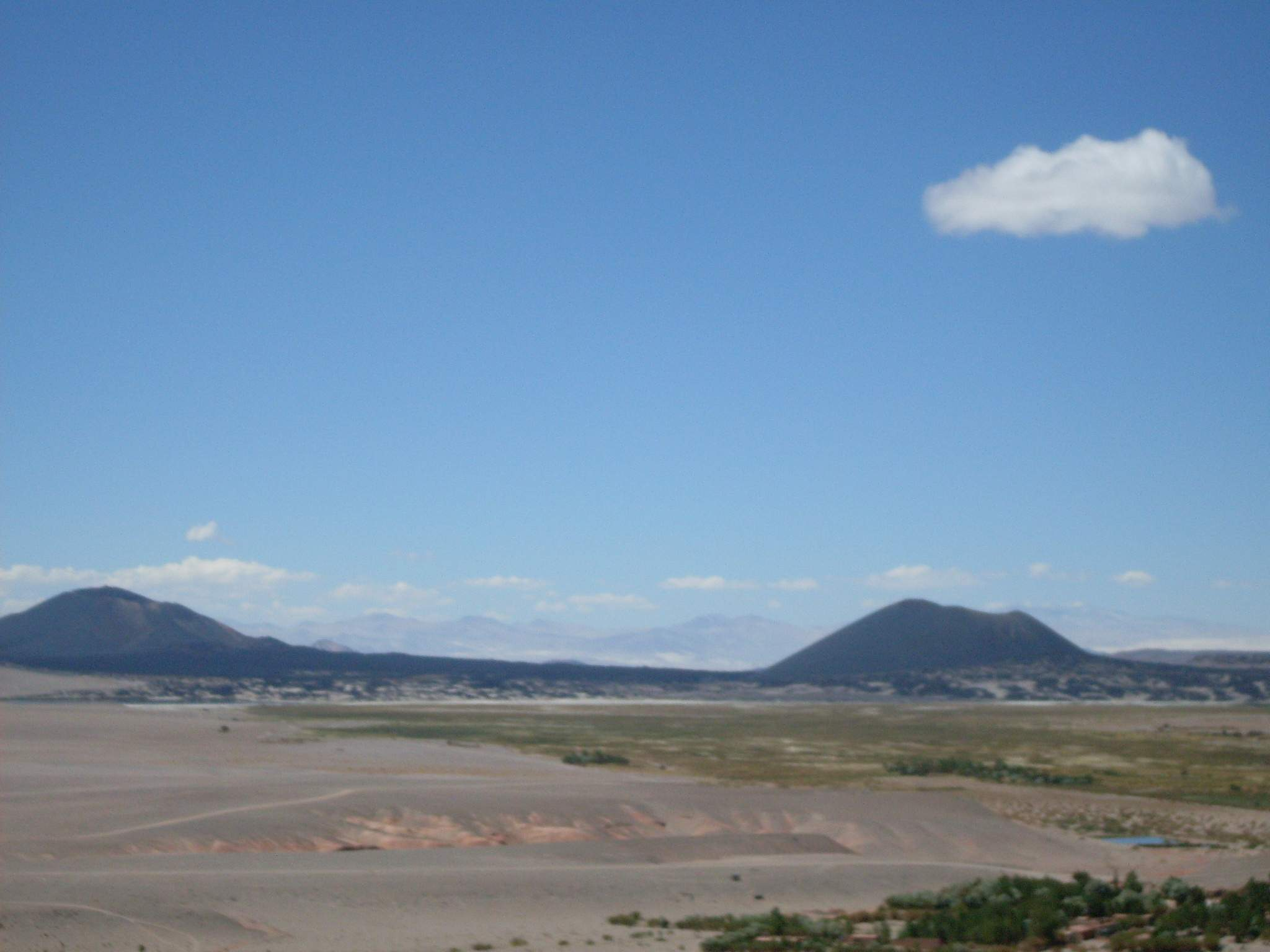
Alumbrera and Antofagasta cones

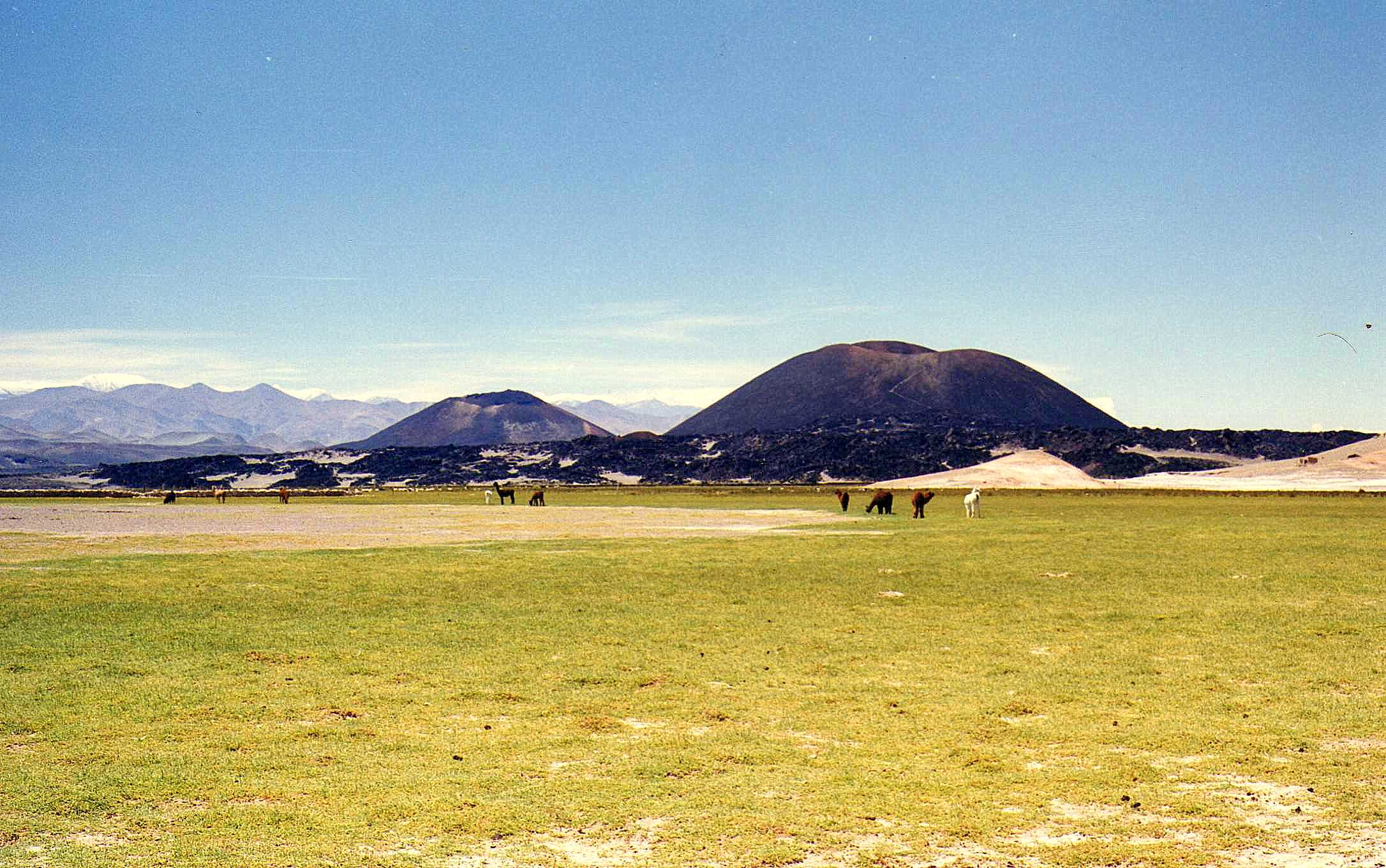

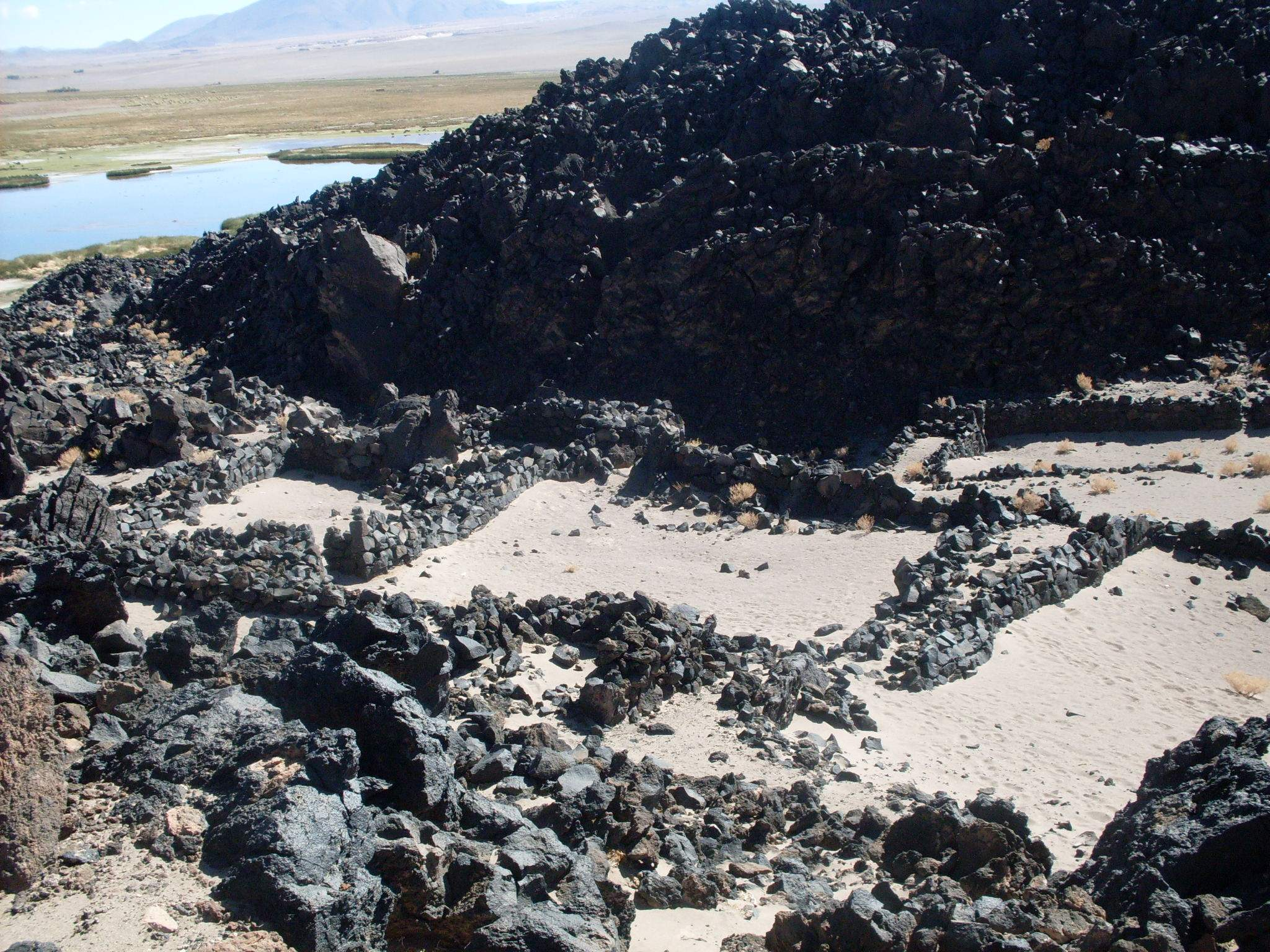
A pucara close to the volcanoes

== See also ==
- List of volcanoes in Argentina
- Carachipampa
- List of volcanic fields
