= Nevado de Acay =

Mountain in Argentina

Coordinates: 24°25′S 66°10′W

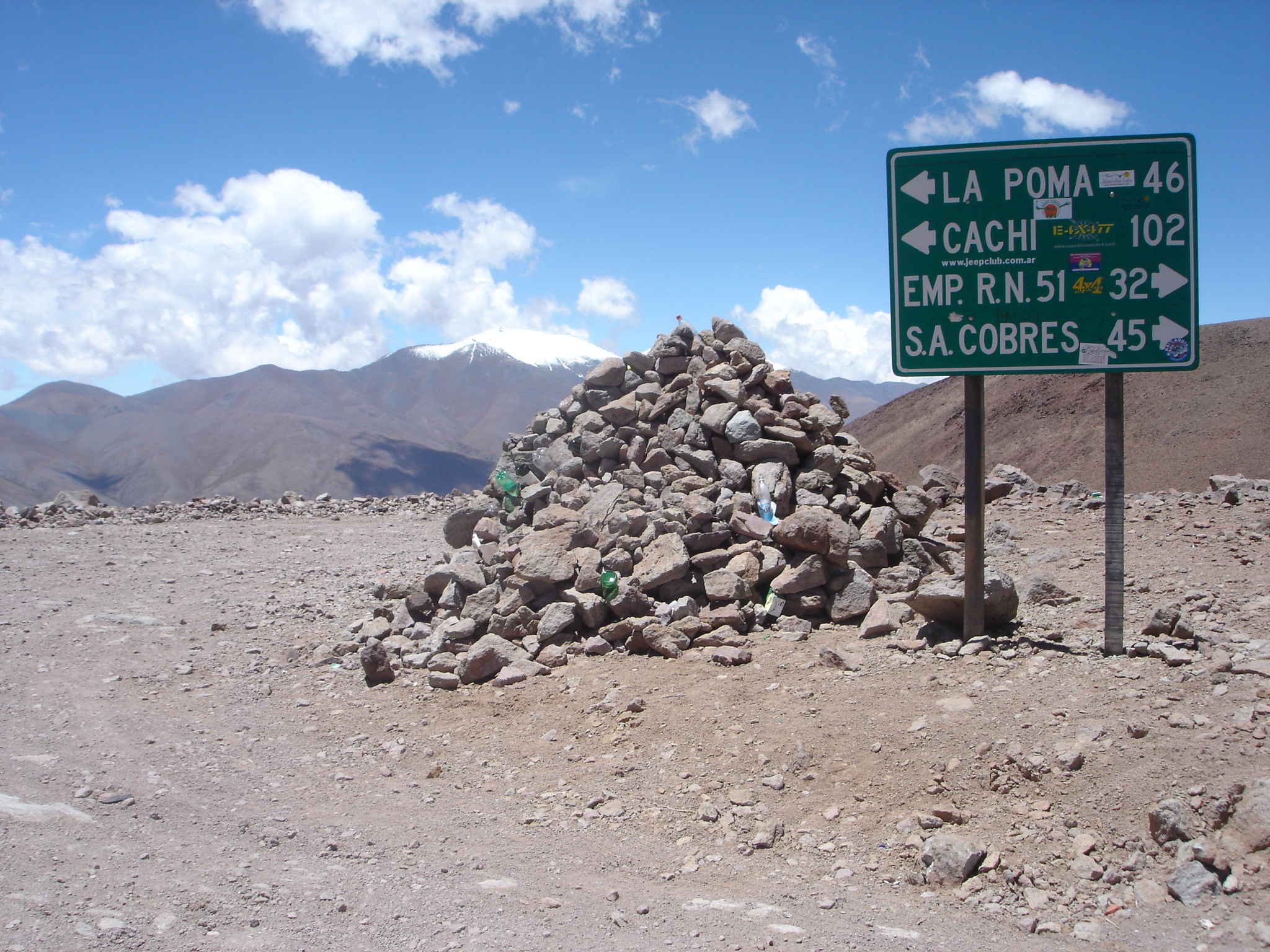
Nevado de Acay from Abra de Acay

Nevado de Acay is a 5,950-metre-high (19,520 ft) mountain in Argentina. It is a volcanic intrusion that formed during the Miocene and was later exposed. The intrusion is formed by monzonite and is associated with a fault system that also connects to neighbouring volcanoes.

While not presently glaciated, it contains a seasonal snowpack and is the source of several streams and rivers, including the Rio Salado. A number of archaeological sites have been found on Nevado de Acay and mining activity occurred there until recent times.

== Geology ==
Nevado de Acay is 5,716 metres (18,753 ft), 5,886 metres (19,311 ft) or 5,950 metres (19,520 ft) high. It lies in the La Poma Department of Argentina's Salta Province. It is part of the Cuesta del Acay mountains and their highest summit. The Calchaqui valley extends south from Nevado de Acay.

It is formed by monzonite that was generated 12.6 ± 0.3 million years ago, along the Calchaqui fault. It originally formed as an intrusion that was exposed about 12.61 ± 0.25 million years ago. Another date is 26 million years ago, which would make it contemporaneous with the disintegration of the Farallon Plate and the following increase in subduction and volcanic activity. Yet another older date is 18.9 million years ago.

Emplaced within the Precambrian-Cambrian Puncoviscana formation, the Nevado de Acay monzonite contains biotite, diorite, hornblende, magnetite, monzodiorite, pyroxene, titanite and tonalite. Skarn and mineral deposits formed within the monzonite as well.

Located close to the Negra Muerta volcanic complex, it is a volcanic system associated with the Calama-Olacapato-El Toro fault system. Other volcanoes such as Aguas Calientes and Incahuasi Sur are associated with this fault system.

Cirques indicate the presence of former glaciers. The present-day snowline lies at an altitude of 5,800 metres (19,000 ft); rock glaciers fed by avalanches exist on Nevado de Acay in Pleistocene glacier valleys. Nevado de Acay is covered in snow only during the winter months, although summer storms can also deposit snow on it; during the dry season the mountain is bare.

The Calchaqui River originates on Nevado de Acay and flows south, as does the Rio Juramento. Other waterbodies originating on Nevado de Acay are the Arroyo Pircas, a tributary to the Rio Juramento, Arroyo Tastil which flows into Arroyo del Toro, which also originates on Nevado de Acay and eventually flows into the Arroyo Arias; Arroyo Arias in turn also drains into the Juramento. Most streams in the area are fed with meltwater. The mountains form the drainage divide; water flowing to the west eventually ends up in various endorheic basins. The Rio Los Patos also originates on Nevado de Acay and archeological sites are found on its river terraces, and it converges with the Rio San Antonio de los Cobres, which likewise originates on Nevado de Acay as Rio Organullo and after passing close to San Antonio del los Cobres and receiving the Quebrada Potrerillos carries the name of the town, and eventually reach Salinas Grandes where they evaporate.

== Biology ==
Liolaemus multicolor, an iguanid lizard, has been found on Nevado de Acay. Endorheic basins in the valleys on Nevado de Acay were an important resource for the Las Cuevas V archeological site, which belongs to a cultural horizont between 600 BC - 400 AD.

== Human activities ==
Map of mines in a 1907 sketch

Nevado de Acay is the site of an Inka mountain sanctuary. A summit sanctuary was discovered in 2000; later two additional sites were discovered on the subsidiary summits Blanca and Navaja. Some historical references to the mountain indicate that it was the connection between the Inka province Chicoana and the Puna, although the Abra del Acay is not the only place to which these historical records may refer. The present day National Route 40 passes close to the mountain.

The mountaintop was not the sole site of human activity at Nevado de Acay; traces of mining and pastoral activity among others has been found lower on its slopes as well. At least 53 structures have been identified at elevations between 4,500–5,000 metres (14,800–16,400 ft). Historical records exist of a site named "San Bernardo de Acay" south of Nevado de Acay. The archeological structures of Nevado de Acay are still only incompletely understood.

Some of these mines reported in 1907 are known as "Flor de Desierto", "Protectora", "Resurreccion" and "Saturno" - the last owner of these mines obtained them in 1924. Mining activity including gold and silver is reported to have occurred in the area during the time of Spanish rule and ended only during the 1656 rebellion of Pedro Bohórquez; the Spanish efforts on these mines may have been the reason why the rebellion occurred in the region. Later an iron mine was active on the northern slope but it is now abandoned. Obsidian outcrops have been observed in the area.
