= Tocomar =

Volcano in Jujuy Province, Argentina

- Location within Argentina

Highest point
- Coordinates: 24°10′S 66°34′W

Geology
- Rock age: Pleistocene
- Mountain type: Volcano

Tocomar is a Pleistocene volcano in the Jujuy Province, Argentina. It is part of the Andean Volcanic Belt, more specifically to its sub-belt the Central Volcanic Zone. The Central Volcanic Zone consists of about 44 active volcanoes and large calderas of the Altiplano-Puna volcanic complex. Volcanism there is caused by the subduction of the Nazca Plate beneath the South America Plate in the Peru-Chile Trench. At Tocomar, volcanism is further influenced by a large fault zone, the Calama-Olacapato-El Toro fault, which runs diagonally across the volcanic arc.

Tocomar has generated several pyroclastic flows during the Pleistocene as well as phreatic-phreatomagmatic activity, and a magma chamber may still exist beneath the volcano. Hot springs are found at the volcanic centre and have been prospected for the generation of geothermal power; the water discharged by the springs eventually forms the Tocomar river. Wetlands are found in the area. Other than this, Tocomar was used as a source of obsidian in antiquity and more recently as a candidate site for a gamma ray observatory and as a mine.

== Geography and geomorphology ==
Tocomar lies in northwestern Argentina, 35 kilometres (22 mi) away from the town of San Antonio de los Cobres in the Jujuy Province and in proximity to the border with the Salta Province farther south. The area is part of the Puna, a high plateau of the Andes which formed starting in the Eocene and whose margins are formed by the Eastern Cordillera and the volcanic Western Cordillera. The Salta-Antofagasta railway and National Route 51 pass close to the volcanic field.

Tocomar is located at 4,388 metres (14,396 ft) elevation within a northwestward draining valley. In this valley, pyroclastic flow and pyroclastic surge deposits crop out on the valley floor and parts of its slopes. In the northwestern and southeastern segments of the field, two vents can be recognized and are associated with springs. An obsidian lava dome marks one of the vents; aside from vents and dome the pyroclastic deposit forms most of this volcano.

Hot springs are found at Tocomar and their activity has generated travertine deposits on the field, including at Baños de Tocomar where silica and sulfur accumulations can be found. The travertines have fibrous, filamentous, granular and lamellar appearances. The temperature of the water is about 80 °C (176 °F) and the waters are salty. Pits interpreted as having formed during hydrothermal explosions are also found. The springs are mostly found where the terrain has been incised by valleys. Electrical resistivity has been used to infer the structure of the geothermal reservoir beneath Tocomar, which is mostly located within an Ordovician basement; the temperatures of the reservoir have been estimated to be 131–235 °C (268–455 °F) at depth. The water appears to be precipitation water that infiltrates terrain south of Tocomar, at elevations of 4,900–5,000 metres (16,100–16,400 ft). After being heated by the deep geothermal system, the water seems to interact with another shallower aquifer before emerging in the springs.

Tocomar has been investigated for the potential to generate geothermal power. (Note: Conditions would be favourable in the area as there are mines and towns that could use the electricity in the area, as well as a major power line between Chile and Argentina.) Exploration of the Tocomar-Cerro Tuzgle area ceased after a few wells were drilled and ended up being unproductive but has been reinitiated.

== Geology ==
=== Background ===
Tocomar is part of the Andean Volcanic Belt's Central Volcanic Zone, (Note: Off the western coast of South America, the Nazca Plate and the Antarctic Plate subduct beneath the South America Plate, at a rate of 7–9 centimetres per year (2.8–3.5 in/year) and 2 centimetres per year (0.79 in/year) respectively. This process of subduction has generated the Andes as well as the Andean Volcanic Belt. This volcanic belt is subdivided into four segments, from north to south the Northern Volcanic Zone, the Central Volcanic Zone, the Southern Volcanic Zone and the Austral Volcanic Zone.) which runs along the western margin of South America and lies in the countries of Peru, Bolivia, Chile and Argentina. The Central Volcanic Zone features about 44 active volcanoes as well as several large ignimbrite caldera systems; some of these are part of the Altiplano-Puna volcanic complex. (Note: Among the volcanoes of the Central Volcanic Zone is Ojos del Salado, the highest volcano in the world. The largest historical eruption of the Andes took place in the Central Volcanic Zone, in 1600 when Huaynaputina erupted in Peru. This eruption reached class 6 in the volcanic explosivity index and caused 1500 direct fatalities and likely global climate effects. Presently, Lascar in Chile is the most active volcano of the Central Volcanic Zone.) About 200 of all volcanoes in the Andes have been active during the Holocene, 66 of these in historical times. (Note: Volcanic activity in the Andes is ongoing since the Jurassic. During the late Oligocene, the breakup of the Farallon Plate was accompanied by an increase of volcanic activity all along the Andes and tectonic extension in the southern Central Andes. There, this tectonic process caused the formation of tectonic basins from the forearc region into Argentina. In a separate process, large scale delamination of the lower crust triggered uplift of the Puna plateau and intense ignimbrite volcanism on it.) The date of the last eruption of Tocomar is not known with certainty but was in the Pleistocene.

Aside from the regular volcanic arc, volcanoes aligned along west-northwest to east-southeast lineaments are also part of the Central Volcanic Zone. (Note: A number of theories have been proposed to explain why the volcanism occurs along such lineaments, but the specific reasons are still cause of controversy. One of these theories posit that the crust was extended in north-south direction perpendicularly to the faults. These lineaments include the Calama-Olacapato-El Toro fault, which cuts the entire width from the forearc to the foreland in Argentina along which volcanoes formed during the Miocene to Pleistocene; in total about 22 volcanoes are linked to this fault, starting from the 10.5 million years old Incahuasi Sur volcano to the pluton of Las Burras.)

=== Local ===
At Tocomar, the Calama-Olacapato-El Toro fault is subdivided into two subsidiary faults called Incachule and Chorrillos, which in turn are connected by a number of normal faults that give the whole are a complex faulting scheme. These normal faults are associated with the Tocomar vents, and deformation of the eruption deposits indicates that some of the faults were active just as eruptions occurred; it is likely that eruptions were triggered by movement along these faults. These faults also control where geothermal spring activity occurs, but whether the faults themselves were active in the Quaternary is unclear; microseismic activity is still ongoing.

The Tocomar volcano was constructed atop the ignimbrites from the Aguas Calientes caldera, as well as Pleistocene sediments which display traces of earthquake activity and form an alluvial cone. The area is a former basin now filled with volcanic and sedimentary rocks. The oldest outcropping basement in the region is the Precambrian Puncoviscana Formation east of Tocomar, in the San Antonio de los Cobres ridge. Other volcanoes in the region are Cerro Tuzgle and two maars due north, Negro de Chorrillos and San Jéronimo due east and the Aguas Calientes caldera due south; the last two are located fairly close to Tocomar. These volcanoes were active roughly in reverse order, with Aguas Calientes active between 11 and 10 million years ago, while the other centers are of Quaternary age.

=== Composition ===
The Tocomar centre has erupted rhyolitic ignimbrites, which belong to the potassium-rich peraluminous calc-alkaline magmatic series. It does not contain many crystals, which are formed by biotite, plagioclase and quartz.

== Climate, hydrology and vegetation ==
The region is sunny, dry, windy, cold and has a high difference between daytime and nighttime temperature. Average precipitation is less than 100 millimetres per year (3.9 in/year) mostly during summer; consequently Tocomar has an arid climate. The region was warmer and even drier in the past during the early Holocene, but Tocomar was paradoxically wetter.

Springs give source to several permanent rivers in the region, which flow in deep valleys. Among these rivers is the Tocomar river, which after originating in a wetland receives the water from the Tocomar geothermal field and eventually ends in the Salar de Cauchari.

Much of the area around Tocomar has no vegetation. Of the plants that grow in the region, vegetation in the Puna occurs in the form of grass and shrub steppe. Because of the dry climate, wetlands are highly important for the regional biota and feature a characteristic biota. They have a different flora; 25 species have been identified in the Tocomar wetland. Green algae form mats close to the warm springs, which are also colonized by blue-green algae.

Among the animals of the area are camelids such as the guanaco and the vicuña, rodents like the chinchilla and viscacha, the cervid taruca, 20 species of birds including the iconic flamingos and the Andean toad Rhinella spinulosa, which lives in high altitude wetlands. Other animals found in the wetlands are amphipods such as Hyalella and leeches, among other aquatic macroinvertebrates. During the mid-Holocene dry period the wetlands of Tocomar may further have offered a refuge for local humans.

== Eruptive history ==
Between 1,150,000 ± 300,000 and 550,000 ± 100,000, the "Tocomar ignimbrite" was emplaced in the area. It consists of several different units of pyroclastic material, which cover a surface of about 50 square kilometres (19 sq mi). It is likely that geothermal activity was occurring at Tocomar prior to the emplacement of these ignimbrites; geothermally altered material was ejected during the eruptions.

The eruption process has been reconstructed with the aid of the volcanic deposits. A first eruptive episode was phreatomagmatic and generated a low eruption column which in turn gave rise to pyroclastic flows and pyroclastic surges, which were heavily influenced by the topography as they propagated and then came to rest, giving rise to several geological units which are each 5–10 metres (16–33 ft) thick. These units include a lithic unit formed by pre-existent country rock which overlies other units and is sometimes embedded into them as lens-like forms, and a pumice fall deposit that has undergone hydrothermal alteration and fluvial erosion in part. At least three lapilli tuff units are present, the thickest of which has a massive structure and reaches a thickness of 3.5 metres (11 ft). An obsidian containing facies is found inside of one vent of the volcano. In addition to these three primary lapilli tuff units, a secondary unit is exposed in some parts of the volcano and was emplaced during a later stage of volcanic activity. The secondary unit is about 3–15 metres (9.8–49.2 ft) thick and consists of blocks embedded within a matrix formed by lapilli. This second eruption was phreatic and took place a while after the first one; it was probably caused by the interaction of rhyolitic magma with the old geothermal system, and triggered by movement along the local faults.

Travertine deposition took place during the Holocene and Pleistocene when the climate was wetter, in particular between 161,000 and 126,000 years ago. Some volcanic and neotectonic activity took place at the same time. Gravimetric anomalies, the presence of magmatic water in the springs and their high temperatures of about 80 °C (176 °F) indicate that a magma chamber still exists beneath Tocomar.

== Human use ==
Indigenous people of the region obtained obsidian at Tocomar and other sites of the region. Tocomar itself was not a major obsidian source however; other sites in the region were far more important.

In modern times, Tocomar has been investigated as a candidate site for a gamma ray observatory in Argentina. The existence of a kaolin mine in the area was reported in 1993.
