= Cerro Tuzgle =

Stratovolcano in Argentina

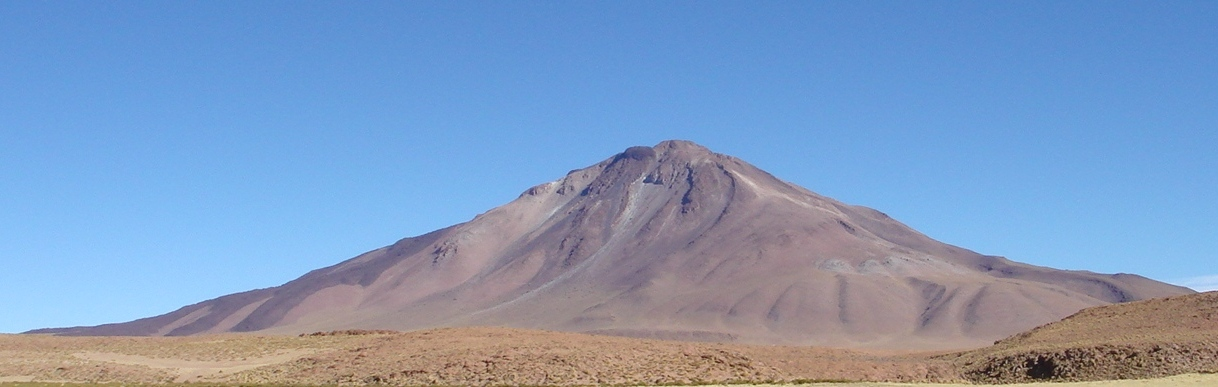
- View of Cerro Tuzgle from the southeast

Highest point
- Elevation: 5,486 m (17,999 ft)
- Coordinates: 24.05°S 66.48°W

Geography
- Location within Argentina

Cerro Tuzgle (Spanish pronunciation: [ˈse.ro ˈtus.ɡle]) is a dormant stratovolcano in the Susques Department of Jujuy Province in northwestern Argentina. Tuzgle is a prominent volcano of the back arc of the Andes and lies about 280 kilometres (170 mi) east of the main volcanic arc. Part of the Central Volcanic Zone of the Andes, its summit is 5,486 metres (17,999 ft) above sea level and it grew during different stages over a caldera and lava domes. Some major lava flows emanate from the summit crater, and one confirmed and one possible flank collapse unit as well as an ignimbrite sheet are associated with Tuzgle.

The first volcanic activity at Tuzgle occurred 650,000 years ago and formed the Tuzgle Ignimbrite. Subsequently, lava domes and several lava flows were erupted; scientists have proposed two different schemes of naming the units. The most recent lava flows are dated at 300,000 years ago and volcanic activity may have continued into the Holocene. (Note: The time period between 11,700 years ago and today.) Several thermal springs are associated with the volcano, and some have been investigated for possible geothermal energy production. Sulfur was formerly mined on the mountain.

== Geography and geomorphology ==
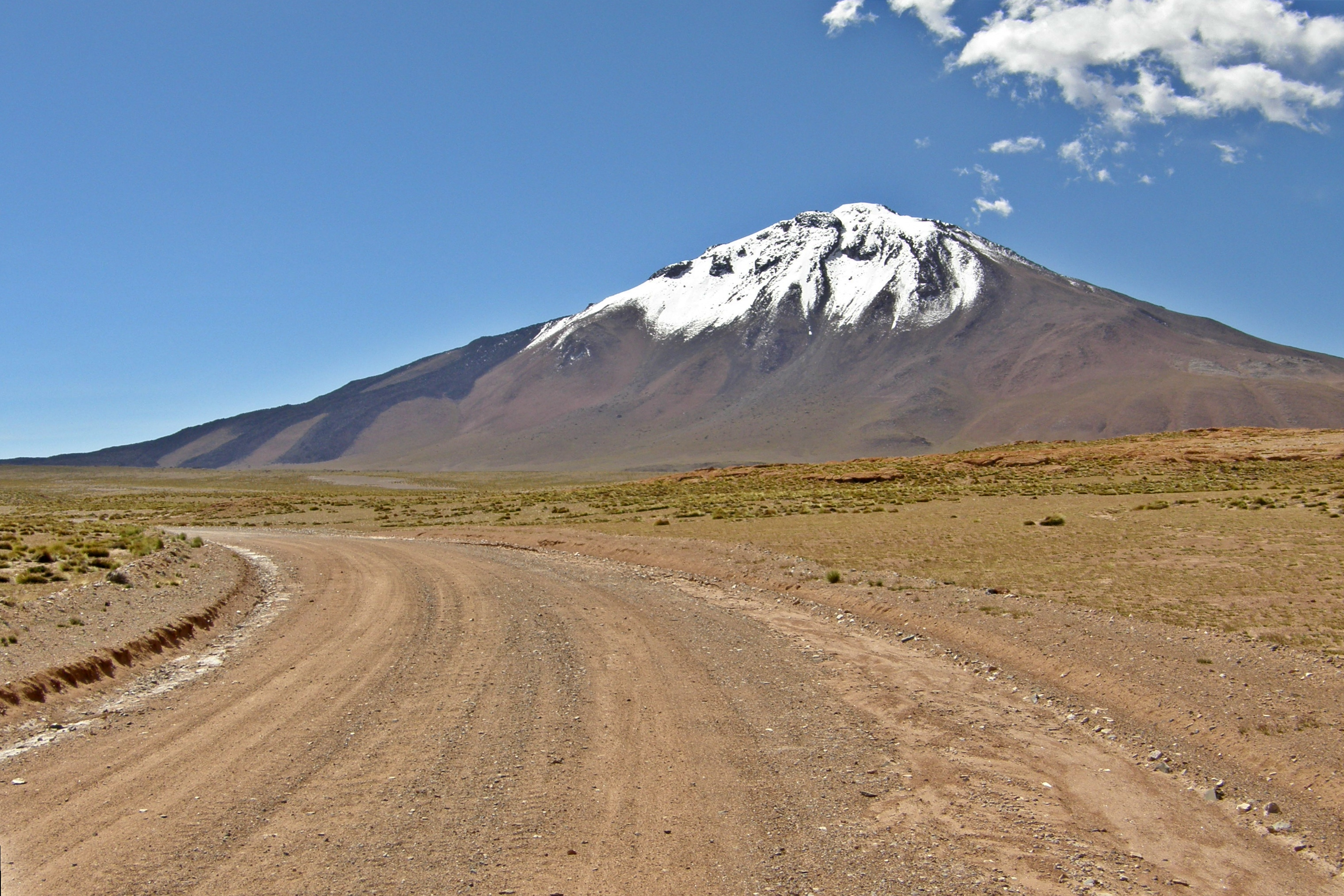
A snow-covered Cerro Tuzgle viewed from National Route 40

Cerro Tuzgle is a volcano near the eastern border of the Argentina Puna. Politically, it is part of the Susques Department of the Jujuy Province. San Antonio de los Cobres lies 45 km (28 miles) from Cerro Tuzgle and Susques 75 km (47 miles), while the cities of Salta and San Salvador de Jujuy are 280 km (170 miles) and 170 km (110 miles) away, respectively. A locality called "Sey" lies northwest of Cerro Tuzgle. The volcano is visible from Provincial Route 74. Its name, which is also rendered as Tujle, Tugle or Tugler, comes from the Kunza language; it means "knoll" and refers to the shape of the volcano.

Cerro Tuzgle is a simple volcanic cone and is the largest in the back-arc region of the Andes. It is a well-preserved stratovolcano that rises 1.2 km (0.75 miles) from a surrounding terrain at c. 3.7 km (2.3 miles) elevation to a summit at 5,486 metres (17,999 ft) elevation. A 0.5-square-kilometre (0.19 sq mi) platform lies at the summit of the volcano. The mountain is occasionally snow-covered and frost weathering has produced patterned ground and blockfields. In 1926 it was reported that a crater lake lies on the summit.

Three east-west trending fissure vents in the summit area are the source of dark lava flows that flowed southward and southwestward, and are flanked by 1–2-metre (3 ft 3 in – 6 ft 7 in) high scoria ridges. The lava flows that make up the volcanic cone are blocky, rich in crystals and have variable appearances. Numerous young-looking lava flows descend the slopes of Cerro Tuzgle. A well-preserved lava flow descends the mountain and is visible on its southern flank. Older flows reached distances of 9 km (5.6 miles) from the volcano. A linear 1.25 km (0.78 miles) long scarp runs across the northwestern flank of Cerro Tuzgle and separates two units of lava flows; it was formed by a localized collapse of the volcanic edifice in this sector. A depression in the southern flank of the volcano may also be evidence of a collapse in that direction. A parasitic vent is located on the western foot of the volcano.

There are abandoned sulfur mines on Cerro Tuzgle, which are visible from its south-southwestern flank; these include Mina Betty on the northwestern flank between 5,000–5,350 metres (16,400–17,550 ft) elevation where in 1939 seven sulfur outcrops were reported. A road transitable by trucks was constructed at that time to reach the summit area.

The volcano rises in a north-tilted, 18 km × 10 km (11.2 by 6.2 miles) north-south trending tectonic depression, which is delimited by normal faults and two horsts north and south of Cerro Tuzgle. The region is endorheic and drainages ultimately end in salt pans. The Quebrada Aguas Calientes passes west and Quebrada de Charcos east of the volcano; the latter becomes Quebrada Los Charcos north of the volcano and converges with Quebrada Aguas Calientes. Drainage around the volcano is focused by surrounding ridges into a watershed that drains northward, and contains permanent rivers fed by springs at the bottom of valleys. A smell of hydrogen sulfide, carbonate deposits and thermophilic algae have been reported from the Quebrada Aguas Calientes. Peatland-lake complexes occur southeast of Cerro Tuzgle.

== Geology ==
Along the west coast of South America, the Nazca Plate subducts in an east-northeast direction beneath the South American Plate in the Peru-Chile Trench, at a rate of 6.7 centimetres per year (2.6 in/year). The subduction process is responsible for the volcanic activity in the Andes, which occurs in four volcanic belts, from north to south these are the Northern Volcanic Zone, the Central Volcanic Zone, the Southern Volcanic Zone, and the Austral Volcanic Zone.

The Central Andes are subdivided into three sectors: the Western Cordillera with the active volcanic arc, the wide Altiplano-Puna high plateau and the Eastern Cordillera-Subandean Ranges. The high plateau began to form in the Eocene (Note: The time period between 56 and 33.9 million years ago.)–Oligocene (Note: The time period between 33.9 and 23.03 million years ago.) due to tectonic shortening of the Andes. Volcanic activity is distributed between the Western Cordillera and the Altiplano-Puna high plateau, where strike-slip faults and thrust faults organize magma ascent.

The tectonic regime in the area has changed over time and now the volcano lies just north of a transitional zone which separates steep subduction farther north from shallow subduction farther south. During the Miocene (Note: The time period between 23.03 and 5.333 million years ago.) and Pliocene, (Note: The time period between 5.333 and 2.58 million years ago.) the lower crust failed, allowing the uplift of the region and the injection of fresh magma that triggered extensive volcanic activity. During that time, the Subandean Ranges and the Eastern Cordillera formed. Later, during the Pliocene, subduction became steeper and volcanism shifted westward, and the composition of the remnant volcanism changed along with a change in the tectonic regime from uplift and east–west directed compression to north–south directed spreading and east–west directed compression. Volcanic activity also changed; between 17.5 and 5.3 million years ago it took place over the entire area whereas from 1.5 million years ago it has focused on the central-eastern Puna plateau. Between these two phases, sedimentation occurred and formed the Pastos Chicos Formation.

=== Local ===
Cerro Tuzgle is part of the back-arc of the Andean Central Volcanic Zone, being about 275 km (171 miles) east of the main volcanic arc, and its largest Quaternary member. Other volcanic cones in the area are San Jerónimo volcano and Negro de Chorrillos, which erupted 780,000±100,000 and 200,000±150,000 years ago, respectively, Tocomar, which erupted 1.5–0.5 million years ago, and Aguas Calientes caldera. All these volcanoes are located south of Cerro Tuzgle.

Extensive volcanic rocks of Miocene to Pliocene age occur in the area, which were erupted by volcanoes such as Aguas Calientes caldera and Cerro Queva. Older rocks belong to the Faja Eruptiva geologic formation of Ordovician (Note: The time period between 485.4±1.9 and 443.8±1.5 million years ago.) age. The total thickness of the crust reaches 55–60 km (34–37 miles). The basement is formed by Cambrian and Precambrian formations of metamorphic character, such as the Puncoviscana Formation. A large tectonic lineament, the Calama-Olacapato-El Toro lineament, intersects the Andes at Cerro Tuzgle. It reaches from the forearc in Chile across the mountain range into the foreland of the Andes in Argentina, and it separates the northern from the southern Puna. The distribution and history of volcanic activity differs between these two regions. Other similar faults cut across the Andes. The Calama-Olacapato-El Toro lineament is a strike-slip fault that consists of several separate faults, some of which show evidence of Quaternary activity and could produce earthquakes. Within the Andes proper, this activity mainly occurs in the form of normal faulting; only south of Cerro Tuzgle is there a segment with strike-slip faulting. Movement along most of these faults appears to clamp the magma chamber and magma conduits at Cerro Tuzgle, thus impeding volcanic activity there.

Gravimetric and magnetotelluric surveys have identified a partially molten magma chamber between 8–22 km (5.0–13.7 miles) depth, which also contains saline fluids. Seismic tomography has identified zones with anomalously low seismic velocity which descend from Cerro Tuzgle to 200 km (120 miles) depth in the downgoing slab.

=== Composition ===
Cerro Tuzgle has mainly erupted andesite and dacite, which constitute a crystal- and potassium-rich calc-alkaline suite with seriate flux and porphyritic textures. The rocks contain large feldspar and quartz phenocrysts and small phenocrysts of amphibole, clinopyroxene, olivine, orthopyroxene and plagioclase. Xenoliths and xenocrysts are also found and biotite, sanidine and zircon have been reported. At Aguas Calientes, sinters consisting of boronatro-calcite, chalcedony and opal occur. A cesium-rich pharmacosiderite-like mineral has been found at a hot spring. Different rock units have different phenocryst components and trace element compositions. The rocks of Cerro Tuzgle are the most diverse volcanic rocks in the back-arc of the Central Andes. One unusual mineral is caesium-containing pharmacosiderite.

Magma mixing processes involving fractionating mafic magmas and crystallization have been invoked to explain the origin of Cerro Tuzgle's magmas. The parent magmas originated in the mantle and the crust, with the crustal parts joining the mantle-derived magmas in the deep crust. These crustal components originally came from the upper crust and reached the lower crust during tectonic processes. At this stage crystal fractionation also took place. The ascending magmas then accumulated in the crust and either erupted or were assimilated by ascending mafic magmas.

== Climate and life ==
The climate is cold, owing to Cerro Tuzgle's high elevation, and winds blow mainly from the west and reach 2–20 metres per second (7.2–72.0 km/h). During winter, insolation is high, cloud cover and precipitation are low and strong winds blow through the area. According to 1939 reports, thunderstorms and snowfall are common at Cerro Tuzgle.

The region is arid, with less than 100 millimetres (3.9 in) annual precipitation as it is part of the Andean Arid Diagonal where the Eastern Cordillera prevents moisture-bearing winds from reaching the Puna. The little precipitation that falls originates in the Atlantic Ocean and the Amazon and arrives during the summer monsoon; additionally cold fronts come from the westerlies over the Pacific Ocean. The amount of precipitation is influenced by the El Niño-Southern Oscillation, where El Niño is associated with drought and La Niña with wetter weather.

Vegetation is sparse and consists of tola, Vachellia caven and yareta. Animals that live in the area include chinchillas, condors, coots, Darwin's rheas, ducks, eagles, Galea species, guanacos, llamas, Shipton's mountain cavy, suris and vicuñas. Trichomycterus fish have been found in creeks around the volcano. Peatlands are dominated by the plants Oxychloe andina, Distichia muscoides and Zameioscirpus muticus, with other cyperaceae being subordinate. Annual precipitation there amounts to 135 millimetres (5.3 in), almost all of which falls during October to March. Peatlands close to Cerro Tuzgle have been used to reconstruct the local climate during the Holocene. Reconstructed past precipitation levels show alternations between wetter and drier periods during the last 1,800 years, with the last 130 years being relatively dry.

== Eruption history ==
Cerro Tuzgle was active during the Pleistocene and its most recent eruption may have followed a period of inactivity. With one exception, most of its lava flows are partially degraded and buried by wind-transported material. Volcanic activity took place in multiple stages:

- First, a rhyodacitic ignimbrite with a volume of 0.5 cubic kilometres (0.12 cu mi) was erupted and flowed north over the pre-existing terrain, forming an 80-metre (260 ft) thick plateau. This homogeneous ignimbrite has a yellow-white colour; the middle and upper parts of the ignimbrite contain pumice and the lower part contains lithic fragments. It has been dated to be 650,000±180,000 years old and was presumably erupted from a small caldera now buried under Cerro Tuzgle.
- Lava domes of dacitic composition with a total volume of about 3.5 cubic kilometres (0.84 cu mi) were emplaced on the rim of the caldera, forming the "Old Complex". The "Old Complex" was erupted about 300,000 years ago. The domes crop out north, south and southeast from the volcano and are reddish-brown to light grey in colour. The lava flows are homogeneous and feature flow structures and laminations.

Two schemes for classifying the subsequent activity have been proposed, the first:

- Andesitic lava flows partially buried the lava domes, forming the "Pre-platform unit". It has been dated to be 300,000±1,000,000 years old.
- Mafic andesite lava filled the caldera. It constitutes the prominent "Platform unit".
- Northwest-southeast directed faulting dissected the volcano, and the "Postplatform" and "Young Flow" units were erupted along these faults. A latite lava flow has yielded ages of 100,000±100,000 and 100,000±300,000 years old. The "Young Flow" unit is considered to be of Holocene or Pleistocene-Holocene age, and is represented by multiple young lava flows.

A substantially different reconstruction was provided by Gianluca Norini et al in 2014:

- Six units of massive, up to 30-metre (100 ft) thick, dark grey to reddish-brown coloured lava flows form the San Antonio Synthem. This unit crops out on the southern and northwestern side of the volcano, which at this stage already had a major topographic expression. A fan formed by volcanic debris attributed to this stage covers an area of 12 square kilometres (4.6 sq mi) north of Cerro Tuzgle; it probably formed during a large collapse of the volcanic edifice that removed about 0.5 cubic kilometres (0.12 cu mi) of its volume and generated the scarp on the northwestern flank. Tectonic or magmatic processes may have caused the collapse. Afterwards, renewed volcanic activity buried part of the collapse scar.
- After an episode of erosion, the Azufre Synthem was emplaced around the summit. It consists of massive, up to 15 metres (49 ft) thick, dark grey to reddish-brown coloured lava flows. These lava flows are sometimes hydrothermally altered; the sulfur deposits on the volcano are linked to this synthem.
- Faulting and hydrothermal alteration took place after the emplacement of the Azufre Synthem. 13 units of lava flows form the Tuzgle Synthem. These aa and block lava flows reach thicknesses of 30 metres (100 ft) and are the last stage of volcanic activity at Cerro Tuzgle. A stage of solfataric activity followed the last eruptions and deposited sulfur.

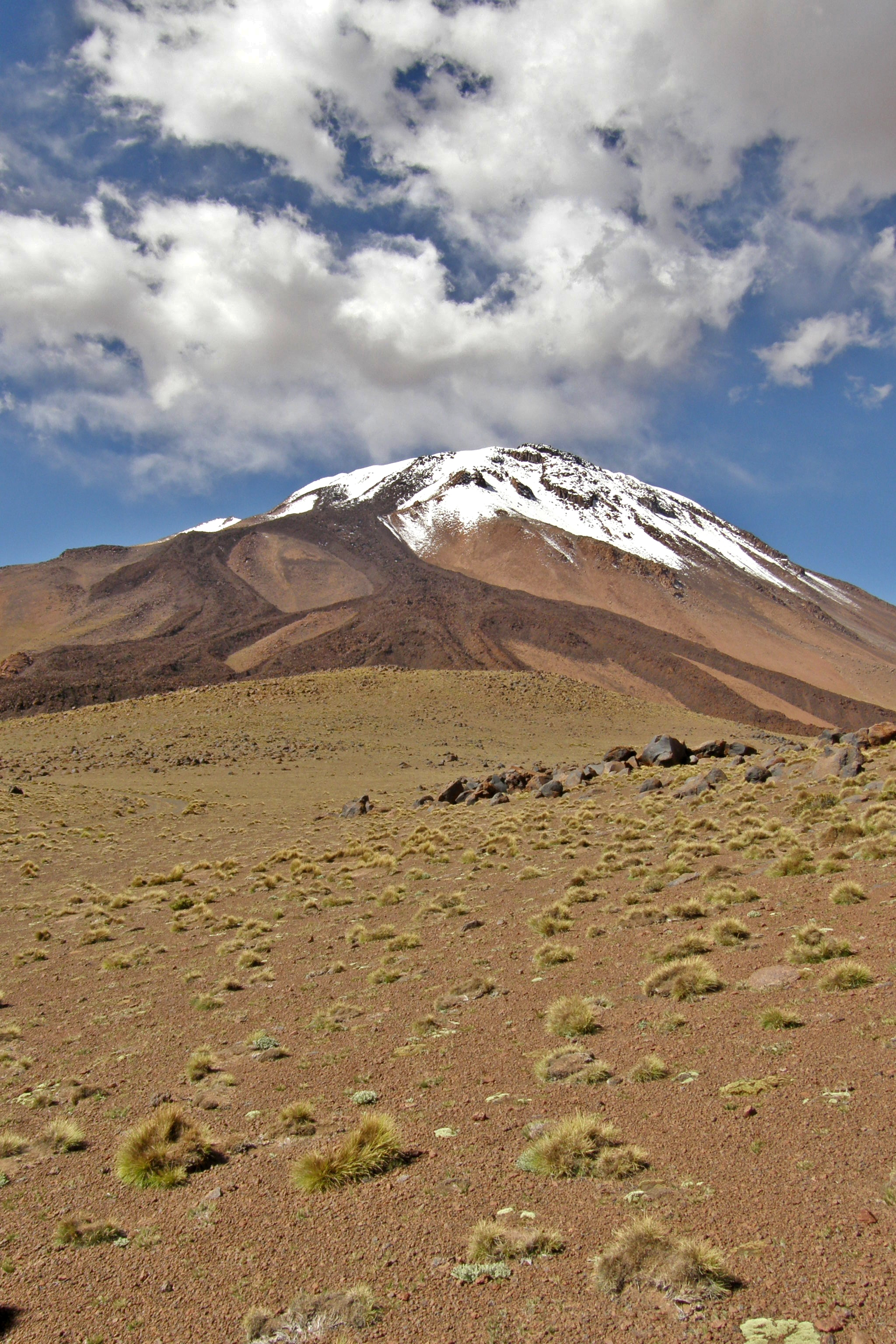
Recent lava flows on the southwestern flank of Cerro Tuzgle

The "Old Complex" has a volume of 3.5 cubic kilometres (0.84 cu mi), the subsequent units only reach 0.5 cubic kilometres (0.12 cu mi). There is a trend from voluminous ignimbrites and dacites, formed through melting of the crust at high temperatures, early in the volcano's history to less voluminous mafic magmas, which erupted through brittle faults. Tephra deposits east of San Antonio de los Cobres may have originated at Tuzgle.

The volcano is presently inactive. The Argentina geological service SEGEMAR considers Cerro Tuzgle among the more dangerous volcanoes in Argentina, ranking it 11th out of 38. While the region is thinly inhabited, the occurrence of a sector collapse at Cerro Tuzgle implies that mining and geothermal energy exploitation efforts in the area could be imperiled by similar future events.

=== Geothermal activity ===
Springs occur at Agua Caliente de Tuzgle 6 km (3.7 miles) northwest from the summit, and at Mina Betty (24°06′52.1″S 66°27′48.2″W) 6 km (3.7 miles) south-southeast. Both emit alkaline waters containing chloride at temperatures of 40–56 °C (104–133 °F) and 21 °C (70 °F), respectively. Agua Caliente de Tuzgle also emits gases and has produced sinter deposits. The Antuco hot springs southwest from Cerro Tuzgle may receive their heat from Cerro Tuzgle. These springs and other springs in the Tuzgle area are recharged by precipitation on surrounding ridges; large-scale fracture systems in the ground control its flow and water emerges in proximity to deeply incised valleys which provide the path for water to reach the surface. Temperatures at depth exceed 200 °C (392 °F).

== Tourism, mining and geothermal potential ==
Hot springs such as Pompeya and Tocomar might be used for tourism, as they are located close to the main roads of the area. The volcano might also be a suitable target for mountaineering; its ascent poses little difficulty to trained mountaineers. Inca ceremonial sites in the form of a raised platform and structures formed by piled-up rocks on the summit region were reported by María Constanza Ceruti in 1999. Neighbouring volcanoes as well as the Nevado del Chañi ridge are visible from the summit.

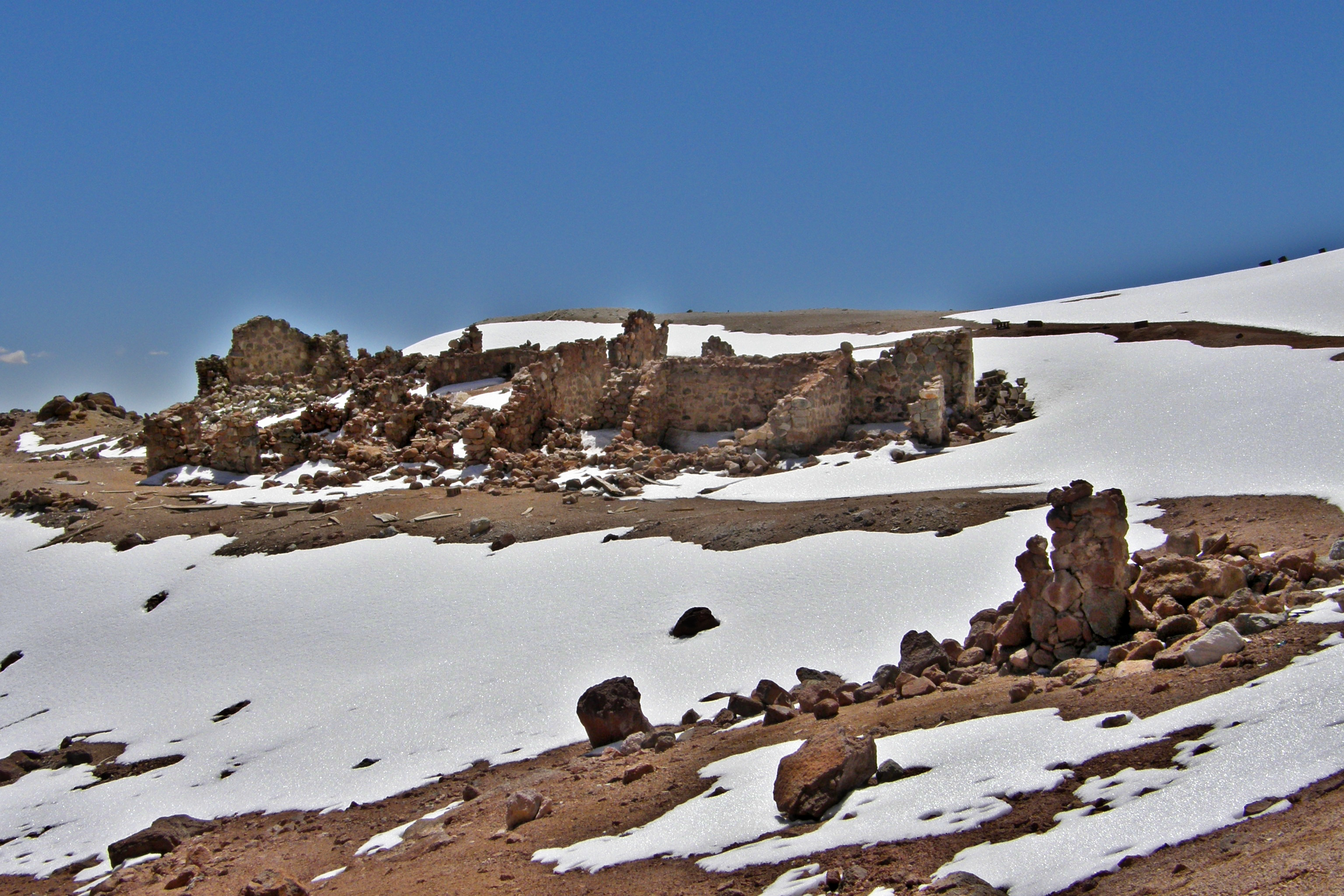
An abandoned sulfur mine on Cerro Tuzgle

The first findings of sulfur occurred in 1924, but they were not immediately exploited. A mining concession for Mina Betty was issued in 1933, while approval for two other proposed mines in the summit area was still pending in 1939. The machinery required for sulfur processing was installed south-southeast of the volcano and the site bore the name "Ojo del Tuzgle"; the sulfur was transported there either by mules or by trucks. A spring there was used as a water source for mining activities. During parts of the year bad weather conditions rendered mining impossible.

In the 1970s and 1980s numerous companies prospected the area for geothermal power generation. They established the presence of two superposed heat reservoirs, one at 50–300 metres (160–980 ft) depth in an older ignimbrite and another at 2 km (1.2 miles) depth in Ordovician-age rocks. Initially they were interpreted as a joint Tocomar-Tuzgle geothermal system before these were identified as separate systems in 2008 and 2016. A major power line between Argentina and Chile runs across the area, and local mines along with the towns of Olacapato and San Antonio de Los Cobres could provide a market for geothermal power. Private companies are active in conducting feasibility studies. A potential yield of 28–34 megawatts of electrical power has been estimated, but as of 2020 no progress towards exploiting these resources has been made. The geothermal vents could also be used to extract minerals or for spas. Concerns have been raised that the sensitive ecosystems might be threatened by human activity.

== See also ==
- List of volcanoes in Argentina
