= Negra Muerta volcanic complex =

Caldera in Argentina

Coordinates: 24°27′30″S 66°12′30″W

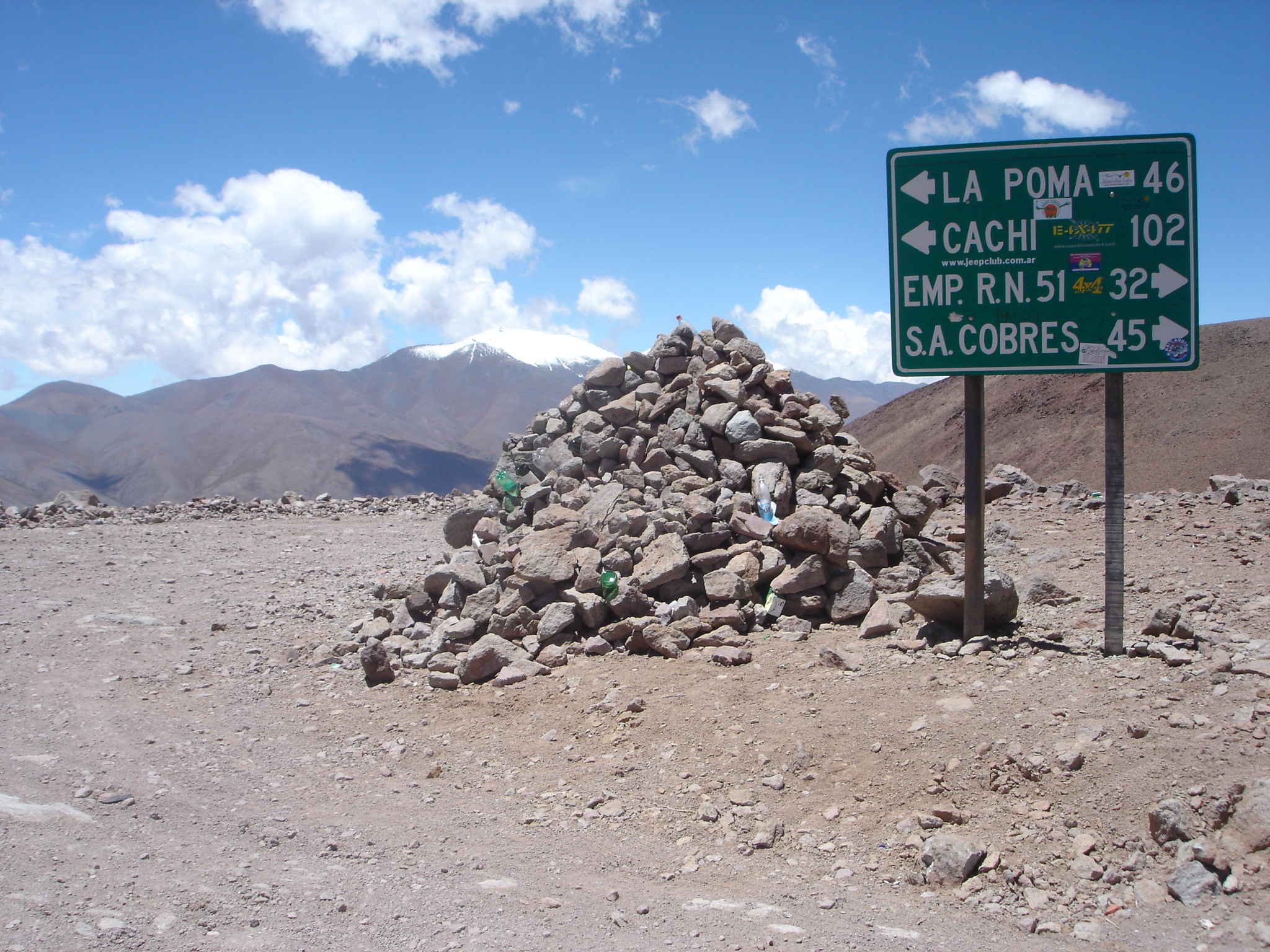
View from Abra del Acay over the caldera towards Nevado del Acay

Negra Muerta is a caldera in Argentina. It is part of the volcanic centres of the Andean Volcanic Belt, which has formed a number of calderas in large ignimbrite producing eruptions. These calderas include Aguas Calientes, Cerro Panizos, Galan, Negra Muerta and La Pacana. Some of these volcanic centres appear to be associated with large fault zones that cross the Puna.

Negra Muerta is a caldera with dimensions of 12 by 7 kilometres (7.5 mi × 4.3 mi) that was formed over two volcanic periods, one about 9 million years ago and another over 7 million years ago. Each volcanic period included the formation of ignimbrites, the Acay ignimbrite in the first and the Toba 1 ignimbrite in the second. After the Toba 1 ignimbrite, effusive activity forming lava flows occurred. After the cessation of volcanic activity, glacial and fluvial erosion has exposed subvolcanic structures.

== Geomorphology ==
=== General geography and geology ===
Negra Muerta lies on the eastern margin of the Puna and is associated with the major Calama-Olacapato-El Toro fault, which was active starting from the Paleozoic. Dilatation along this fault influenced the volcanic processes at Negra Muerta and other volcanoes, by opening up paths for magma ascent. This fault and several others are associated with belts of volcanoes that extend across the Puna. Crustal shortening and folding also contributed to the morphogenesis of the region.

Nevado de Acay lies northeast just outside the caldera margin, and the town of San Antonio de los Cobres only about 30 kilometres (19 mi) northwest. The cities of Salta and Jujuy lie about 75 kilometres (47 mi) east of Negra Muerta. The region has an arid climate, thus geological features are often buried beneath uneroded rocks and difficult to access.

The south Central Andes in the past were the site of large scale dacitic ignimbrite-forming eruptions and the formation of calderas, linked to the interaction between a subducting slab and the overlying crust. These include Aguas Calientes, Cerro Panizos, Galan and La Pacana.

The area was also affected by stratovolcanoes and other styles of eruptive activity. These were often more diverse in chemical composition than the ignimbrite forming eruptions, a property attributed to various magma processes and the interaction between the mantle and the crust.

=== Local geography and geology ===
The Negra Muerta caldera is the easternmost caldera in the Puna where it meets the Eastern Cordillera, and has dimensions of 12 by 7 kilometres (7.5 mi × 4.3 mi). The caldera does not feature a ring fault; rather several individual faults were involved in its formation. The caldera floor fragmented before the collapse and sagged around a hinge in the southern sector of the caldera. The floor of the caldera lies at elevations of 4,700–3,900 metres (15,400–12,800 ft), descending from north to south. The northern and western margin reach elevations of 5,500 metres (18,000 ft); the southern and eastern margins were lowered by glacial erosion during the Pleistocene and fluvial erosion by the Calchaqui River, which along with some tributaries originates in the caldera and has eroded about 1,300 metres (4,300 ft) of rock. Presently, acid mine drainage occurs in the caldera through natural processes and renders the water of the Calchaquí River unsuitable for drinking.

The Calama-Olacapato-El Toro fault passes 5 kilometres (3.1 mi) north of the caldera, the Saladillo fault southwest of the caldera, and Abra de Acay lies on the northwestern caldera margin.

The caldera contains three lava domes aligned north to south with lengths ranging from 3.5 kilometres (2.2 mi) to 1 kilometre (0.62 mi), dykes and other subvolcanic structures. These structures have been exposed by erosion in the caldera. A 0.5 kilometres (0.31 mi) wide structure close to the caldera centre appears to be a pipe-like structure, which appears to be the main vent. Some faults are also observed within the caldera, which have offset the ground over distances of about 150 metres (490 ft).

Some of these dykes appear to be the source of lava flows and their remnants which lie on top of the Toba 1 ignimbrite. There are at least three such lava flows which cover a surface of 105 square kilometres (41 sq mi) outside of the caldera. Their composition ranges from andesite to rhyodacite, with the andesite being erupted later.

The volcanic rocks of Negra Muerta are rich in potassium and belong to the calc-alkaline series. The basement of the volcano is formed by the sedimentary Salta Group of Cretaceous-Tertiary age and the below lying Cambrian Puncoviscana Formation. These sediments formed within rifting basins and contain both volcanic and carbonate rocks. The Negra Muerta caldera may host a porphyry copper deposit, which is however not mined.

== Eruptive history ==
Two distinct volcanic phases are recorded at Negra Muerta, the first 9 million years ago and the second 7.6-7.3 million years ago. Each phase was associated with a pulse in caldera formation. Non-volcanic processes later in the caldera history include the deposition of alluvium and glacial till.

The 25 cubic kilometres (6.0 cu mi) Acay ignimbrite was erupted 9 million years ago and covers a surface area of 250 square kilometres (97 sq mi) outside of the caldera, but some material is also found within the caldera. It is formed by a rhyolite glass matrix containing phenocrysts made of amphibole, biotite, magnetite, plagioclase and quartz. The ignimbrite is rich in crystals and fiammes. This ignimbrite originated in a magma chamber 8–10 kilometres (5.0–6.2 mi) deep, where the ignimbrite formed in a closed system by fractional crystallization.

The c. 6 cubic kilometres (1.4 cu mi) Toba 1 ignimbrite is dated to 7.6 - 7.3 ± 0.4 million years ago and was deposited on top of the Acay ignimbrite. It covers a surface area of 120 square kilometres (46 sq mi). It is formed by feldspar-biotite-rhyolite containing over 55% of biotite, plagioclase and quartz phenocrysts. The magma chamber for this eruption laid at a depth of 7–11 kilometres (4.3–6.8 mi). Compositionally, the lava flows and the ignimbrite originated from slightly different magmas. It is likely that the injection of new mafic magma into the previous magma chamber triggered this eruption. The lava flows were erupted about 7.3 ± 0.1 million years ago, after the Toba 1 eruption. A further small ignimbrite named Morro II has been linked to Negra Muerta.
