= Negro de Chorrillos =

Volcano in the Andes

Coordinates: 24.2715°S 66.4148°W

Negro de Chorrillos is a volcano in the Andes.

Negro de Chorrillos - sometimes also known as Cerro Chorrillos or Cerro Negro de Chorrillos - lies on the Puna, a high plateau in the Andes. Numerous volcanoes of the Central Volcanic Zone of the Andes, including calderas, monogenetic volcanoes and polygenetic volcanoes, rise on this plateau. Most of the volcanoes there are back-arc volcanoes with only a few stratovolcanoes such as Tunupa, Cerro Tuzgle and Uturuncu the second of which is close to Negro de Chorrillos. The major Calama-Olacapato-El Toro fault lie nearby, as do active and inactive hot springs. This major fault zone is accompanied by a chain of volcanic systems; in general, volcanism in the region has been influenced by large fault systems. The basement in the region is formed by Precambrian-Cambrian units with Cretaceous-Oligocene sediments and ignimbrites from the Aguas Calientes caldera.

Negro de Chorrillos covers a surface of about 5.88 square kilometres (2.27 sq mi) and features a scoria cone. It has erupted lava flows of the aa lava and block lava type, which flowed 4 kilometres (2.5 mi) down a valley. Ash fall, lava bombs and scoria are also found. Both Negro de Chorrillos and neighbouring San Jerónimo centres have heights of 300–450 metres (980–1,480 ft) and widths of 750–950 metres (2,460–3,120 ft). The volume of both centres is less than 0.1 cubic kilometres (0.024 cu mi). Negro de Chorrillos may be the source of local pyroclastic flows, and material eroded from such flows.

The Negro de Chorrillos monogenetic volcano formed during the Pleistocene. Together with neighbouring San Geronimo volcano it lies on a left-trending strike-slip fault, the El Toro fault. Nearby faults include the Incachule fault to the south and the Chorrillos fault to the north, which actually crosses the Negro de Chorrillos centre. Both faults are part of the Calama-Olacapato-El Toro fault. An onset of crustal tension probably facilitated the ascent of magma.

Negro de Chorrillos like San Geronimo has erupted basaltic trachyandesite to trachyandesite, both shoshonite magmas. The eruption that gave rise to Negro de Chorrillos took place in several stages that produced magmas of different composition. They formed over the volcanic back-arc of the Peru-Chile Trench; low percentage melts that were contaminated with lithospheric material formed these two centres.

Eruption dates from the volcano are contradictory; radiometric dates range from 200,000 ± 150,000 years ago, 450,000 years ago, 200,000 ± 80,000 years ago and - the most recent dating effort - 51,000 ± 2,000 years ago according to potassium-argon dating. Lava flows from Negro de Chorrillos were later cut by fault offset.
