= Abra del Acay =

Mountain pass in Argentina

Coordinates: 24°23′S 66°14′W

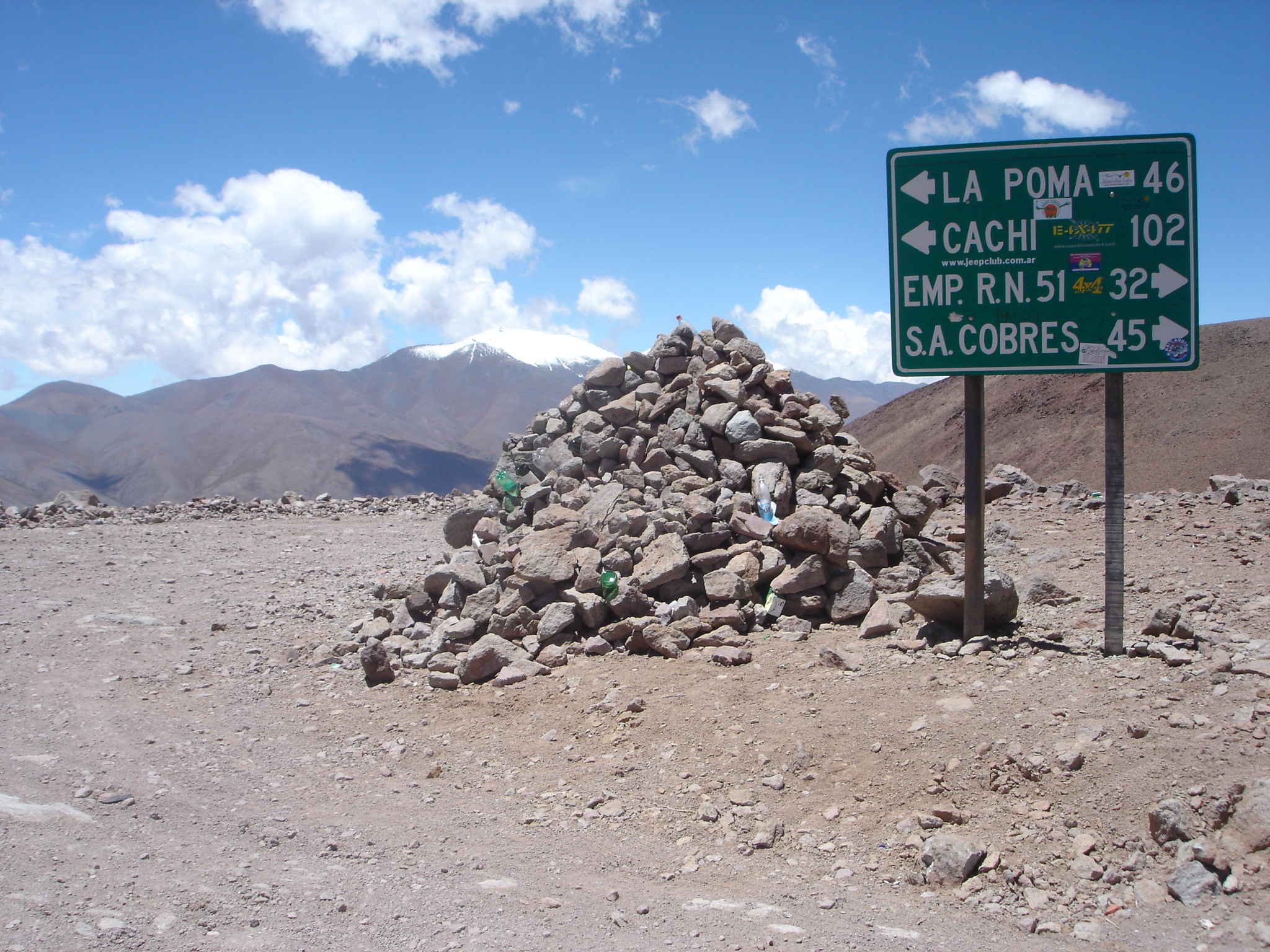
Distances from the Abra del Acay. The snow-capped peak in the distance is the 5,751 meters (18,868 ft) Nevado de Acay.

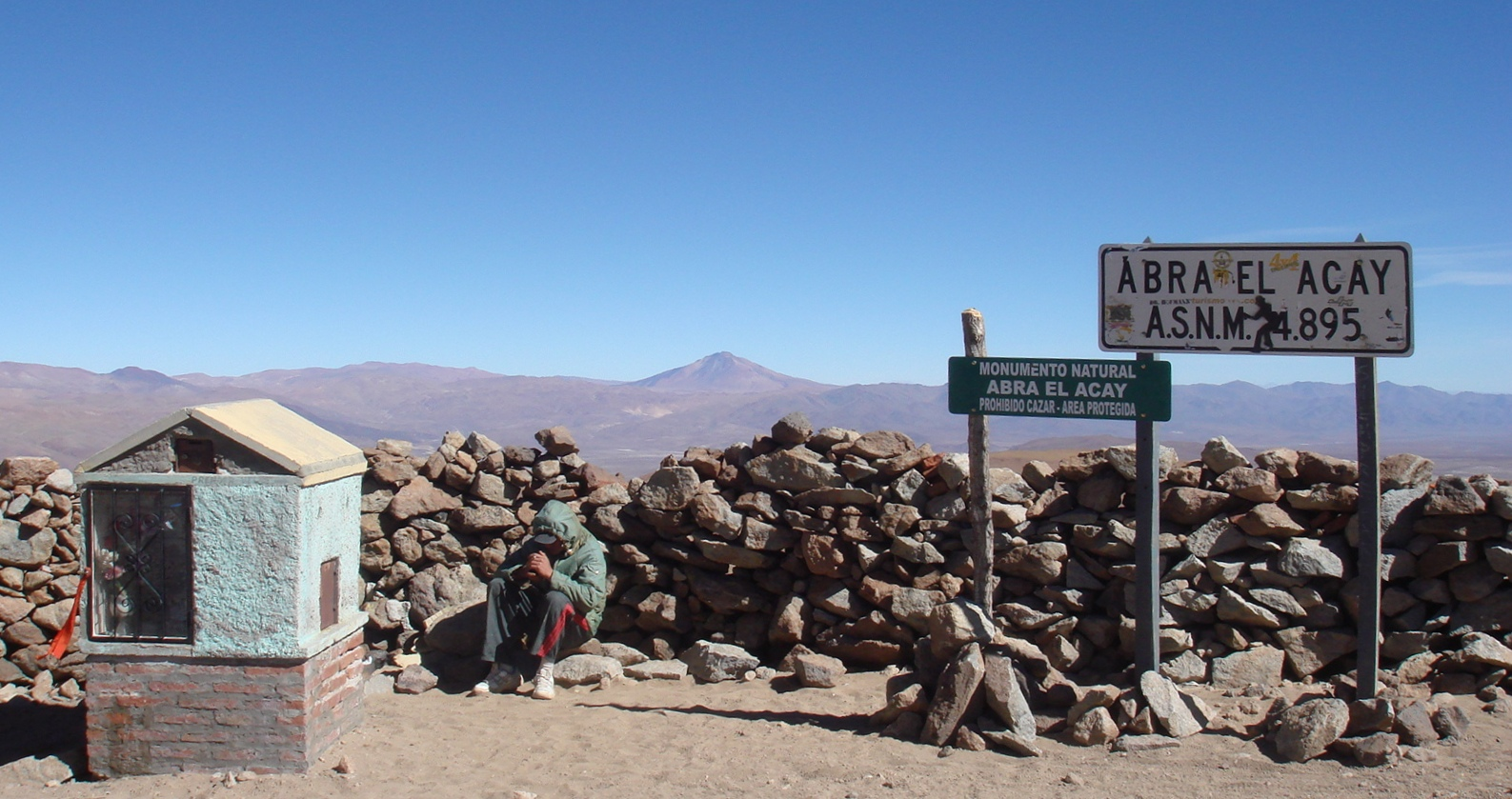
Abra del Acay, La Poma Department, Salta Province, Argentina. The peak in the distance is the 5,501 meters (18,048 ft) Cerro Tuzgle.

The Abra del Acay in La Poma Department, Salta Province, Argentina is the highest point on Argentina's National Route 40. Located at , its altitude is 4,972 meters (16,312 ft), even though an old sign informs visitors it stands at 4,895 meters (16,060 ft).

The Abra del Acay is approximately 25 kilometers (16 mi) geodesic distance southeast from San Antonio de los Cobres, although the direct route by road is about 45 kilometers (28 mi).

Inaugurated on 8 July 1960 after three years of construction, this unpaved part of Argentina’s National Route 40 is only suitable for all-terrain vehicles, with the exception of some months in the year when meteorological and maintenance conditions allow normal vehicles to transit. The road inclination of 4.5% and oxygen deprivation due to altitude make the crossing difficult for both people and vehicles with non-turbocharged engines.
