= Bajo Caracoles =

Coordinates: 47°27′S 70°56′W

- Municipality and village
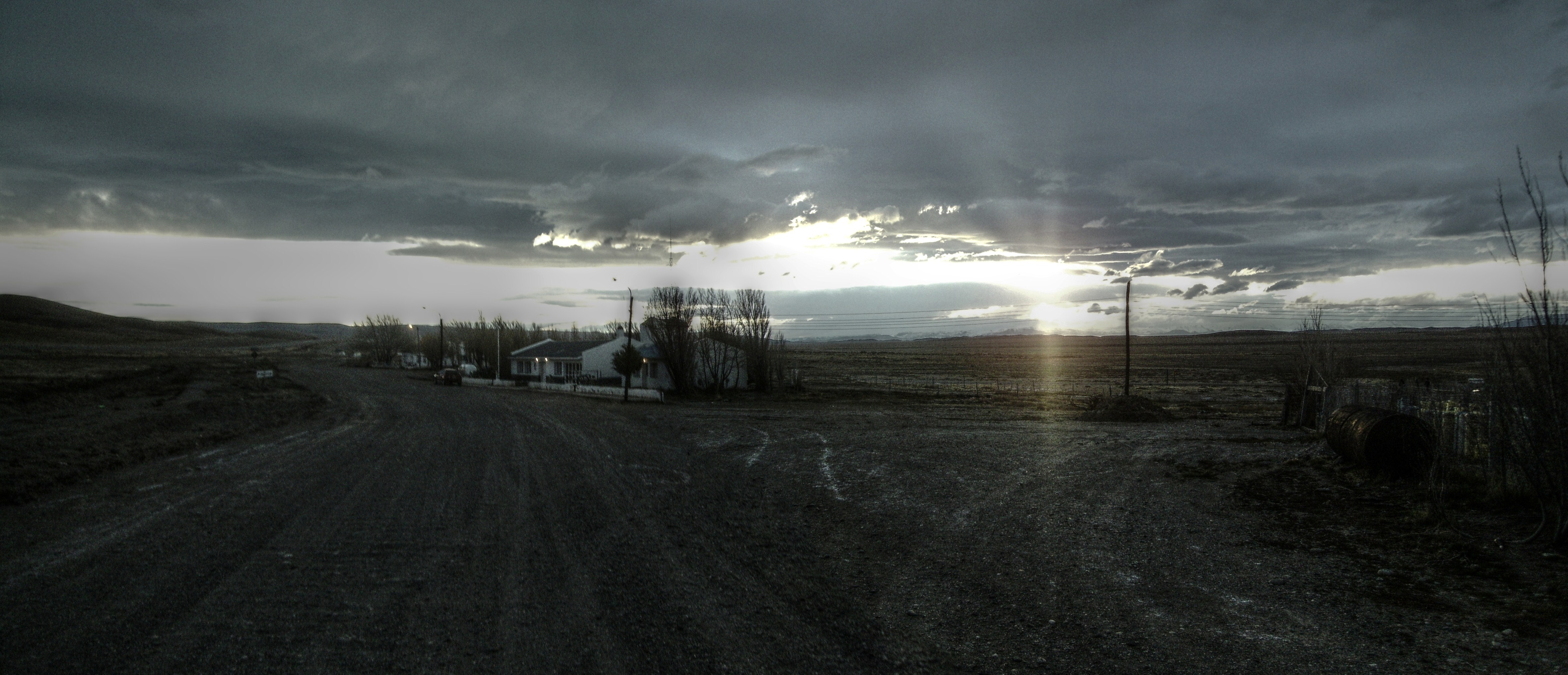
- The skyline of Bajo Caracoles
- Interactive map of Bajo Caracoles
- Country: Argentina
- Province: Santa Cruz Province
- Department: Lago Argentino Department
- Elevation: 2,011 ft (613 m)
- Time zone: UTC−3 (ART)
- Climate: BSk

Bajo Caracoles is a village and municipality in Santa Cruz Province in southern Argentina. It lies on Ruta 40 about 127 km (79 mi) south of the town of Perito Moreno, and 3 km (1.9 mi) south of the junction with the access road to Cueva de las Manos.

The population of the village in the 2001 census was 31.
