= San Jerónimo volcano =

Volcano in Argentina

Coordinates: 24°14′S 66°30′W

San Jerónimo is a volcano in Argentina. It is located 18 kilometres (11 mi) from San Antonio de los Cobres and the lava flows are visible from the road.

Also known as San Gerónimo, it is a monogenetic volcano like Negro de Chorrillos and with it part of the geological Piedras Blancas Formation. The volcano has a cone with three craters and reaches an elevation of 4,950 metres (16,240 ft), which covers an area of about 1.9 square kilometres (0.73 sq mi). It developed on top of ignimbrites of Miocene age of the Aguas Calientes caldera and is formed by lava, lava bombs and scoria. The volcano erupted basaltic-trachyandesitic lava which propagated to distances of 8–10 kilometres (5.0–6.2 mi) from the vent and which dammed a local river, forming a lake. The dating of the eruption is uncertain; an older estimate was 780,000 ± 100,000 years ago but a newer indicates that it formed 144,000 ± 3,000 years ago. The older age was probably a product of rocks contaminated by xenoliths.

San Jerónimo is part of a 170 kilometres (110 mi) long alignment of volcanoes along the Calama-Olacapato-El Toro fault. This string of volcanoes is diverse, including calderas and stratovolcanoes on the one hand and plutons and monogenetic volcanoes on the other hand. This fault zone is represented by fault scarps, ponds and springs that occur in the area of the volcanoes. One volcano that is part of this structure is Aguas Calientes caldera, on whose border the San Jerónimo volcano is constructed. The wider region is part of the Andean Central Volcanic Zone, where a number of volcanoes ranging from monogenetic volcanoes over polygenetic volcanoes to calderas developed.
