= National Route 40 (Argentina) =

Highway in Argentina

Map of Argentina, showing Route 40, in red

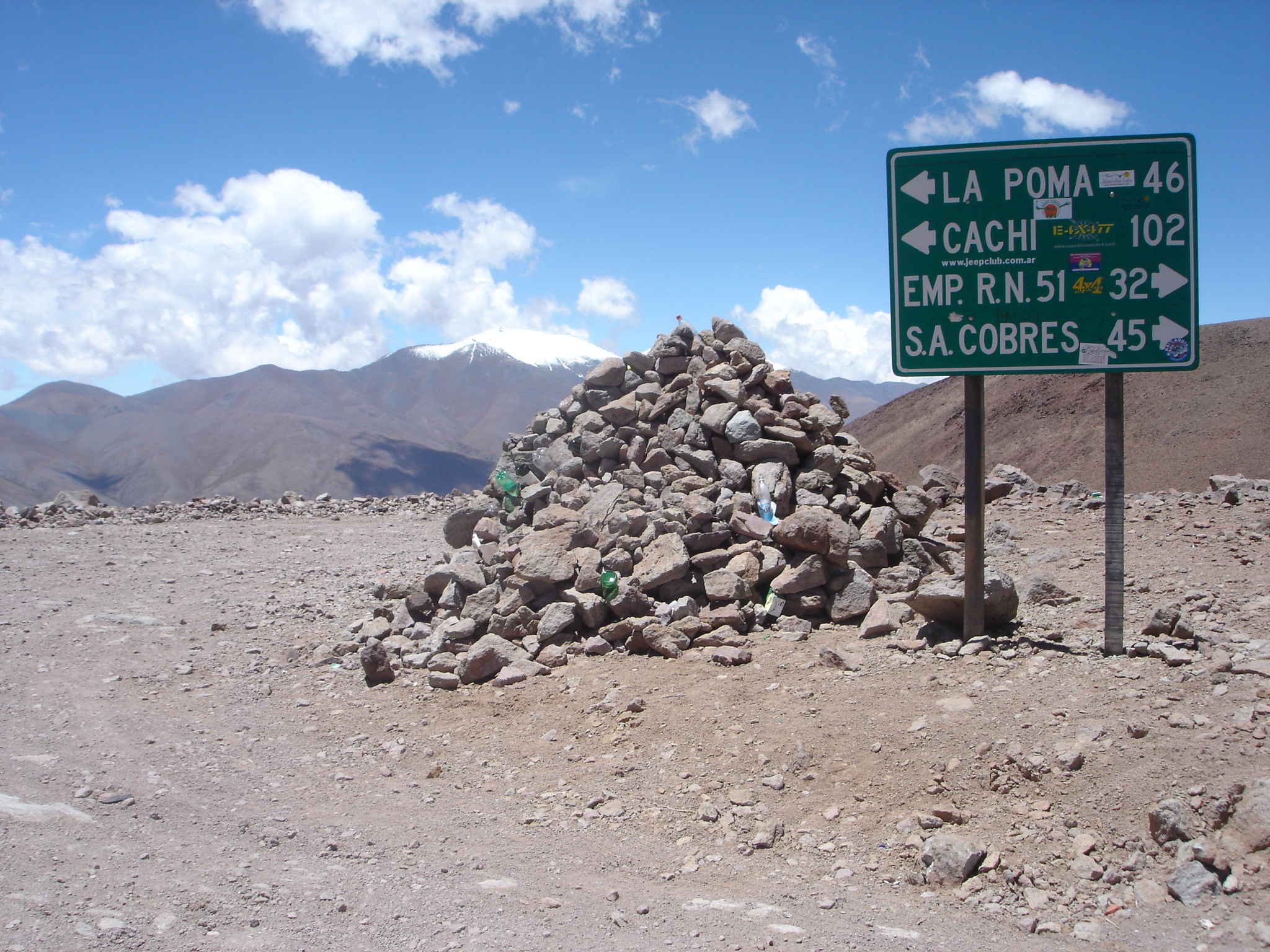
Abra del Acay (elevation 5,061 metres (16,604 ft)) in Salta Province

National Route 40, also known as RN40 or "Ruta 40", is a route in western Argentina, stretching from Cabo Vírgenes near Río Gallegos in Santa Cruz Province in the south to La Quiaca in Jujuy Province in the north with approximately 5194 km length. The route parallels the Andes mountains. The southern part of the route, by now largely paved, has become a well-known adventure tourism journey, and there are plans to pave the whole road.

RN40 is the longest route in South America and one of the longest in the world alongside such routes as U.S. Route 66, Canada's Trans-Canada Highway, and Australia's Stuart Highway, more than 5,000 kilometres (3,100 mi) long. At its traditional southern end near the city of Río Gallegos, it starts at sea level. It then crosses 20 national parks, 18 major rivers, and 27 passes in the Andes. Route 40's highest point is 5,000 m (16,404 ft) in Abra del Acay in Salta Province.

The road crosses the provinces of Santa Cruz, Chubut, Río Negro, Neuquen, Mendoza, San Juan, La Rioja, Catamarca, Tucumán, Salta, and Jujuy.

== Description ==
Incorporation of sections of other highways into RN40, along with paving, is part of an Argentine government initiative to promote national tourism by drawing upon the legendary and some say mythical attraction attached to the route. The attraction is international in scope, and many websites around the world advertise the private and commercial adventures associated with travel on this roadway.

There are a number of internationally important sites along this route. Cueva de las Manos contains cave art dating back some 13,000 years. Los Glaciares National Park, the second largest national park in Argentina, and the Calchaquí Valleys also are near the route.

=== North ===
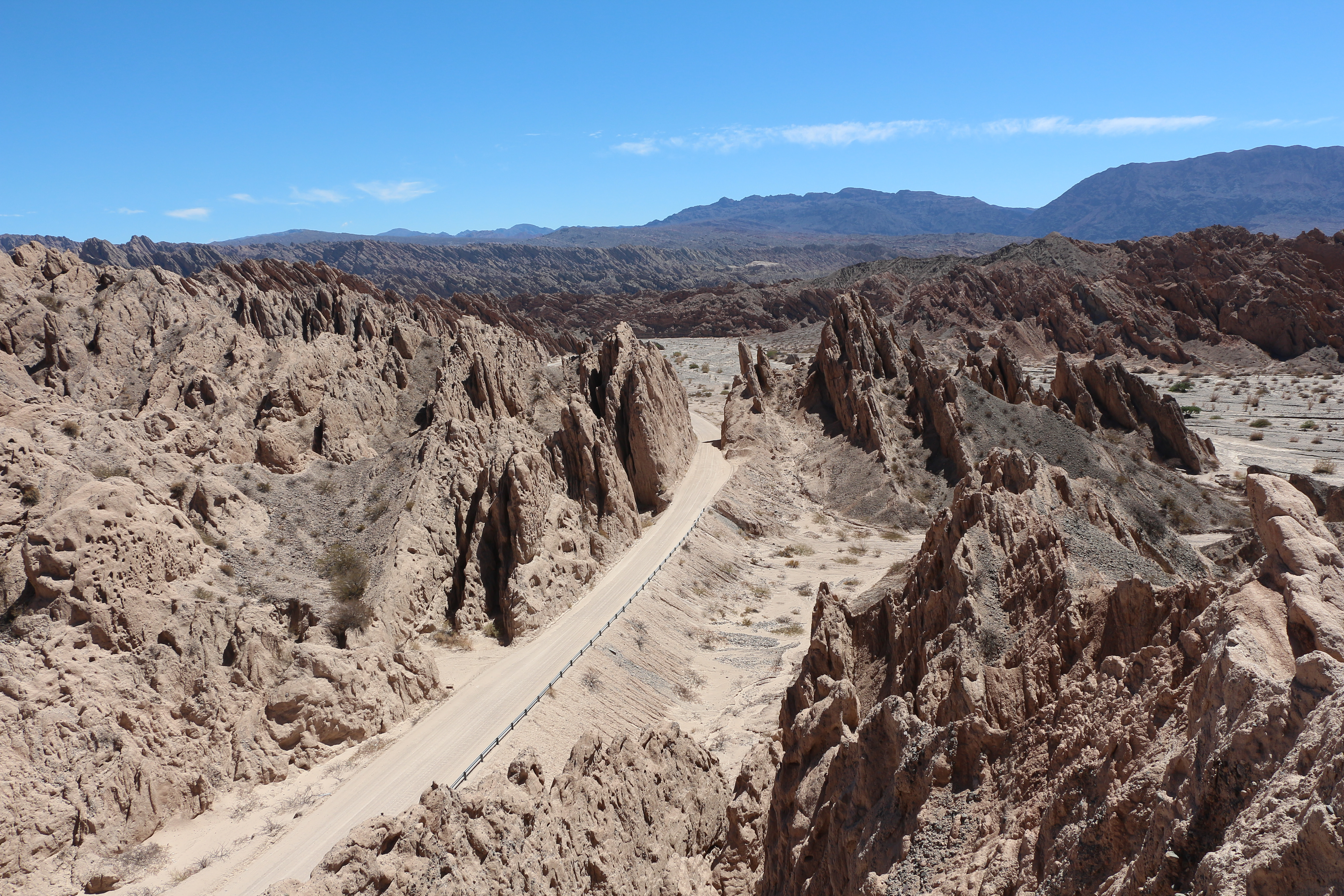
RN40 in Calchaquí Valleys.

RN40 begins at the Bolivian border at La Quiaca. From there it goes west to San Juan de Oro, then turns south, parallel to the Andes, by San Antonio de los Cobres and Cachi and through the Calchaquí Valleys to Cafayate, then via Belén, Villa Unión to San Juan. From San Juan, RN40 is a busy highway to Mendoza.

=== South ===
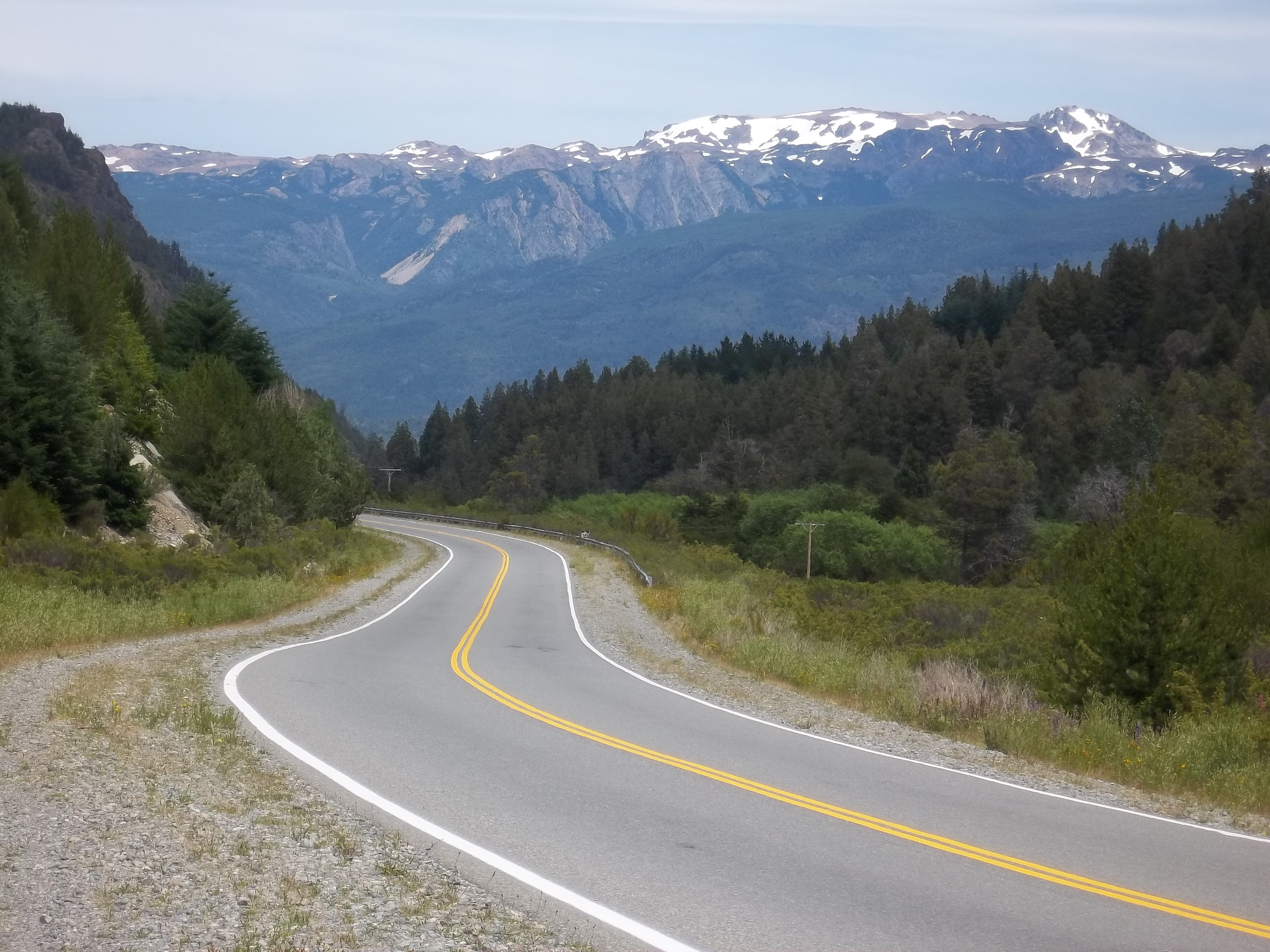
RN40 near Bariloche, Río Negro.

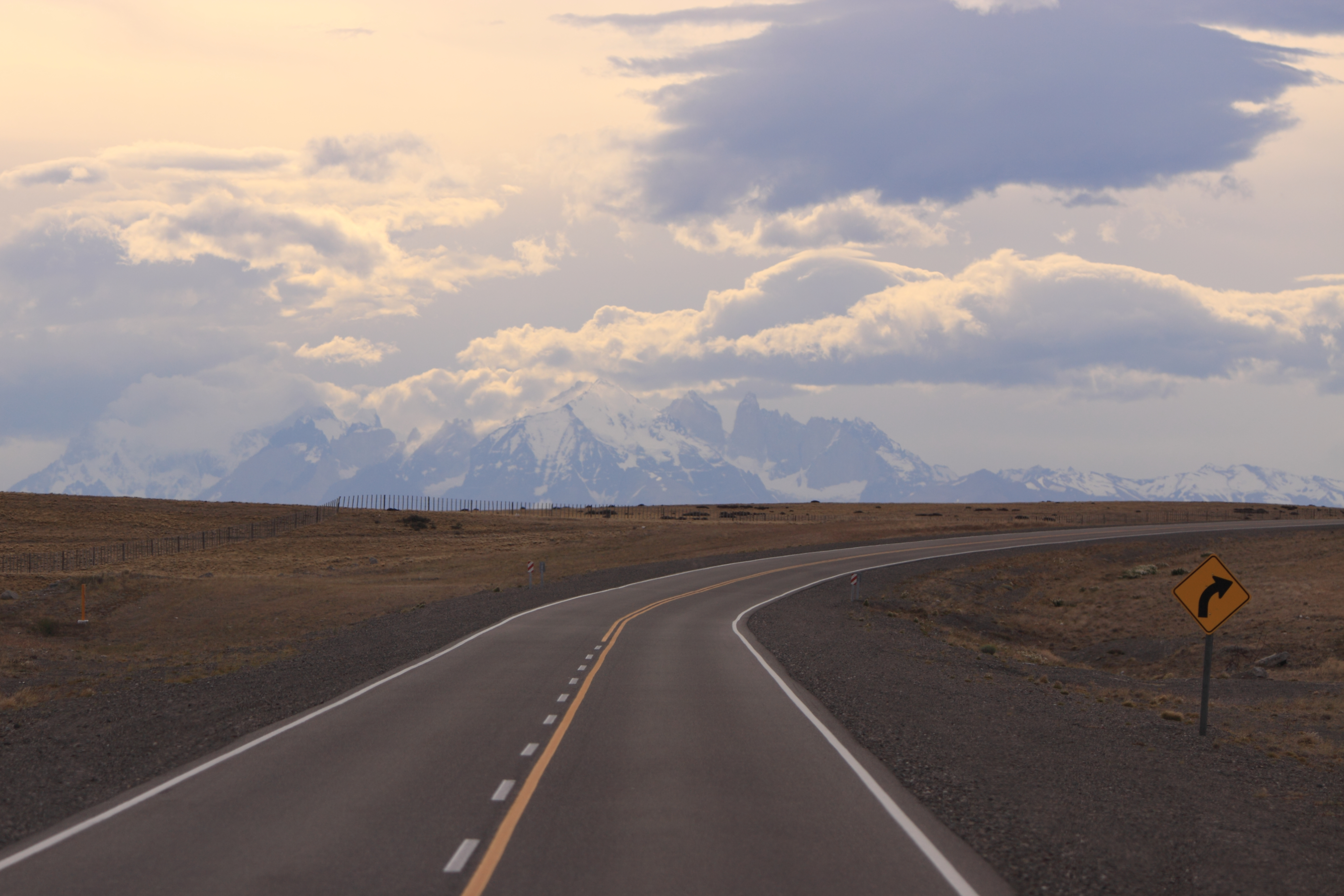
The Cordillera Paine seen from Argentina's RN40 in Santa Cruz.

From Mendoza, RN40 continues south to Pareditas, Malargüe, Chos Malal, and Zapala. After Zapala the rout goes to Junin de los Andes, and from there to San Martin de los Andes. Trough "La ruta de los siete lagos" goes to Villa la Angostura and then to Bariloche. It takes a route to the east of Bariloche to El Maitén and a junction with RN258 at Leleque. It then passes near Esquel and continues by Tecka, José de San Martín, and Alto Río Senguer to a junction with the RN43 at the town of Perito Moreno.

The road then enters the most remote part of its route. 124 kilometres (77 mi) south of Perito Moreno is the junction with a side road to Cueva de las Manos, and 3 kilometres (1.9 mi) farther is the tiny settlement of Bajo Caracoles (population 100). After a further 101 kilometres (63 mi), there is a junction with the road to Perito Moreno National Park, but there is no habitation apart from a police station and later an estancia until the small town of Tres Lagos, some 235 kilometres (146 mi) further south. From Tres Lagos, the road is paved to a junction 32 kilometres (20 mi) east of El Calafate and another junction at El Cerrito, where RN40 leaves the main highway to Rio Gallegos. The route then takes a roundabout route to Rio Gallegos through the town of 28 de Noviembre, where it turns east to follow the valley of the Gallegos River. It reaches the Atlantic coast at Punta Loyola, at the mouth of the Gallegos River 36 kilometres (22 mi) from Rio Gallegos.

== History ==
Since the beginning of its construction in 1935, the route has changed several times. On 24 November 2004, the Argentine national directorate of highways (Dirección Nacional de Vialidad) promulgated Resolution 1.748/04, which changed the milestone markings and placed the "zero" kilometer stone at the new southernmost extreme of the road, at Cabo Virgenes, near the Straits of Magellan. Because in January 2009 there was no roadway constructed between the new marker location at Cabo Virgenes and Punta Loyola (near Río Gallegos), the provisional driving starting point as of early 2009 was at the KM 100 location.

Before 2004, RN40 was divided into "Ruta 40 Sur" (south) and "Ruta 40 Norte" (north) with the earlier "traditional" zero-km starting point at the intersection of San Martín and Garibaldi streets in the city of Mendoza, in Mendoza Province. That zero-km marker was subsequently moved to the eastern access point of that city, at the intersection of RN7 and Gob Avenue. Ricardo Videla (also known as Avenida Costanera). The intent of new legislation and remarking of roadways will move the traditional northern terminus of RN40 to the frontier with Bolivia near the location of Ciénaga de Paicone.

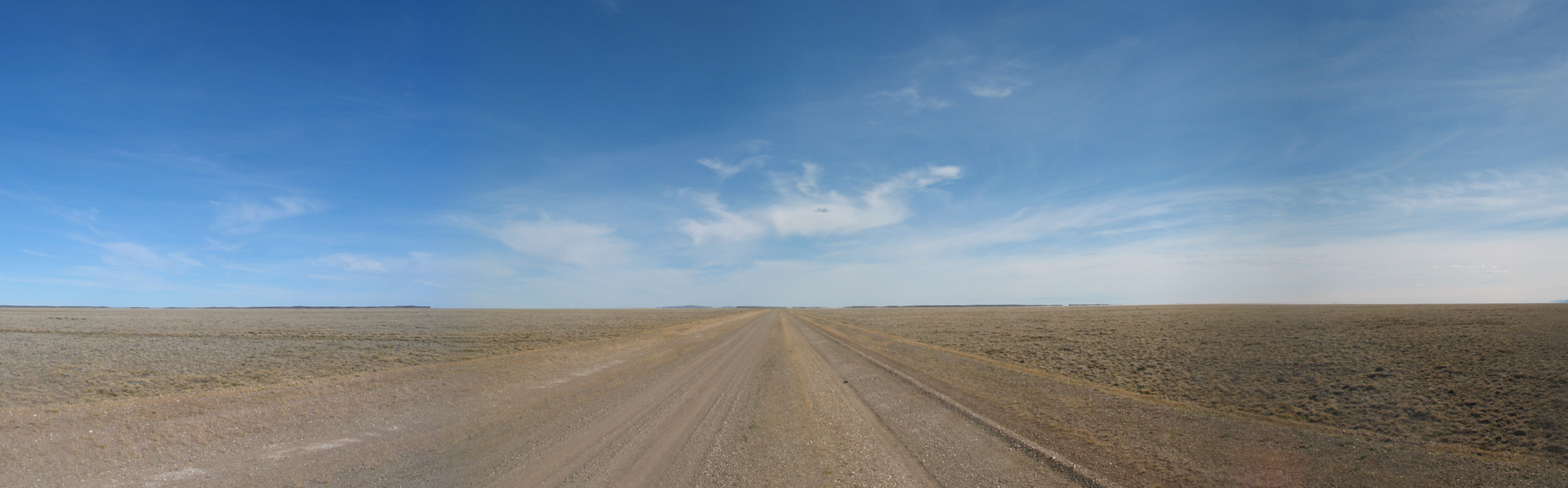
National Route 40, Chubut Province (2004)

== Latest developments ==
On 20 May 2006, the Argentine national highway directorate and the Jujuy provincial highway department signed an agreement in which sections of Jujuy provincial highways 85, 70, 74, 7, 64, 65, and 5 were transferred to national control for the construction of the so-called "Mining Corridor", which will become the new path of RN40, more toward the west in that province. The agreement was ratified by provincial law 5520. Accordingly, the section of the road between San Antonio de los Cobres and Abra Pampa is renamed National Route 1V40.

In February 2009, President Cristina Kirchner announced that the remaining unpaved length of the route in Santa Cruz would be paved.

== Gallery ==
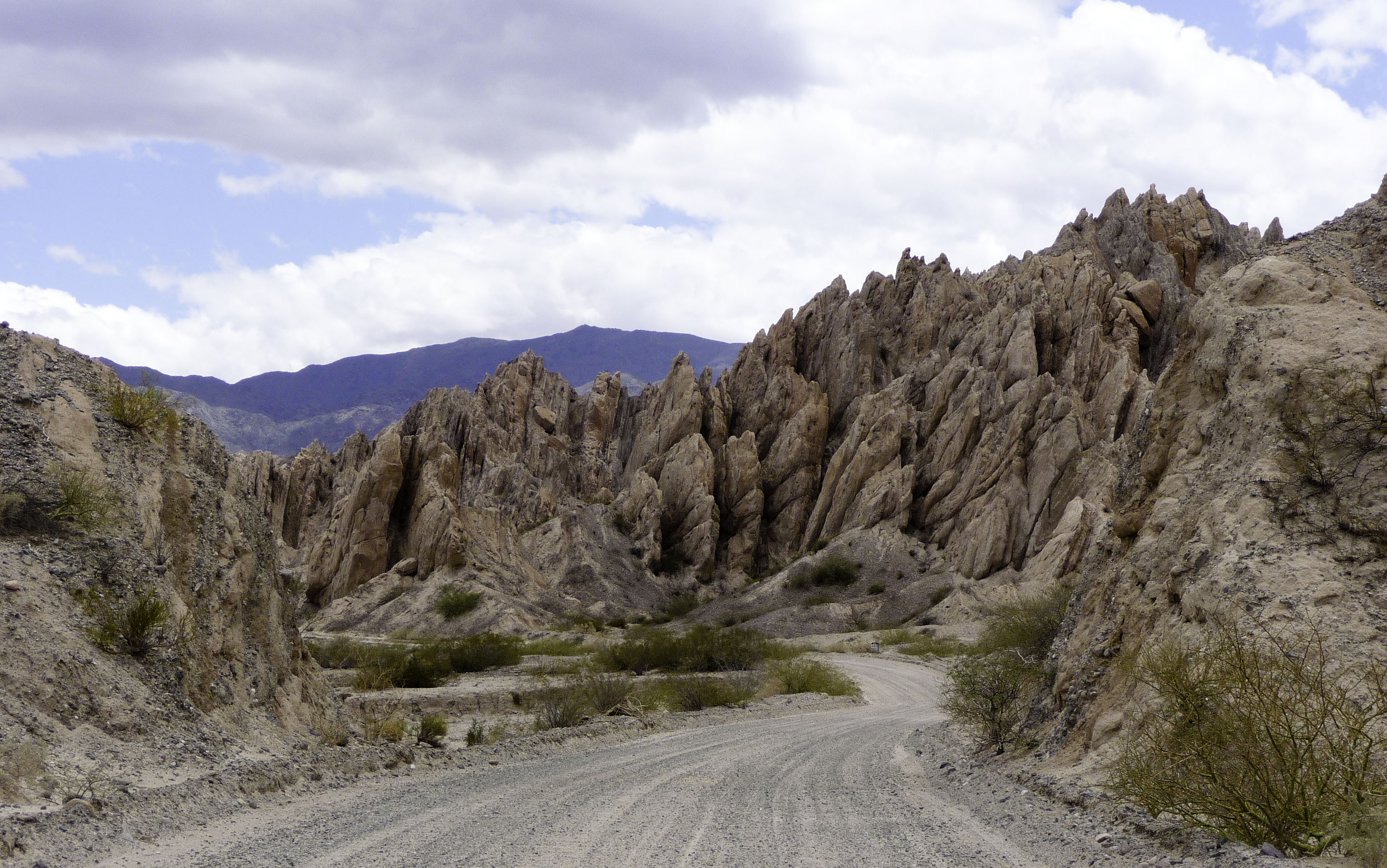
Interesting geology on Ruta 40, N Argentina

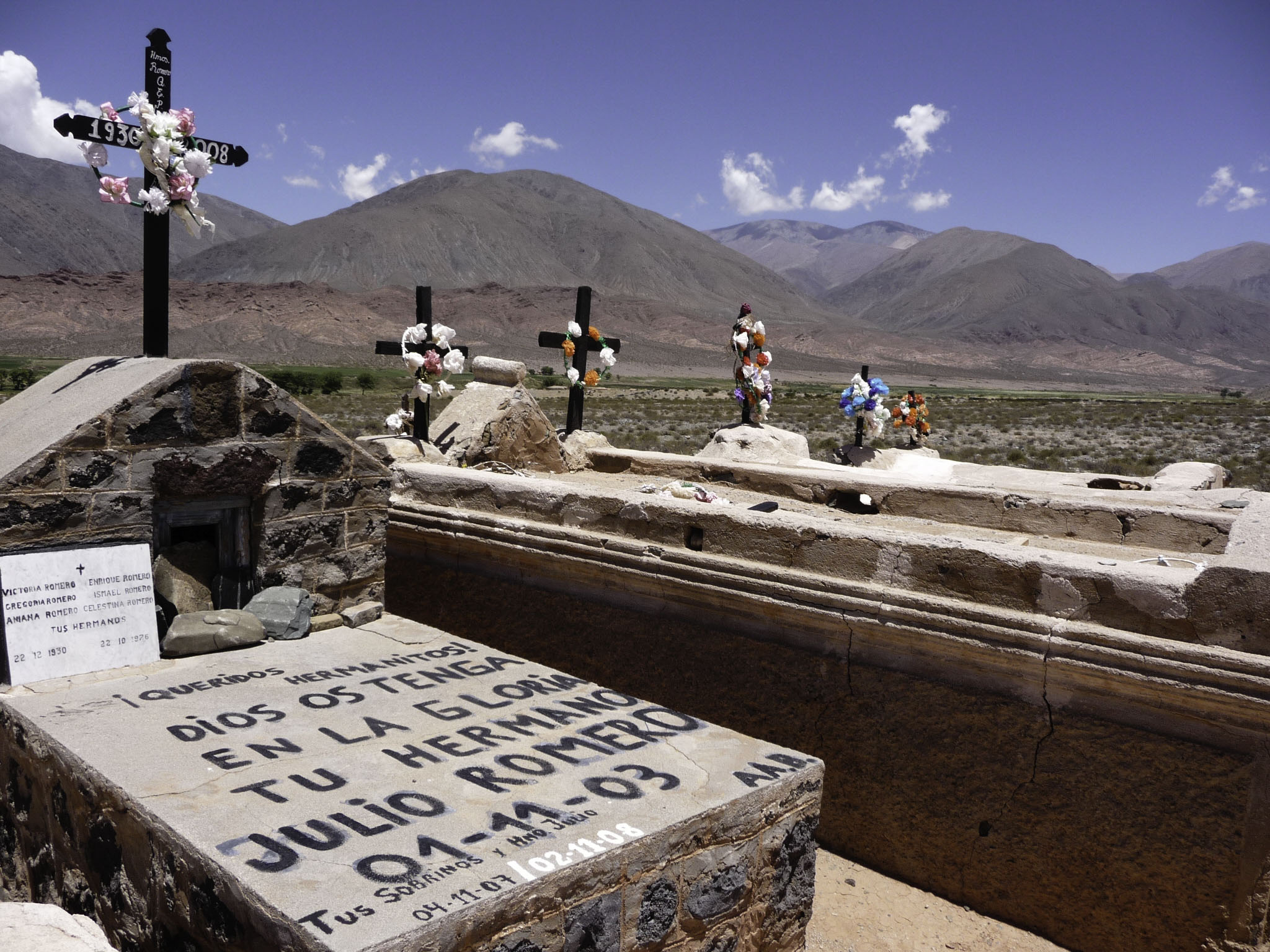
Graves along Ruta 40

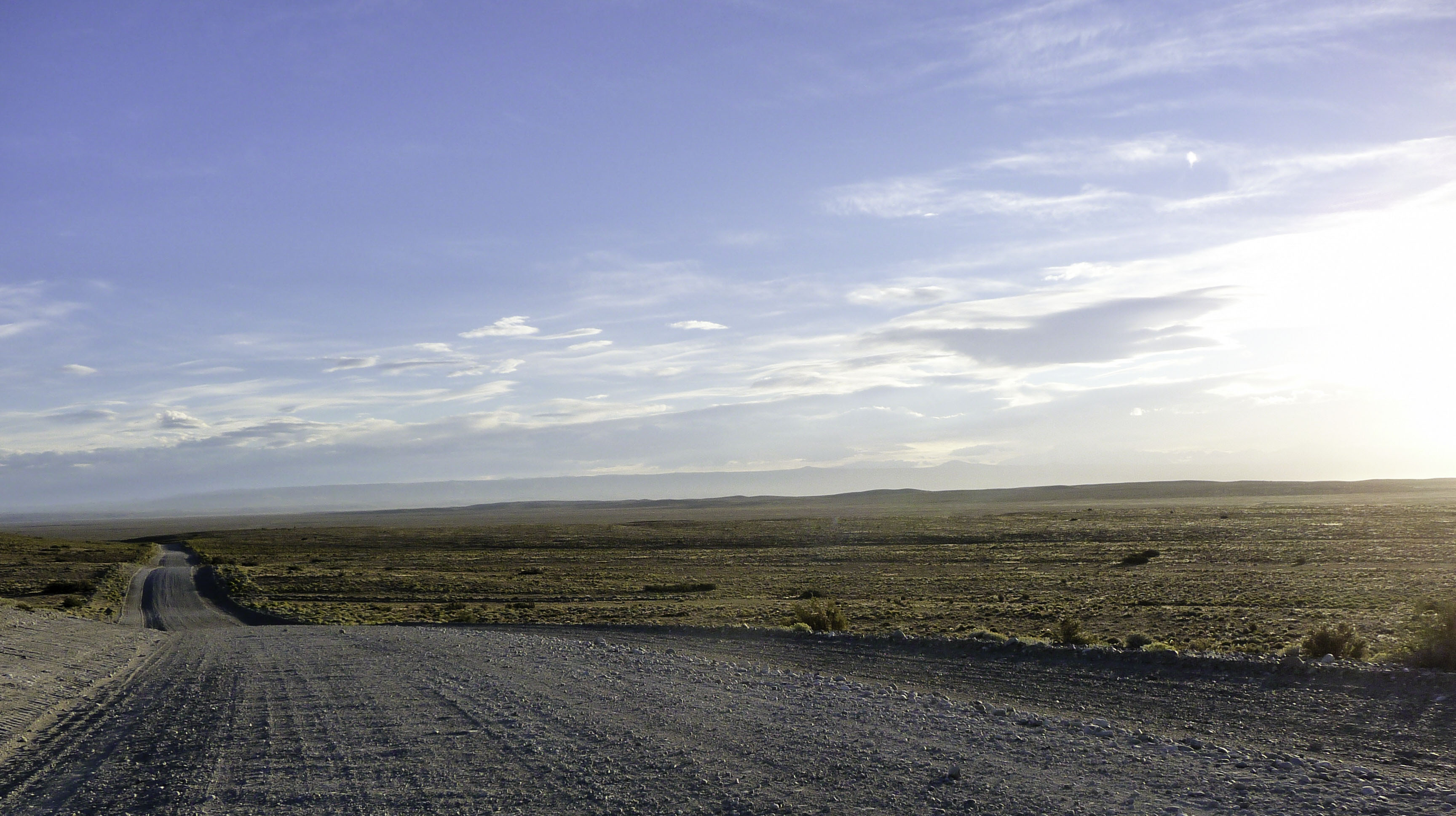
Expansive landscape on Ruta 40 in Northern Argentina

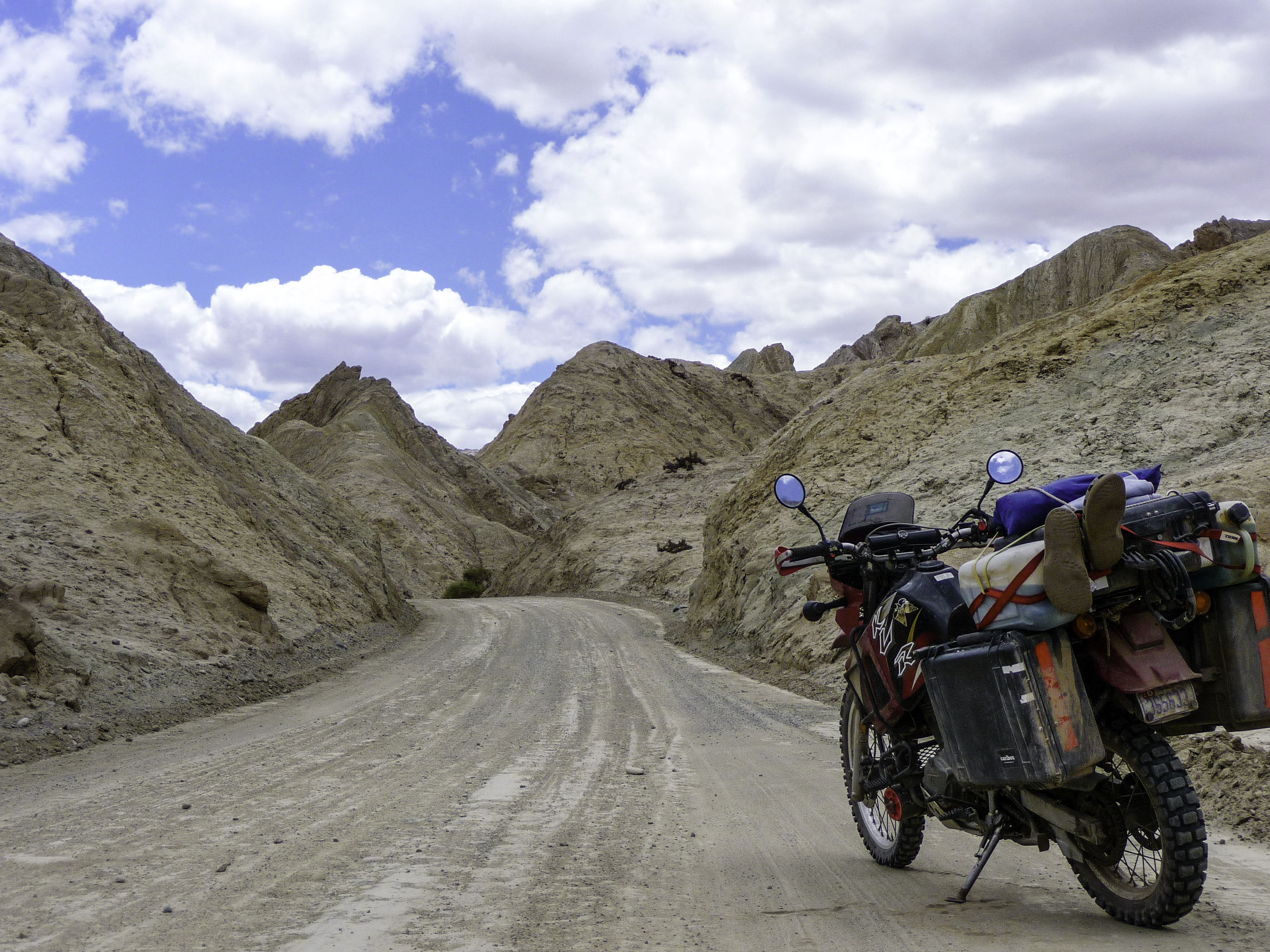
Ruta 40 and a Kawasaki KLR 650

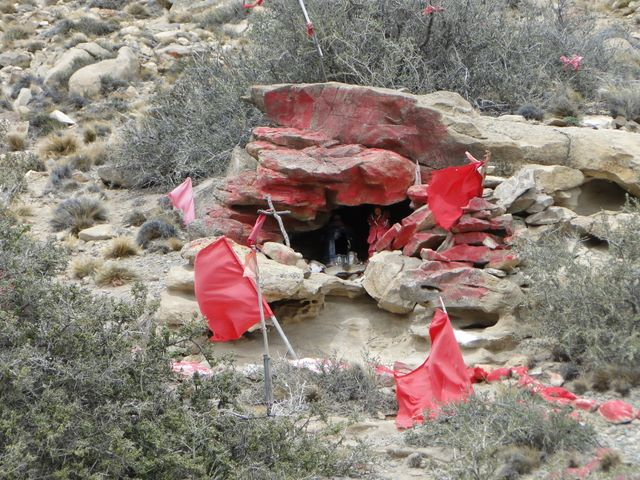
Gauchito Gil altar

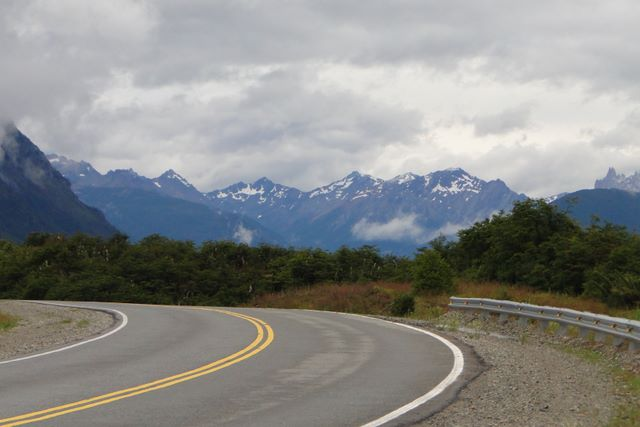
Ruta 40 near Bariloche (Argentina)

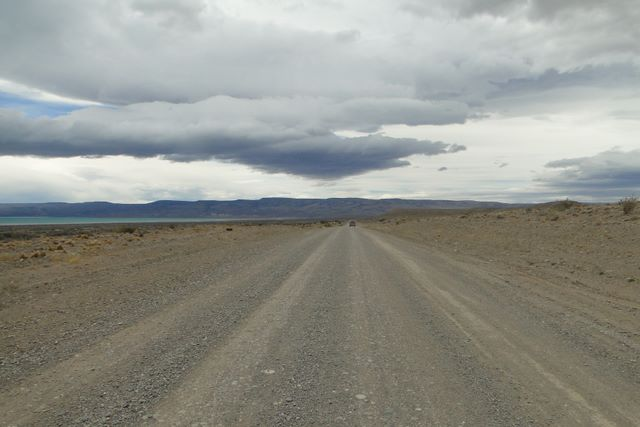
Ruta 40 near Bajo Caracoles
