= Olacapato =

- Municipality and village
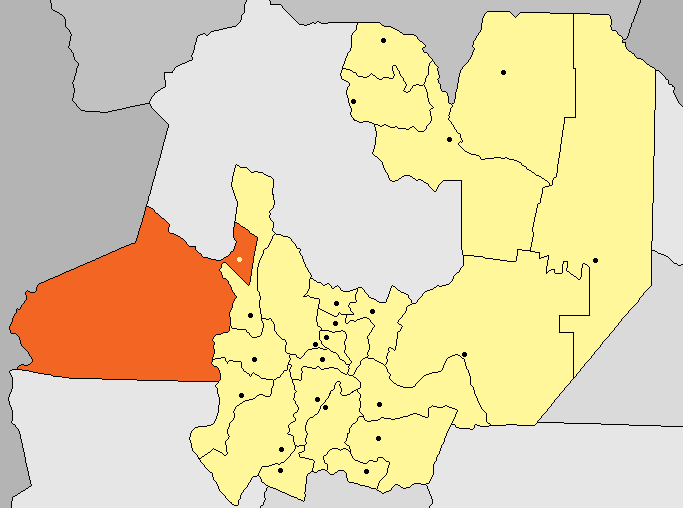

- Location within Argentina
- Coordinates: 24°06′50″S 66°43′07″W
- Country: Argentina
- Province: Salta
- Department: Los Andes
- Elevation: 4,090 m (13,420 ft)

Population (2001)
  - Total: 186
- Time zone: UTC−3 (ART)
- Postal code: A4413

Olacapato is a village and rural municipality in Salta Province in northwestern Argentina. Olacapato is one of the highest towns in Argentina (4,090 m). The previous census of 2001 indicated a population of 186 inhabitants (INDEC, 2001), appearing as a rural dispersed population.

== Climate ==
Climate data for Olacapato (1950–1990)
Month	Jan	Feb	Mar	Apr	May	Jun	Jul	Aug	Sep	Oct	Nov	Dec	Year
Daily mean °C (°F)	10.8 (51.4)	10.7 (51.3)	9.9 (49.8)	7.5 (45.5)	4.2 (39.6)	2.2 (36.0)	1.6 (34.9)	3.9 (39.0)	5.9 (42.6)	8.2 (46.8)	9.9 (49.8)	10.6 (51.1)	7.1 (44.8)
Average precipitation mm (inches)	30 (1.2)	20 (0.8)	4 (0.2)	0 (0)	0 (0)	1 (0.0)	0 (0)	0 (0)	0 (0)	0 (0)	0 (0)	9 (0.4)	64 (2.5)
Source: Instituto Nacional de Tecnología Agropecuaria

== See also ==
- Salta–Antofagasta railway
