= Aguas Calientes caldera =

Miocene caldera in Salta Province, Argentina

- Location within Argentina

Highest point
- Elevation: 4,473 m (14,675 ft)
- Coordinates: 24°15′S 66°30′W

Geography
- Location: northwest Argentina
- Parent range: Andes

Geology
- Mountain type: caldera
- Volcanic belt: Andean Volcanic Belt

Aguas Calientes is a major Miocene caldera in Salta Province, Argentina. It is in the Central Volcanic Zone of the Andes, a zone of volcanism covering southern Peru, Bolivia, northwest Argentina and northern Chile. This zone contains stratovolcanoes and calderas.

The activity of the Central Volcanic Zone is linked to the subduction of the Farallon Plate and later its splinter, the Nazca Plate, below the South American Plate. The Aguas Calientes caldera is located on a Precambrian basement that was thrust over more recent (Cretaceous and younger) layers of sediment.

Aguas Calientes caldera was the source of two major ignimbrites; the Tajamar Ignimbrite (including the Chorrillos Ignimbrite inside the caldera) and the Verde Ignimbrite. The first was erupted 10.5–10.1 Ma ago and is a body of ignimbrite of about 350 cubic kilometres (84 cu mi). The second was erupted 17.2 Ma ago and has a volume of 140–300 cubic kilometres (34–72 cu mi).

== Geography and structure ==
Aguas Calientes caldera lies in the northwestern Salta Province of Argentina, in the San Antonio de los Cobres district to the southeast of the town of the same name.

Aguas Calientes caldera is part of the Central Volcanic Zone (CVC), which is located in southern Peru, northern Chile, southwestern Bolivia and northwestern Argentina in highlands over 4,000 metres (13,000 ft) high. At least six potentially active calderas, 44 active major and 18 active minor volcanoes lie in this area, of which Lascar volcano is the most active. The largest eruption in historical times in the CVZ occurred in 1600 on Huaynaputina volcano in Peru.

Aguas Calientes caldera is a roughly circular caldera limited on the western and eastern side by north–south trending fault systems. Two superimposed calderas form the volcanic system.

Cerro Verde inside the caldera is a dome formed by the uplifting of the Verde ignimbrites in the caldera after their deposition and cooling. Cerro Aguas Calientes was formed in the same way from the Tajmar ignimbrites, conclusions based in both cases on the outward dip of the ignimbrites contained in the domes.

== Geology ==
The Central Volcanic Zone (CVZ), active mainly since the Miocene, is the volcanically active area of the Andes between 16 and 28°S. Its activity is dependent on the subduction of the Nazca Plate, previously the Farallon Plate, below the South American Plate. This subduction process is responsible for the formation of the Andes and the volcanic activity on the eastern margin of the South American continent.

Estimates of the volumes erupted and surface areas covered by the CVZ volcanoes in the Neogene vary. 7,300 cubic kilometres (1,800 cu mi) with a surface area 44,000 square kilometres (17,000 sq mi) for the latitudes 18–28°S and 30,000 cubic kilometres (7,200 cu mi) with a surface area 70,000 square kilometres (27,000 sq mi) for the latitudes north of 25°S have been calculated.

In the southern segment of the CVZ, volcanic activity has varied over time. Before 26 Ma, volcanic activity was limited to a belt 100–230 kilometres (62–143 mi) from the Peru–Chile Trench. An increased subduction rate around 26 Ma, possibly related to the breakup of the Farallon Plate and change in the subduction direction, resulted in increasing activity and eastward migration of the activity. 14.5 to 5.3 Ma the volcanic activity expanded laterally and reached a maximum 14.5 to 11.5 Ma with a width 307 kilometres (191 mi) and a maximum trench-volcano distance of 520 kilometres (320 mi). During this phase volcanism in the western part of the CVZ was effusive. 11.5–8.3 Ma the volcanism moved back westwards and after 5.3 Ma it was restricted to a narrow belt 300–470 kilometres (190–290 mi) from the trench. The currently active belt is located 240–300 kilometres (150–190 mi) east of the trench.

=== Local ===
Aguas Calientes caldera is located on the Late Neoproterozoic to Early Cambrian Puncoviscana Formation with turbiditic sandstone that was affected by metamorphism. A volcano-sedimentary Ordovician sequence of marine origin is the only other Paleozoic structure in the area. The caldera itself is located on the Precambrian-Ordovician basement.

The volcano is linked to the major Calama–Olacapato–El Toro fault system that cuts the Andean chain in a northwest–southeast direction. This system also affects the Negra Muerta volcanic complex, Cerro Tuzgle, Chimpa volcanoes and several smaller volcanic systems. The formation of this fault system and other thrust faults parallel to the Andes chain is linked to the compression and orogeny of the Andean chain since the Miocene.

=== Geologic record ===
Aguas Calientes caldera was between 11 and 10 Ma the source of large scale ignimbrite sheets. Aguas Calientes caldera is considered to be an overpressure caldera, where eruption is triggered by intrusions from the volcano sill weaken the host rocks and cause the formation of fissures.

=== Composition ===
Minerals in the Tajamar ignimbrite include biotite, hornblende, plagioclase, quartz and some augite. The eruption products are uniformly dacitic in nature. Hydrothermal alterations have generated Sb-Au and Pb-Ag-Zn deposits that may be of economic importance. These deposits occur in the form of mineralized breccia and quartz. The La Poma-Incachule mining district northeast of the caldera is part of the volcanic system and contains argentiferous galena, sphalerite, antimonite and arsenopyrite. These deposits formed through hydrothermal, deuteric alteration and supergene processes and were influenced during their formation by local fault systems.

== Eruptive history ==
Aguas Calientes caldera erupted twice dacitic ignimbrites. was the source of two major ignimbrites; the Tajamar Ignimbrite (including the Chorrillos Ignimbrite inside the caldera), and the Verde Ignimbrite. The first was erupted 10.5–10.1 Ma and is a body of ignimbrite of about 350 cubic kilometres (84 cu mi). The second was erupted 17.2 Ma and has a volume of 140–300 cubic kilometres (34–72 cu mi). The Abra de Gallo ignimbrite was formerly considered the third and erupted 10.0-10.5 Ma; Petrinovic et al. consider it part of the Tajamar ignimbrite. Both eruptions probably resulted from a disruption of the magma chamber integrity by vertical faults created through the activity of horizontal fault systems in the region. There is no evidence of plinian eruption columns in the eruption deposits and the chemistry of the deposits indicates they originated in a homogeneous magma chamber.

The first eruption, which took place 17.15 Ma, was the first caldera forming episode and the eruption occurred through a central vent. Its deposit, the Verde Ignimbrite, is pumice rich and green in colour. The deposits in thickness range from more than 520 metres (1,710 ft) on Cerro Verde to 80 metres (260 ft) in the southern outcrops. It covers a surface area of about 650 square kilometres (250 sq mi). After the eruption, the Verde ignimbrites were tectonically deformed and partly buried by the Tajamar ignimbrites.

The second eruption was more extensive and covered at a minimum 2,265 square kilometres (875 sq mi). Starting from the caldera rim, it is clearly distinguishable in two units; the intracaldera Chorrillos and the extracaldera Tajamar units which were formerly considered to be separate events. The Chorrilos deposits are gray coloured and have pumice fragments of less than 5 cm diameter; they also contain breccia lenses. The Tajmar deposits overlie the Chorrillos deposits and have a red to pale pink colour. The ash flows from the eruption flowed out of the caldera, forming flow structures similar to large lava flows. The deposits underwent some devitrification due to vapour action. This ignimbrite has a maximum thickness of 450 metres (1,480 ft) on Cerro Aguas Calientes in the caldera centre and thins to less than 100 metres (330 ft) away from the volcano.

Post-caldera activity included hydrothermal–geothermal activity and may have migrated westward to the neighbouring Quevar volcanic centre. Subsequent to the caldera formation, the caldera floor was uplifted for 800–1,000 metres (2,600–3,300 ft). Geothermal activity still occurs at the Incachule field.

== See also ==
- Geology of Chile
- List of volcanoes in Chile
- Galán
- Cerro Panizos
- Pacana Caldera
- Pastos Grandes Caldera
- Tocomar
