= Acamarachi =

Mountain in Chile

- Pili
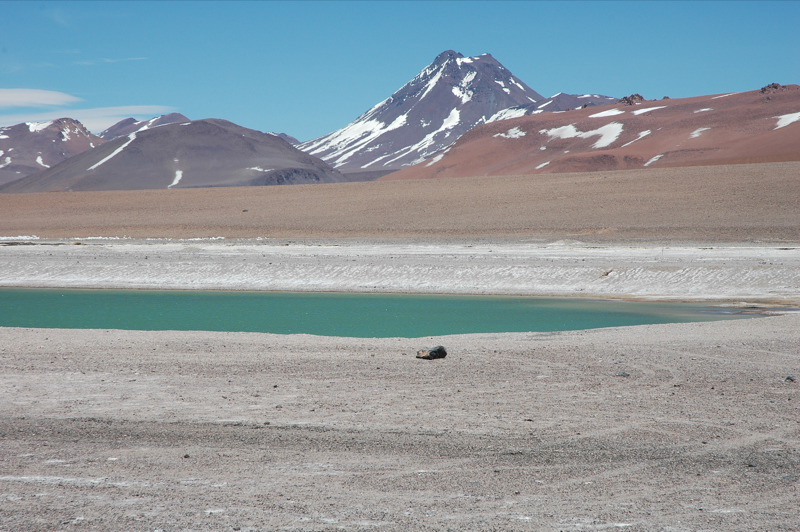
- Acamarachi viewed from the north

Highest point
- Elevation: 6,046 m (19,836 ft)
- Prominence: 1,608 m (5,276 ft)
- Parent peak: San Pedro (Chile volcano)
- Listing: Ultra
- Coordinates: 23°18′S 67°37′W

Geography
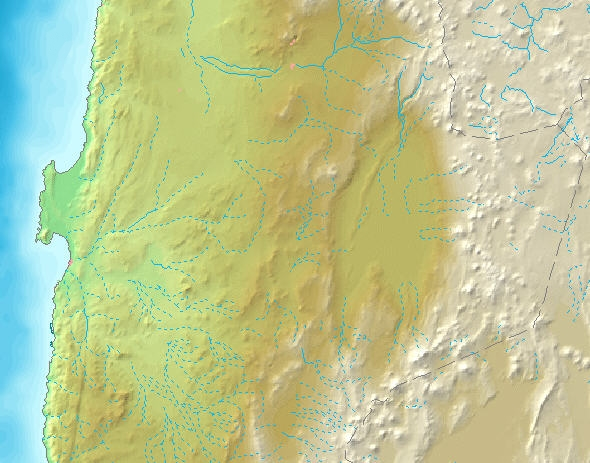
- Location within Región de Antofagasta Location within Chile Location within Argentina
- Location: Antofagasta Region, Chile
- Parent range: Andes

Geology
- Mountain type: Stratovolcano
- Last eruption: Unknown

Climbing
- First ascent: 14 March 1939 - Aldo Bonacossa and Remigio Gerard (Italy)

Acamarachi (also known as Pili) is a 6,046-metre (19,836 ft) high volcano in northern Chile. In this part of Chile, it is the highest volcano. Its name means "black moon". It is a volcano in the Central Volcanic Zone of the Andes, a zone of strong volcanic activity during the last million years. Old volcanoes in the area are well-preserved, due to the dry climate.

Acamarachi itself is a cone-shaped volcano with steep upper flanks and a lava dome on its northern side. While there is no indication of historical activity and the flank lava flows are old, some lava flows around the summit crater and a lava coulee north of Acamarachi on the saddle between Acamarachi and Colachi volcano may be postglacial in age. Acamarachi is formed by andesitic and dacitic rocks.

Acamarachi features an Inca mountain sanctuary on which several figurines have been found. One female figurine is made out of silver, a male one is made out of thorny oyster. Both of these figurines were found with miniature clothing.

== Geological context ==
The volcano is located in the Central Volcanic Zone, an area of volcanism in the Andes. Volcanism in this area is dependent on the subduction in the Peru-Chile Trench. 27 million years ago, in this area of the Andes large rhyolitic eruptions commenced and formed major ignimbrites, dramatically increasing 10 million years ago. At the same time starting in the Miocene, andesitic to dacitic eruptive activity has formed large stratovolcanoes. This activity in the late Pleistocene and Holocene has created the current volcanic arc.

The climate of the area is hyperarid. Thus, ignimbrites and individual volcanoes keep most of their original appearance. Most of these volcanoes are remote structures that are unlikely to affect significant population, although wind-driven transport of tephra can potentially cause economic and other damage at considerable distance.

== Geology ==
Acamarachi is a 6,046 metres (19,836 ft) high (Note: Other data from digital elevation models: SRTM yields 6,024 metres (19,764 ft), ASTER 5,971 metres (19,590 ft), SRTM filled with ASTER6,024 metres (19,764 ft), ALOS 5,971 metres (19,590 ft) and TanDEM-X 6,050 metres (19,850 ft).) (Note: The height of the nearest key col is 4,438 metres (14,560 ft), leading to a topographic prominence of 1,608 metres (5,276 ft) with a topographical dominance of 26.6%. Its parent peak is San Pedro and the Topographic isolation is 175.3 kilometres (108.9 mi).) steep-sided conical volcano, like several other volcanoes in the region. Such a shape is due to the relatively high viscosity of the lavas forming them. In the case of Acamarachi, the upper slopes reach a slope angle of 45°. On the volcano's northern flank there is a large lava dome while the rest of the edifice is symmetrical. A 10–15 metres (33–49 ft) deep crater lake lies in the summit crater and may be kept ice-free by magmatic heat. As of 2021, it is considered the world's highest site of an underwater dive.

Acamarachi is constructed by andesite and dacite. Rocks are porphyritic and contain hornblende as well as biotite or pyroxene. Augite, hypersthene and plagioclase are also present, with smaller contents of olivine and quartz. The composition of Acamarachi's rocks resembles that of Colachi's.

A study of lava flows at the summit concluded that Acamarachi's last eruption may have occurred during the Holocene. There are no young lava flows on the flanks and the summit crater is degraded. Possibly after the ice ages, north of Acamarachi a silicic coulee was erupted on the saddle between Acamarachi and Colachi. This coulee has well preserved flow structures and covers 7 kilometres (4.3 mi). No evidence exists for activity in historical times and the lack of volcanic damage to archeological sites suggests that it was active during the last millennium. Renewed activity would most likely generate lava flows or lava domes; impact would be limited on the immediate surroundings of the volcano.

The volcano is part of a northwest-bound alignment along with Rili, Colachi and Yalquis-Putas, which may be linked to faults underground. However, Colachi and Acamarachi seem to have separate magmatic systems. They are both relatively low over the surrounding terrain which is about 4,800 metres (15,700 ft) high and is formed by raised ignimbrites.

Acamarachi does not have glaciers or any perennial ice structures. Such lack of glaciation is also observed on other mountains in the neighbourhood such as Aucanquilcha and is probably due to the arid climate. In the past however the mountain was probably extensively glaciated, with glacier lobes forming at its foot and cirques developing around the summit. Terminal moraines lie in the Quebrada Ojos de Hécar and Quebrada Acamarachi, with several individual moraines between 4,500–5,000 metres (14,800–16,400 ft) elevation.

== Archeology ==
Acamarachi is known as an Inca mountain sanctuary, among at a minimum 15 other mountain sanctuaries known to have been used by the Inca. Other known sanctuaries are Cerro Colorado, Cerro Lailay, Cerro del Leon, Cerro Mullay, Cerro Toco, Cerro Quimal, Curiquinca, Juriques, Laguna Verde, Licancabur, Linzor, Paniri, Sairecabur, Tatio and Toconce. On its summit, four different ceremonial platforms are arranged in a cloverleaf conformation.

Inca figurines representing individuals of various sexes have been found on Acamarachi. The figurines found at Acamarachi may represent mid-level imperial officials, considering the simple tunics they wore. One figurine made out of Spondylus shell wore miniature clothing made out of camelid wool, the clothing having an imperial design with multicoloured decorations. The tunic itself is yellow. The textiles found on Acamarachi belong to a style known as "Catarpe", which is associated with Inca presence. Such clothing seems to be miniaturized versions of Inca clothing. This figurine has no plaque, unlike some other Inca figurines. A feather and a shawl are other accessories that have been found on the figurine. The function of such figurines is unknown, several theories have been proposed, such as representing deities. Another figurine representing a woman was also found there in 1971, in red miniature clothing with decorations too, as well as a red feather. This figure is made out of silver. Such dressed figurines have been found on other Andean summits, such as Aconcagua, Cerro El Plomo, Cerro Mercedario, Cerro Las Tortolas, Cerro Gallan, Copiapo and Pichu Pichu. Acamarachi's figurines are now exposed in the R. P. Gustavo Le Paige Archaeological Museum of San Pedro de Atacama.

The region in which Acamarachi is located was a southern part of the Inca Empire. A major Inca road passed by the town of Toconao, not far from Acamarachi.

== See also ==
- List of volcanoes in Chile
- List of stratovolcanoes
- List of Ultras of South America
- List of Andean peaks with known pre-Columbian ascents

== Sources ==
- Agüero, Carolina P. (2000). "Fragmentos para armar un territorio. La textiler í a en Atacama durante los per í odos Intermedio Tardío y Tardío" (PDF). Estudios Atacameños (in Spanish) (20): 7–28. doi:10.22199/S07181043.2000.0020.00002. Archived from the original (PDF) on 13 August 2016.
- Thomas Besom (15 April 2013). Inka Human Sacrifice and Mountain Worship: Strategies for Empire Unification. UNM Press. ISBN 978-0-8263-5308-5.
- Penny Dransart (1995). Elemental Meanings: Symbolic Expression in Inka Miniature Figurines (PDF). Institute of Latin American Studies. ISBN 978-1-900039-00-0.
