= Toconce (volcano) =

Volcano in Chile

Coordinates: 22°11′17″S 68°04′43″W

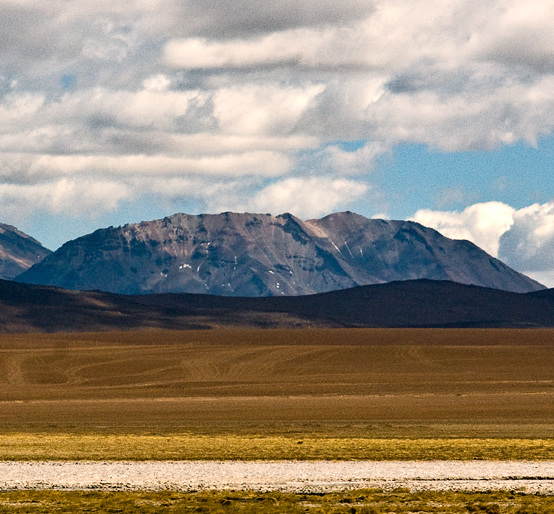
- Toconce.

Highest point
- Elevation: 5,335 m (17,503 ft)

Geography
- Location within Chile

Toconce is a volcano in Chile.

Toconce volcano has a central crater and is constructed mainly by andesitic lava flows, which were emplaced during three different stages. The last stage generated the bulk of the volcanic edifice. The volcano was glaciated between 15,000 - 11,000 years ago and this has resulted in glacial erosion and the development of moraines above 4,300 metres (14,100 ft) elevation. The glacial erosion has excavated a number of glacial valleys on the volcano, and hydrothermally altered rocks from inside the edifice have been exposed.

Toconce volcano is constructed atop the Toconce and Sifon ignimbrites. These ignimbrites belong to a dacite-rhyolite ignimbrite sequence which many volcanoes in the Central Andes are constructed on. The ignimbrite sequences together with the stratovolcanoes form the volcanic arc in the Central Andes, which here constitutes the Central Volcanic Zone. The relatively small Tolar ignimbrite was erupted from Toconce volcano, over 1.3 million years ago.

The San Pedro-Linzor chain of volcanoes is a chain of volcanoes of late Pleistocene-Holocene age that is parallel to several other chains of volcanoes in the region but perpendicular to the main volcanic arc. Aside from Toconce, it includes San Pedro, San Pablo, Paniri, Cerro del León and Linzor, covering a length of 65 kilometres (40 mi). One sample from Toconce has been dated to 1.1 ± 0.1 million years before present. These volcanoes are composed by pyroclastics and scoria as well as lava domes and lava flows and are mostly andesitic; however the entire spectrum of lavas from basaltic andesite to dacite can be encountered there.

The rocks at Toconce are formed primarily by plagioclase and glass, with amphibole, biotite, pyroxene and quartz making up the rest. The volcanic sequence belongs to the potassium rich calc-alkaline series. Hydrothermal alteration has given rise to clay, oxidation products and sericite. Obsidian was quarried on the mountain.
