= Ancuaque =

Town in Chile

Coordinates: 19°31′30″S 68°43′19″W

- Town
- Ancuaque
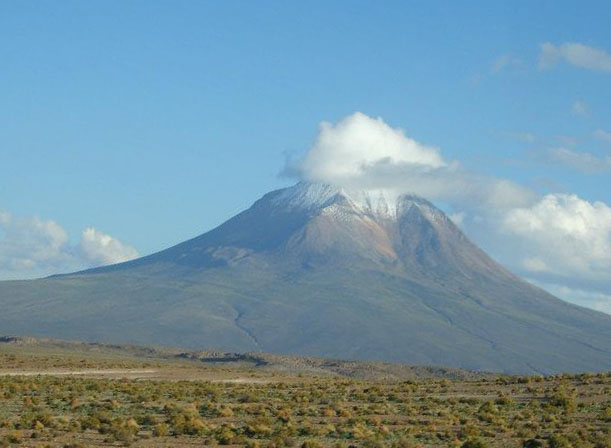

- Country: Chile
- Region: Tarapacá Region
- Region: El Tamarugal

Ancuaque is a small Aymara town in Chile. It is situated in the highlands of the Tarapacá Region (Chile), located 37 km from Colchane and 10 km from Cariquima. Its inhabitants live from agriculture, livestock, crafts and tourism.

== Tourism ==
Ancuaque is located on the slopes of Nevado Cariquima or Mama Huanapa, in addition, through the thakhinaka patha route, you can cross the Sillajhuay mountain range, reaching the town of Lirima.
