= Collacagua =

Town in Chile

- Town
- Collacagua
- Coat of arms

- Coordinates: 20°02′21″S 68°49′47″W
- Country: Chile
- Region: Tarapacá Region
- Province: El Tamarugal
- Communes: Pica
- Area code: (+56) 5

Collacagua is a Chilean town. It is a small Aymara hamlet in the highlands of the Tarapacá Region (Chile). Collacagua is located 86 km from Pica, between the towns of Cancosa and Lirima. The houses of which the oldest are made of stone, adobe and mud. The latter are similar to the ancestral Aymara architectural style but their materials are not the same.

Its inhabitants make their living from agriculture and livestock, in addition to tourism.
