= Cancosa paleolake =

Former lake at Cancosa, Chile

Coordinates: 19°50′S 68°40′W

The paleolake of Cancosa is a former lake at Cancosa, Chile. The existence of the lake was inferred on the basis of limnic sediments in the area, which lies in the Tarapacá Region of Chile.

Presently, the area is occupied by a basin at about 3,950 metres (12,960 ft) altitude within the Western Cordillera and surrounded by high mountains, such as Cerro Porquesa and Sillajhuay. The area is arid (precipitation less than 200 millimetres per year (7.9 in/year)) owing to the rain shadow of the Andes and the influence of the South Pacific High; most precipitation falls during summer.

The lake has been reconstructed on the basis of data obtained by analyzing its sediments and the biological traits of diatoms found therein. Water levels varied through its history, with the lake occasionally becoming bog-like. Most of the time, the lake reached depths of only a few meters, and it was a calm water body. Radiocarbon dating shows that shallowing occurred in the middle Holocene between 4,700 - 3,700 BP, coinciding with the mid-Holocene lowstand of Lake Titicaca. Afterwards lake levels increased until 3,000 BP; subsequently a lake level drop becomes noticeable by 1,000 BP and about 700 years before present the lake finally drained to the Salar de Coipasa, for reasons unknown although it is possible that the Rio Cancosa at that point breached the lake basin.

Presently, a few salt lakes occur in the Cancosa basin. The Cancosa River, which forms at the confluence of the Saccaya River and Ocacucho River, drains the basin today. These rivers cut into the lake sediments and are the only perennial rivers today in the area. The Cancosa River ultimately drains into the Salar de Coipasa.

The lake featured a diverse diatom flora, with over 98 taxa represented. Among the most common taxa found in lake deposits are Achnanthes lanceolata, Fragilaria capucina and Naviculadicta chilensis. Most diatoms identified are periphytic and there are no planktonic species. The lake was sometimes eutrophic and sometimes not, which may reflect volcanic influence on its waters.
