= Chijo =

Town in Chile

Coordinates: 19°26′36″S 68°34′50″W

- Town
- Chijo
- Country: Chile
- Region: Tarapacá Region
- Province: El Tamarugal
- Area code: (+56) 5

Chijo is a Chilean town. It is a few kilometers east of Cariquima, in the Tarapacá Region, Chile. It is located in the Commune of Colchane. It is a small town of houses with a wild thatched roof and a small church dating from the 18th century. Quinoa, broad beans and quinces are grown in the town, in addition to the typical potato plantation.
