= Paniri =

Mountain in Chile

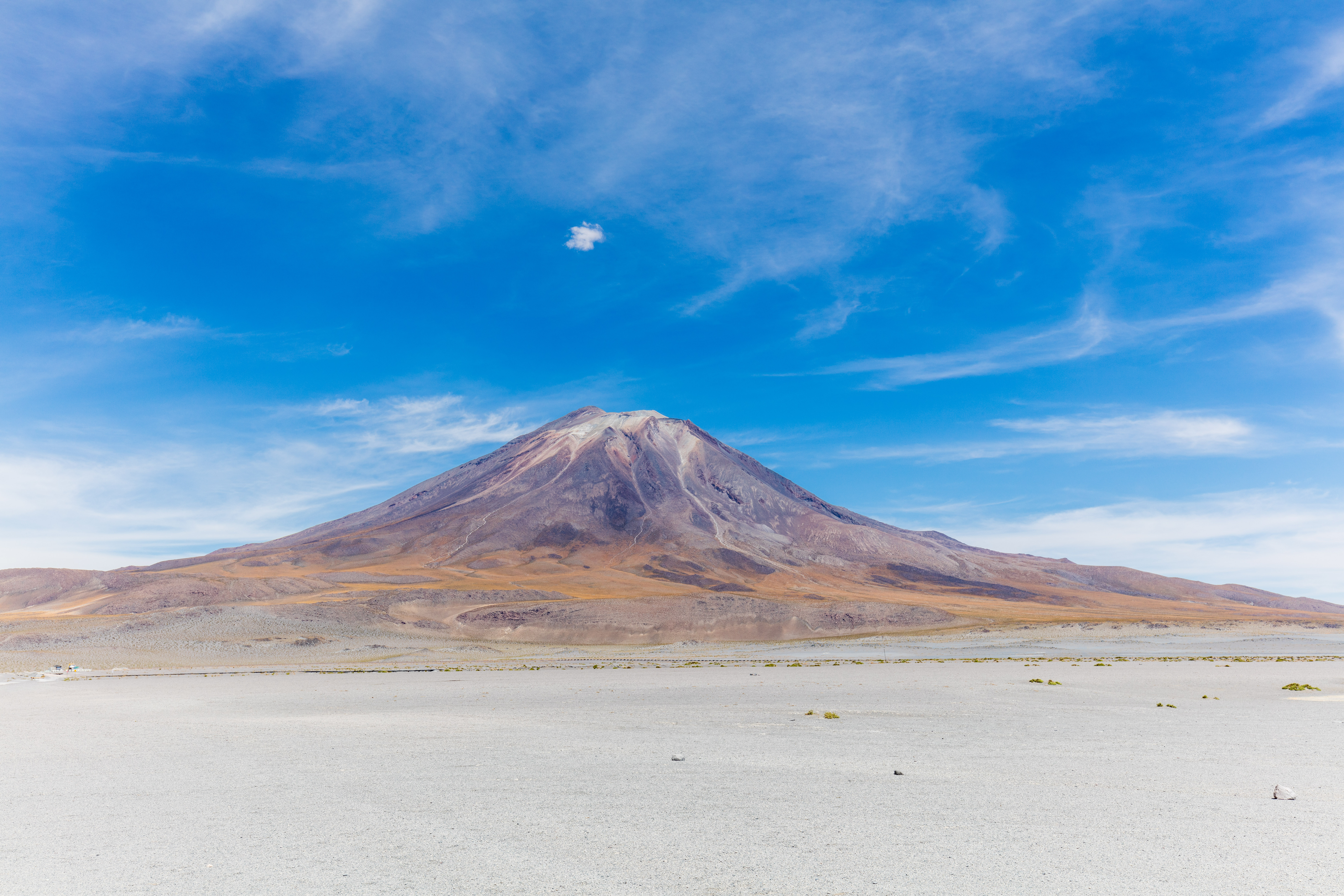

Highest point
- Elevation: 5,960 m (19,550 ft)
- Prominence: 1,653 m (5,423 ft)
- Parent peak: San Pedro
- Listing: Ultra
- Coordinates: 22°03′33″S 68°13′42″W

Geography
- Location within Chile
- Location: Antofagasta, Chile
- Parent range: Andes

Geology
- Mountain type: Stratovolcano
- Last eruption: Unknown

Climbing
- First ascent: pre-Columbian

Paniri (Aymara for "he who comes, visits") is a stratovolcano located in El Loa Province, Antofagasta Region, Chile, and near the border with Bolivia. To its northwest lie the twin volcanoes San Pedro and San Pablo, and to its southeast lies Cerro del León, from which it is separated by the huge Chao lava dome.

The volcano features lava flows, which are well preserved on the south-southwest flanks, and a scoria cone on its summit. The volcano has three craters. Paniri also shows evidence of glacier activity on its southeastern slope. The volcano developed in several different stages with substages; the first stage formed a shield like volcano with most of its volume, the later ones formed the cone and "main edifice". One date obtained from the youngest stage is 150,000 years ago, with an uncertainty of 6,000 years. Once considered of Holocene or Pleistocene age, Paniri was later determined that to be of Pleistocene age.

Paniri is part of the San Pedro-Linzor volcanic chain, a chain of volcanoes formed by lava flows and pyroclastic flows. Composition of the rocks erupted by Paniri ranges from basaltic andesite and dacite.

== Geography and geomorphology ==
Paniri lies in the Antofagasta Province of Chile. The volcano rises between Cerro Carcanal in the west and Cerro del Leon in the east. Roads lead around the northern and western flanks of the volcano. The large lava flow Cerro Chao borders Paniri to the southeast and separates it from Cerro del Leon. The towns of Cupo and Turi lie west-southwest and south-southwest of Paniri, respectively.

Paniri is part of the Central Volcanic Zone, a volcanic belt in the Andes. Other than Paniri, other volcanoes in the Central Volcanic Zone are Lascar, Sabancaya and Ubinas, as well as geothermal fields such as El Tatio.

The volcano is formed by about two units and contains three summit craters and one vent; one of the craters contains a crater lake with dimensions of 6 by 12 metres (20 ft × 39 ft). The volcano is topped off with a scoria cone. Thick lava flows extend from the summit and form the foot of Paniri. Gullies cut into its slopes and moraines have developed around its summit.

== Geology ==
Since the Jurassic, the Nazca Plate has been subducting beneath the western margin of South America. This subduction process is responsible for the volcanism in the Central Volcanic Zone of the Andes, one of four volcanic arcs in the Andes.

The volcano is mainly of Pleistocene age, but well preserved surface features indicate it may be still active. Other parts of the volcano have been subject to glacial erosion and hydrothermal alteration, and evaporite deposits have formed on its feet.

The basement that Paniri is constructed on consists of both Oligocene-Miocene sediments of the San Pedro formation and ignimbrites of Miocene age which are formed by rhyodacitic and rhyolitic material. Atop this basement Paniri developed together with other volcanoes such as Cerro Chao in a linear volcanic chain, the San Pedro-Linzor complex which is formed by lava flows and pyroclastic flows and whose existence may be due to a tectonic lineament. The chain is made up by San Pedro, San Pablo, Paniri, Cerro Chao, Cerro de Leon, Toconce and Linzor.

Paniri has erupted rocks ranging from basaltic andesite to rhyolite, which mainly define a potassium-rich calc-alkaline volcanic suite. Phenocrysts include biotite, clinopyroxene, hornblende, olivine, opaque minerals, orthopyroxene, plagioclase, quartz and rutile; the exact composition varies between various units. Alteration of the erupted rocks has given rise to clay, chlorite, epidote and illite. Magma genesis at Paniri appears to involve both the assimilation of crustal rocks in the Altiplano-Puna volcanic complex and fractional crystallization processes in shallow magma chambers.

== Life and human history ==
The fairy shrimp Branchinecta brushi was discovered in 2009 in the crater lake of Paniri. The occurrence of this shrimp at Paniri made it the highest finding of crustaceans known.

Native people, considered to be Inka, made the first ascents of this mountain. Claudio Lucero and Nelson Muñoz made the first recorded ascent of Paniri in 1972. They found archaeological remains on its summit, which along with similar sanctuaries at Licancabur and other mountains are considered to be of Inka origin. Paniri is the sacred mountain for the village of Ayquina, and was also used as a source of dacitic rocks.

== Eruptive history ==
The first units erupted by Paniri are the mainly lavic (plus one pyroclastic deposit) Malku unit which crops out in the northwestern sector of the volcano and the Los Gordos unit. The Los Gordos unit consists of pyroclastics and brecciated lava flows which are much thicker than these of the Malku unit; they crop out north and northwest of Paniri and one date obtained from this unit is 1.39 ± 0.28 million years ago. These two units define the "shield" stage of Paniri, the longest lasting and most voluminous phase of volcanic activity at this volcano.

Afterwards, the widespread Las Lenguas unit was emplaced which consists of blocky lava flows with some thin pyroclastic deposits. Ages of 640,000 ± 140,000 to 400,000 ± 100,000 have been obtained by radiometric dating. More restricted in exposure is the Las Negras unit, which forms basalt-andesite lava flows with prominent levees on the northwestern flank of Paniri (one of these is dated to 402,000 ± 46,000 years ago). This is considered to be the "main edifice" stage of volcano growth at Paniri.

The last three units of Paniri are the Viscachas, Laguna and Llareta units. The former consists of lava flows on the southeastern flank, with dates of 325,000 ± 8,000 and 300,000 ± 100,000 years before present. The Laguna unit again features lava flows but also breccia and pyroclastic material, and one age of 169,000 ± 5,000 was obtained on its rocks. The last unit, Llareta, was erupted by the summit vent which generated lava flows on the northeastern and southwestern sectors of the volcano, plus large pyroclastic bombs. Its age ranges 264,000 ± 99,000 to 150,000 ± 6,000 years before present. These are considered to be the Old Cone and New Cone stages of volcano growth. The volcano was formerly considered to be of Holocene age. Electric conductivity anomalies imply that there is still a geothermal system under Paniri; a magma chamber may not be sufficiently visible.

== See also ==
- List of volcanoes in Chile
- San Pedro de Inacaliri River
- Salado River
- List of Ultras of South America
- List of andean peaks with known pre-columbian ascents
