= Pica gap =

Pica gap is a segment in the Central Volcanic Zone of Chile where volcanic activity is absent. It is named after the Altos de Pica region.

This segment is 100 kilometres (62 mi) long and extends between the volcanoes Isluga in the north and Irruputuncu in the south. Volcanoes in the gap are old, Miocene to Pliocene in age and are heavily eroded. Examples include Cerro Napa, Cerro Cariquima and Cerro Tatjachura.

At the latitude of the Pica gap, an underwater rise known as the Iquique rise is subducted in the Peru-Chile Trench. It is unclear if the subduction of this rise is the cause for the lack of recent volcanism in the Pica gap. The lack of volcanism in the Pica gap appears to be due to unfavourable mantle flow patterns, which prevent the ascent of magma.

Geologically, the Pica gap lies between two crustal domains which are defined by their divergent lead isotope ratios, the northerly Arequipa-Antofalla block of Proterozoic age and the southern Chilenia terrane of Paleozoic age. Other phenomena which coincide with the Pica gap are the absence of tectonic horsts west of the Andes, an area where a zone of high electrical conductivity in the deep crust beneath the forearc does not extend to the actual volcanic arc (and thus may reflect the absence of molten magma), the lack of a low seismic velocity zone in the crust, a symmetry plane of the Andes, the Salar de Uyuni basin behind the arc and the location of the actual bend in the Andes that is usually placed at the Arica Bend. These phenomena may be unrelated to the Pica gap, however.

The Cerro Porquesa lava dome and ignimbrite are the only volcanic centres with late Pleistocene activity in the area. Some evidence of recent volcanic activity exists at the Pliocene volcano Sillajuhay, where geothermal activity and deformation of the ground were observed.
