= Sillajhuay =

Volcano in Bolivia and Chile

- Alto Toroni, Sillajguay
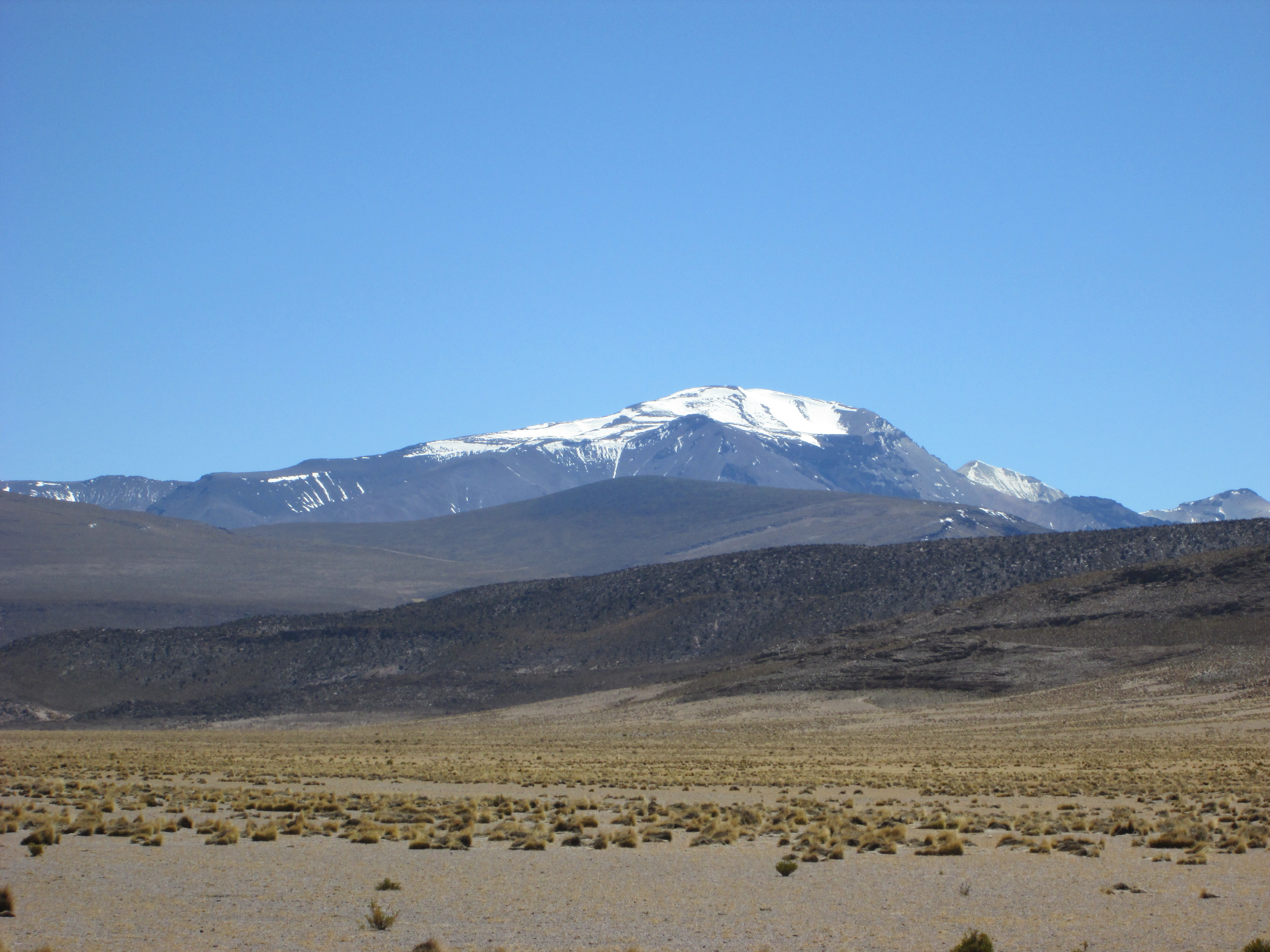
- Sillajhuay seen from the west

Highest point
- Elevation: 5,982 m (19,626 ft)
- Prominence: 1,733 m (5,686 ft)
- Parent peak: Nevado Sajama
- Listing: Ultra,
- Coordinates: 19°44′32″S 68°41′26″W

Geography
- Location within Bolivia
- Location: Bolivia–Chile border;Oruro, Arica y Parinacota
- Parent range: Andes

Geology
- Rock age: Pliocene-recent
- Mountain type: Volcano
- Volcanic zone: Central Volcanic Zone

Climbing
- First ascent: pre columbian but first recorded ascent 1926 - Friedrich Adolf Ernest Ahlfeld (Germany)

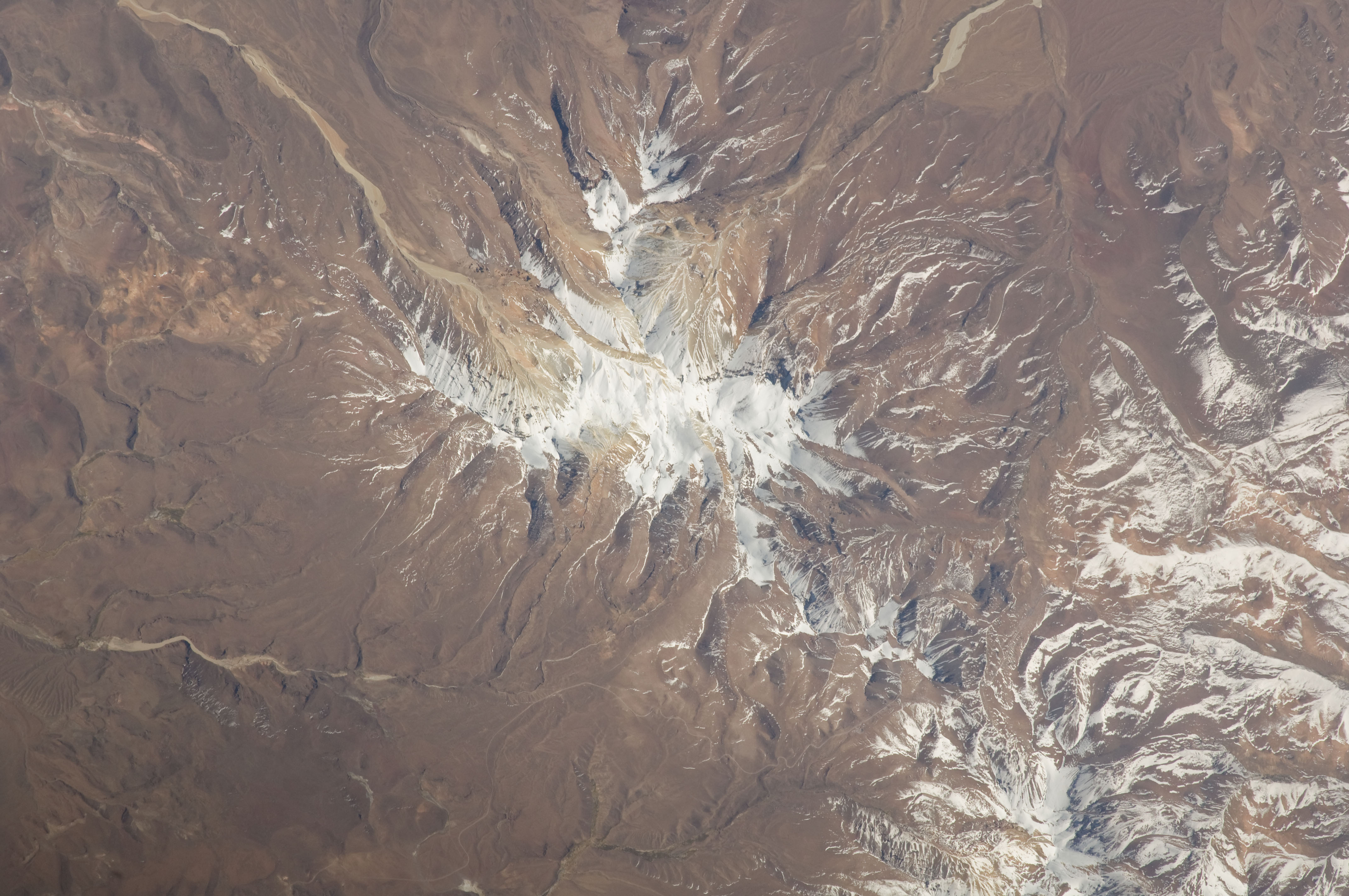
Sillajhuay seen from ISS

Sillajhuay (also known as Sillajguay or Alto Toroni) is a volcano on the border between Bolivia and Chile. It is part of a volcanic chain that stretches across the border between Bolivia and Chile and forms a mountain massif that is in part covered by ice; whether this ice should be considered a glacier is debatable but it has been retreating in recent decades.

The volcano has developed on top of older ignimbrites. The volcano was active within the last one million years, but not within recent times considering the heavy glacial erosion of the mountain and the widespread periglacial modifications. Non-eruptive activity however occurs in the form of surface deformation and earthquake activity.

== Geography and geomorphology ==
Sillajhuay is located in the Andes on the border between Bolivia and Chile (commune of Pica-Colchane, Tarapaca Region) although only a small easterly sector of the mountain is located in Bolivia. The volcano lies in a thinly inhabited region; the towns of Cancosa and Villa Blanca lie 16 kilometres (9.9 mi) southeast and 18 kilometres (11 mi) northeast of Sillajhuay, respectively, and a road runs west of the volcano. The volcano is also known as Alto Toroni, Sillajguay, or sometimes Candelaria. The name "Sillajhuay" means "devil's chair" in Aymara but the part silla may also refer to sila which means llama.

About 50 different volcanoes and geothermal features have been active in the Central Andes during the Holocene, with earthquakes observed at Guallatiri, Irruputuncu, Isluga, Lascar, Olca, Parinacota and Putana. Most volcanoes of the Central Volcanic Zone (CVZ) are relatively poorly researched and many exceed 5,000 metres (16,000 ft) of elevation. Some of these volcanoes were active during historical time; these include El Misti, Lascar, San Pedro and Ubinas; the largest historical eruption of the CVZ occurred in 1600 at Huaynaputina. Other volcanoes in the CVZ that have been the subject of research are Galan and the Purico complex. The CVZ has a characteristically thick crust (50–70 kilometres (31–43 mi)) and the volcanic rocks have peculiar oxygen and strontium isotope ratios in comparison to the Southern Volcanic Zone (SVZ) and the Northern Volcanic Zone (NVZ).

The mountain is most commonly stated to be maximally 5,995 metres (19,669 ft) high, but a higher heights or a lower height of 5,982 metres (19,626 ft) are also possible. (Note: Other data from digital elevation models: SRTM yields 5,981 metres (19,623 ft), ASTER 5,966 metres (19,573 ft), SRTM filled with ASTER5,981 metres (19,623 ft), ALOS 5,966 metres (19,573 ft) and TanDEM-X 6,023 metres (19,760 ft).) (Note: The height of the nearest key col is 4,262 metres (13,983 ft), leading to a topographic prominence of 1,733 metres (5,686 ft) with a topographical dominance of 28.91%. Its parent peak is Sajama and the Topographic isolation is 183.8 kilometres (114.2 mi).) It is the highest peak in the region. Sillajhuay is part of a larger massif that rises 2,000 metres (6,600 ft) above the surrounding flat pedimented terrain to a median elevation of 5,030 metres (16,500 ft) elevation. Subsidiary summits in the massif include the 5,060 metres (16,600 ft) high Cerro Carvinto southwest of Sillajhuay, the 5,403 metres (17,726 ft) Cerro Picavilque west-northwest of Sillajhuay, 5,234 metres (17,172 ft) high Cerro Irpa southeast, Cerro Candelaria due east and 5,874 metres (19,271 ft) Morro Chuncaron and Alto Totoni northeast. Generally, the massif is elongated northeastwards and its summit region is poorly accessible. Above 4,100 metres (13,500 ft) elevation, glaciation has eroded the massif and thus the volcano is heavily degraded with no recognizable craters; below that elevation volcanic landforms are more clearly expressed. The volcano was the source of 30–90 metres (98–295 ft) thick lava flows that reached lengths of about 14–5 kilometres (8.7–3.1 mi) and valleys occur all around it. Farther west lie the Cerros de Quimsachata which form a volcanic chain with Sillajhuay.

=== Glaciation ===
Firn including penitentes occurs on the mountain at elevations of over 5,750 metres (18,860 ft) and is visible over large distances but there are no presently active, moving glaciers unless they are buried beneath a snow cover. Some sources consider Sillajhuay's firn a glacier however, in which case it would be considered to be the southernmost glacier north of the Arid Diagonal of the Andes. Between 1989 and 2011 the firn lost over half of its surface, interrupted by some small advances, and further retreat is likely. Ice loss between 2000 and 2003 amounted to about 0.03 square kilometres (0.012 sq mi).

In the past during the Late Quaternary, the mountain was more extensively glaciated, with about nine glaciers surrounding it including a subsidiary summit to the south. Former glaciers did reach lengths of 11 kilometres (6.8 mi) and their tongues descended to elevations of 4,240 metres (13,910 ft) on the northern, eastern and southern flanks; they have left well developed glacial striae, glacial valleys and various types of moraines. The lowest moraines are found on the eastern flank, with the northern flanks having the highest moraines and the southern flank moraines reaching intermediate elevations. Some ancient tills have been overrun by porphyries. The extent of glacial erosion suggests that at least two stages of glaciation occurred at Sillajhuay.

Some rock glaciers are found on the southern side of Sillajhuay and mostly in the Rincon Tucuruma valley; they occur at elevations of 5,200 metres (17,100 ft) and the longest reaches a length of 500 metres (1,600 ft). Solifluction landforms and other surfaces generated by periglacial processes are common on the southern and northern-northwestern flanks of the massif.

=== Hydrography ===
Erosion has cut steep valleys into the massif; these include clockwise the Rio Blanco southeast, Ricon Tacurma south, Quebrada Mina Chucha southwest, Quebrada Seca northwest and Quebrada Quisimachiri north-northwest of the volcano. These valleys reach up to the summit plateau and contain perennial rivers; additional valleys contain ephemeral streams, and they are often linked to alluvial fans down where eroded material has been deposited. Sulfurous springs are active on the massif.

The valleys descending the volcano have steep slopes, the Rio Blanco valley for example has a 1.1 kilometres (0.68 mi) drop over 2 kilometres (1.2 mi). All the drainages from Sillajhuay eventually flow eastward towards the Salar de Coipasa. On the southern flank of Sillajhuay, the Rio Blanco and the Ricon Tacurma drain into the Rio Ocacucho; there was formerly a lake known as the Cancosa paleolake south of Sillajhuay. There is evidence that during the middle Pleistocene, a landslide from Sillajhuay dammed the Rio Cancosa and generated a body of water, into which the Cancosa Strata formation was deposited. Farther west, away from Sillajhuay, drainages conversely descend to the Pampa del Tamarugal.

== Geology ==
The Nazca Plate and Antarctic Plate subduct beneath the South America Plate in the Peru-Chile Trench at a pace of 7–9 centimetres per year (2.8–3.5 in/year) and 2 centimetres per year (0.79 in/year), respectively, resulting in volcanic activity and geothermal manifestations in the Andes. Present-day volcanism occurs within four discrete belts: the NVZ (between 2°N–5°S), the CVZ (16°S–28°S), the SVZ (33°S–46°S) and the Austral Volcanic Zone (AVZ) (49°S-55°S). Between them they contain about 60 active volcanoes and 118 volcanoes which appear to have been active during the Holocene, not including potentially active very large silicic volcanic systems or very small monogenetic ones. These belts of active volcanism occur where the Nazca Plate subducts beneath the South America Plate at a steep angle, while in the volcanically inactive gaps between them the subduction is much shallower; thus there is no asthenosphere between the slab of the subducting plate and the overriding plate in the gaps.

Among the oldest volcanics in the region are Eocene effusive andesitic volcanics known as the Icanche Formation and associated subvolcanic bodies, such as the Alantaya intrusive complex. These also include granodioritic to tonalitic plutons. During the Eocene-Oligocene Incaic deformation phase this basement was uplifted and eroded and subsequently covered by rhyolitic ignimbrites called the Utayane Formation. Along with the Utayane, andesitic volcanism led to the emplacement of additional andesitic lava formations such as the Puchuldiza and Chojña Chaya Formations. Rhyolitic ignimbritic volcanism however continued and was accompanied during the Miocene by the uplift of mountain ranges. Eventually large central volcanoes developed during the Miocene and Pliocene and are mostly uneroded and not affected by tectonic deformation. Sillajhuay developed during this time period. Finally, the mountains were altered by at least two cycles of glaciation.

=== Local ===
The regional geography is characterized by north–south trending mountain chains which are separated by relatively flat plains covered by Quaternary sediments. Sillajhuay lies on top of older ignimbrites, which in turn were emplaced on top of granitic, sedimentary and volcanic rocks of Paleozoic to Mesozoic age. Some of these ignimbrites have been identified as the 19.38 million years old Oxaya Ignimbrite, the much younger Ujina Tsu ignimbrite and finally the Pastillos Ignimbrite.

Tectonic stress during the subduction process has led to the development of a horst that Sillajhuay is part of, perpendicular to the main strike of the Andes where magma formation was increased. The mountain is also part of the Serranía Intersalar mountain chain which separates the Salar de Coipasa from the Salar de Uyuni and lacks recent volcanic activity. Another isolated volcano Cerro Cariquima rises north of Sillajhuay, the volcanic centres of Churullo northwest and the volcanic chain Pumiri northeast of Sillajhuay form the rest of the neighbouring centres.

The volcano is formed by dacite and porphyry, including sulfur-containing porphyry which has a yellow colour and solfataric deposits; the volcanic rocks define a potassium-rich calc alkaline suite. Phenocrysts include plagioclase, with less common biotite, hornblende and quartz. Isotope ratios of volcanic rocks indicate a strong crustal influence on the magmas that were erupted at Sillajhuay.

== Climate and vegetation ==
The mountain lies in an arid region and features a montane climate; estimated precipitation rises from 200 millimetres per year (7.9 in/year) at 4,500 metres (14,800 ft) to 300–400 millimetres per year (12–16 in/year) at 5,000 metres (16,000 ft) elevation mostly during summer, although rainfall might exceed 400 millimetres per year (16 in/year). During the night the temperatures can fall to under −20 °C (−4 °F). Grasses and shrubs with rare trees form the vegetation, mostly on the eastern flank, and reach elevations exceeding 5,200 metres (17,100 ft). Among the plant species that grow in the area are yareta plants.

The dry climate is caused by the South East Pacific High and compounded by the Humboldt Current off the coast, which cools the atmosphere and reduces evaporation. Only during the summer months does convection on the Bolivian Altiplano lead to the arrival of moisture, leading to a predominant summer precipitation. The climate becomes even drier farther south. Cut-off lows can sometimes reach Sillajhuay in winter but are uncommon. In the past, such as 28,000, 8,000 and 3,700 - 1,500 years ago the climate was more humid and this led frequently to glacier advances when it was also cold enough. In return, glaciers on Sillajhuay may have enhanced the moisture supply to other mountains in the area such as Chuquiananta, allowing them to develop glaciers as well.

The strong insolation leads to a strongly diurnal temperature cycle on the mountain with a day-night temperature gradient of about 45 K (81 °F) that in some environments can increase to over 80 K (140 °F); there are thus active freeze-thaw cycles. The warming also leads to the development of mountain breeze and valley breeze, convective clouds as well as occasional landspouts.

== Human activity ==
The summit of Sillajhuay can be climbed and features Inca ruins on the summit; there are a number of such high altitude ruins in the Andes such as at Llullaillaco. This site was discovered in 2013 by the Scottish mountaineer John Biggar. Mining takes place east of Sillajhuay, including sulfur mines; estimated deposits are 3,200,000 tonnes (3,100,000 long tons; 3,500,000 short tons) of ore with 47% sulfur. The area has also been prospected for the possibility of obtaining geothermal power.The first recorded climb was by Friedrich Adolf Ernest Ahlfeld (Germany) in 1926.

== Eruptive history ==
The whole volcano is considered to be of Pliocene-Pleistocene age, although the lack of detailed study precludes a precise dating of volcanic activity. The strong glacial modification implies that volcanism at Sillajhuay took place during the older Pleistocene. The maximum age of 730,000 ± 160,000 years is set by the age of the underlying ignimbrites although dates obtained directly on the volcanic rocks from Sillajhuay imply ages of as much as 2.47 ± 0.06 million years ago. Most volcanic activity probably took place around 600,000 - 400,000 years ago with potassium-argon dating yielding an age of 890,000 ± 500,000 years ago. Very young activity may have formed some gravel plains in the river valleys, when the heat from the eruption melted the permafrost of the summit region.

However, between 2007 and 2010 a ground uplift of about 6 centimetres (2.4 in) was observed as Sillajhuay over an area 30 kilometres (19 mi) wide. In addition seismic activity was recorded at the volcano, and hot springs can be observed close to Sillajhuay, including the Pampa Lirima field 25 kilometres (16 mi) southwest of Sillajhuay. These patterns indicate that magma may still exist below the volcano and that it should be classified as a potentially active volcano.

== See also ==
- List of mountains in Chile
- List of Andean peaks with known pre-Columbian ascents
