= Linzor =

Mountain in Chile

Volcán Linzor
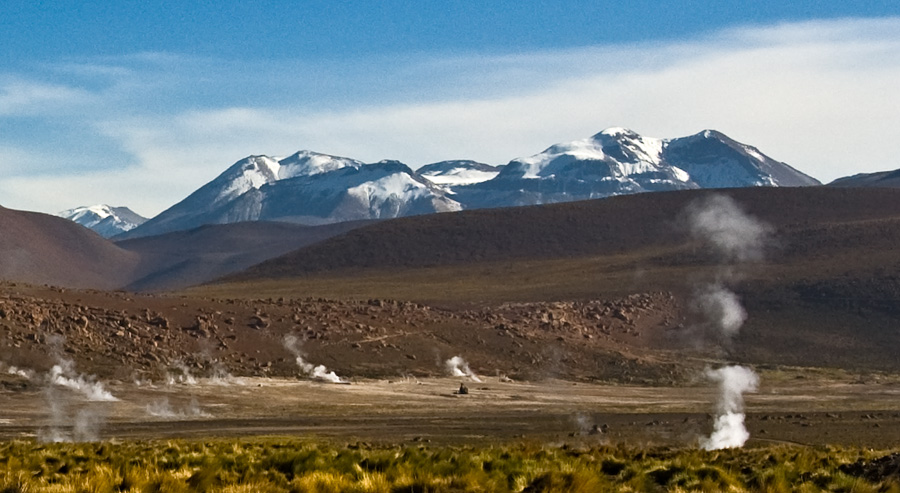
- Volcán Linzor seen from the south at the El Tatio geo-thermal field. In the background the summit of the El Apagado Norte volcano.

Highest point
- Elevation: 5,680 m (18,640 ft)
- Coordinates: 22°09′S 67°58′W

Geography
- Location: Bolivia and Chile
- Parent range: Andes

Geology
- Mountain type: Stratovolcano

Volcán Linzor is a stratovolcano on the border between Bolivia and Chile. In its vicinity lie Laguna Colorada and Cerro del León.

== Geology ==
=== Regional ===
Since the late Oligocene, subduction of the Nazca Plate beneath the South America Plate has caused volcanism on the western edge of South America, including the formation of the Central Volcanic Zone. The crust in the Central Andes contains both an upper felsic layer and a lower mafic layer and was partly assembled from numerous terranes during the Mesoproterozoic. The most important two form the Arequipa-Antofalla crustal domain.

=== Local ===
Linzor volcano is part of the Central Volcanic Zone. The Andean Central Volcanic Zone has erupted large ignimbrites and lava flows. Dominant rocks are andesite and dacite. One part of the Central Volcanic Zone is the Altiplano-Puna volcanic complex, a system of ignimbrite sheets and lava domes that was active between 8.4 and 2.9 million years ago and is underpinned by a layer of partially molten crust. In the Linzor area, volcanism is represented by the 8.3 million years old Sifon ignimbrite, Cerro Chillahuita and Cerro Chao.

Linzor and other volcanoes in the neighbourhood are constructed by breccia, lava domes, lava flows, pyroclastic flows and breccia. The volcanoes are formed by basaltic andesite, andesite and dacite. Pyroxene andesite is the dominant component. The volcanoes are constructed on top of Miocene ignimbrites and are of Pleistocene-Holocene age. An Inca sanctuary has been found on Linzor.

Linzor is part of a north-south trending volcanic chain with San Pedro volcano which was heavily glaciated in the past. This chain is parallel to several Paleozoic faults in the region. The Rio Toconce, a tributary of the Rio Salado and ultimately of the Loa River, originates at the foot of Linzor.

== See also ==
- List of volcanoes in Chile
- List of volcanoes in Bolivia
