= Cerro del León =

Mountain in Chile

- Puma Orko (Male puma)
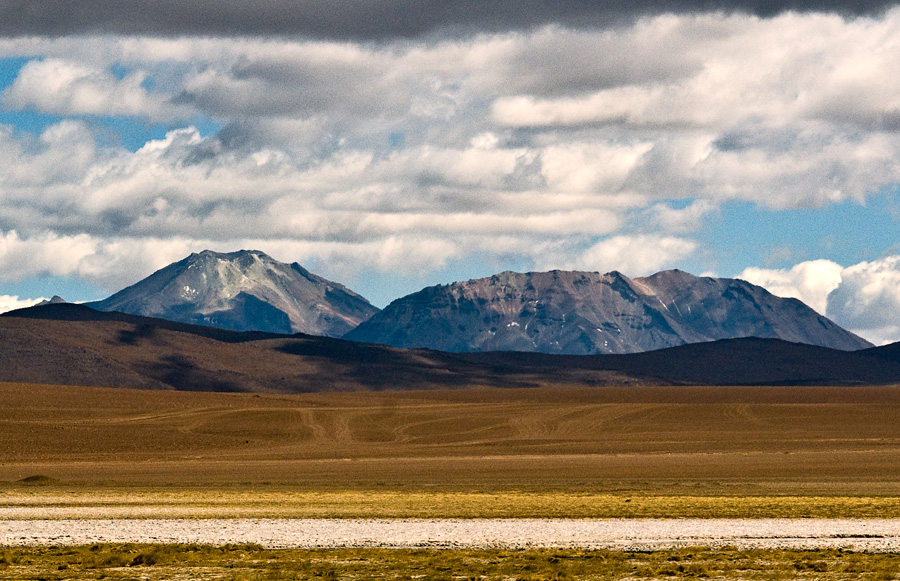
- The Cerro del León (left) and Cerro Toconce seen from the "Vado de Putana" wetlands.

Highest point
- Elevation: 5,760 m (18,900 ft)
- Coordinates: 22°08′21″S 68°06′39″W

Geography
- Location: Antofagasta, Chile
- Parent range: Andes

Geology
- Mountain type: Stratovolcano
- Last eruption: Unknown

Cerro del León is a stratovolcano located in El Loa province, Antofagasta Region, Chile. It is part of the Chilean Central Volcanic Zone and forms a volcanic lineament with neighbouring Paniri and Toconce that was active into the Holocene. Cerro del León itself was constructed in three stages by andesitic–dacitic lava flows and was subject to glacial erosion.

== Geology ==
The volcano has a diameter of 6 kilometres (3.7 mi) and is constructed from andesites erupted through three stages of activity. Two nested craters lie on its summit and have diameters of 260–270 metres (850–890 ft). Volcán Lagunita is a neighbouring volcano and is more heavily eroded and hydrothermally altered.

=== Regional setting ===
Cerro del León is part of the Central Volcanic Zone, a volcanic belt in the Andes. Volcanic activity occurs since the Oligocene and includes dacitic–rhyolitic ignimbrites. On top of these the main volcanic arc, including andesitic-dacitic stratovolcanoes, has formed 300–350 kilometres (190–220 mi) away from the Peru–Chile Trench on a crust 120 kilometres (75 mi) thick. San Pedro and Lascar have historical activity, but only a few volcanoes have been studied, namely Lascar, Ollagüe and Parinacota.

The volcano is part of the San Pedro-Linzor lineament, a 65 kilometres (40 mi) long volcanic chain that extends northwest-southeastward. It was constructed on top the Toconce and Sifon Ignimbrites. The alignment was active during the late Pleistocene–Holocene and contains San Pedro-San Pablo–Paniri–Cerro del León–Toconce–Linzor.

=== Eruption history ===
The volcano was constructed in various phases. The base of the volcano is constructed from andesitic lava flows that directly overlie the ignimbrite basement. These at first erupted in the west and east, subsequently northwest and southeast. Dacites and andesites form the last stage and the bulk of the edifice.

The volcano was subject to glaciation, leaving moraines down to 5,200 metres (17,100 ft) altitude, formed during the last glaciation 15,000–11,000 years ago. Glacial effects are noticeable on the north-northwest flanks.

=== Petrology ===
Lavas contain phenocrysts of plagioclase with variable amounts of biotite, clinopyroxene, opaque minerals, and orthopyroxene. The matrix is glassy and contains hornblende and plagioclase. The lavas have vesicular and minor proportions of amygdaloid, porphyric, trachytic and vitrophyric texture. Hydrothermal alteration has been reported.

== Religious importance ==
Cerro del Leon is a holy mountain for the local territory. An Inca religious site is located on its summit.

== See also ==
- Cerro Chao
- List of volcanoes in Chile
- Cerro Paniri has a recent satellite photo of the region.
