= John Biggar (mountaineer) =

Scottish mountaineer, guide and explorer

- Born: 1964 (age 61–62); St. Bees, United Kingdom
- Education: University of Edinburgh
- Occupation: Mountaineer

John Biggar (born 1964) is a Scottish mountaineer, high altitude mountain guide and explorer, mainly active in the Andes. From 1995 to the present day he has made a number of first ascents in the Andes. He discovered the Inca ruins on the summit of Alto Toroni, a 5995m high peak on the frontier between Chile and Bolivia and was first to realise that a small lake on Ojos del Salado was the world's highest lake. As of 2020, Biggar has climbed 54 major and 17 less prominent peaks of over 6000 m in the Andes, the second highest total of anyone, after Maximo Kausch.

== Andean 6000m peak list ==
Biggar was the first to compile a regularised and comprehensive list of the 6000 m high peaks of the Andes, using a fixed prominence cut-off. His list, first published in November 1996, was compiled using IGM mapping. Originally there were 99 peaks on the list. Subsequent revisions using satellite topography data such as that provided by the Shuttle Radar Topography Mission, have resulted in a list of 100 peaks in the 4th edition.

== First ascents ==
Biggar has made first ascents in the Andes of six 6000m+ peaks and ten 5000 m+ peaks. These ascents have been in several different ranges, including a 2005 expedition to the Cordillera Carabaya of Peru, a January 2010 ascent of Medusa Northeast and a November 2011 expedition to the Cordon de los Pioneros in Argentina.

== Other ascents ==
Climbing Mercedario in January 2004, John Biggar became the first person to climb all of the ten highest peaks in the Andes, based on the most commonly accepted lists and prominence criteria. Just a few months later in July 2004 es:Dario Bracali completed the top ten according to the same 6000m peak list with an ascent of Huascaran Norte. He had earlier completed the ten highest peaks in the Andes according to a different list which omits Huascaran Norte. In February 2007 with an ascent of Incahuasi John Biggar became the second person to have climbed the worlds ten highest volcanoes, after Michel Siegenthaler first achieved this feat in 2005. In December 2015 Biggar organised an international expedition that was the first for over 20 years to climb Pico Cristobal Colon, the highest peak in Colombia.
