= Cerro Porquesa =

Rhyodacite lava dome in the Andes

Coordinates: 19°59′S 68°46′W

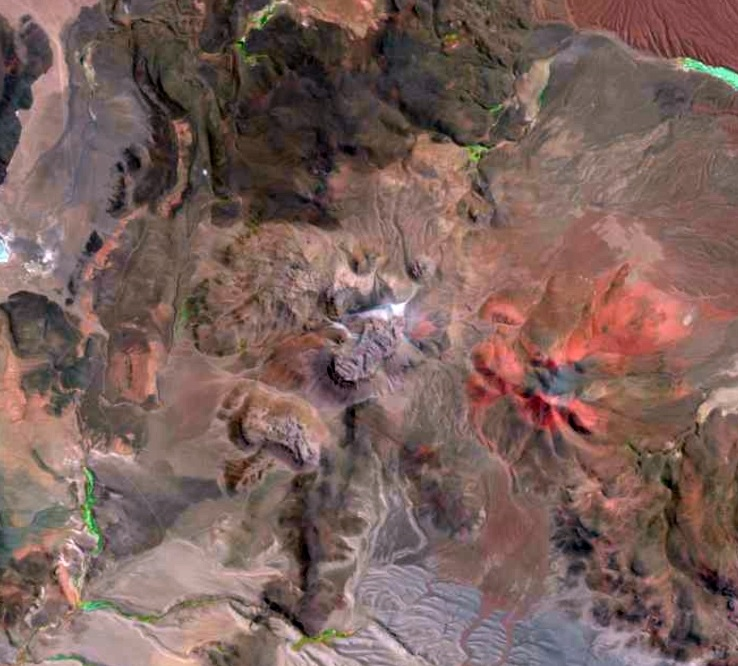
False colour satellite image of the Cerro Porquesa lava domes (grey-violet) in the centre.

Cerro Porquesa (Aymara) is an approximately 4,600 metres (15,100 ft) high (800 metres (2,600 ft) above base) rhyodacite lava dome in the Andes. It has a 1.5 by 3 kilometres (0.93 mi × 1.86 mi) oval outline, and is 800 metres (2,600 ft) high. The lava dome is accompanied by block-and-ash flows and lava flows and the presence of two volcanic cones has been reported. The lava dome is of Pliocene/Pleistocene age with little glacial features on the younger domes indicating young ages. The Quebrada de Piga, which flows to Salar del Huasco, originates at Cerro Porquesa.

The dome was formed in at least three different eruption stages, with each stage contributing about two or three different lobes. Further, a rhyolitic ignimbrite with 69.5% SiO_{2} may be linked to the domes. It fills a valley in the south of the complex about 2 metres (6 ft 7 in) thick. This ignimbrite is dated 0.73±0.16 and 0.63 +0.92/-0.63 mya by potassium-argon dating in biotite, although with low precision. Another 0.28 mya old ignimbrite was originally attributed to Porquesa but instead comes from a 4 kilometres (2.5 mi) wide caldera in Bolivia. Three dates have been obtained from the domes, 0.63±0.63 mya, less than 1 mya and 1.1±0.4 mya. The volcanic complex was probably active after 280,000 years ago but not in the Holocene. Some of the ignimbrites have been offset by faults.

This lava dome is located 20° in a volcanic gap named Pica gap. In this gap volcanic activity younger than 2 mya isn't found and where lead (Pb) isotope ratios in rocks change with the radiogenicity of the isotope ratio decreasing northward. Porquesa has intermediary isotope ratios. The lower ratio was principally imparted by the low-radiogenic Pb upper crust. Samples and the appearance of the domes in aerial photographs indicate a homogeneous composition with about 68% SiO_{2}. Their main component is dacite, with biotite, hornblende and plagioclase phenocrysts.
