= Cerro Lirima =

Mountain in the Atacama Region, Chile

Coordinates: 19°46′S 68°52′W

Cerro Lirima is a mountain in the Andes of Chile. It has a height of 5552 metres.

== Human Activity ==
The main access to the mountain is from the town of Lirima, where permission must be obtained from the local community to enter via a road that allows access to the mountain.

== See also ==
- List of mountains in the Andes
