= Cariquima =

Town in Chile

Coordinates: 19°28′05″S 68°38′39″W

- Town
- Cariquima
- Coat of arms
- Interactive map of Cariquima
- Country: Chile
- Region: Tarapacá Region
- Province: El Tamarugal
- Area code: (+56) 5

Cariquima is a highland town in Chile. The town is a few kilometers south of Colchane, in the Tarapacá Region of Chile. It can be found on the slopes of Nevado Cariquima or Mama Huanapa. It is a central meeting point for Aymara indigenous communities. The town has a clinic, a school, electricity (during the afternoons) and an airport which was built by the Chilean Air Force in 2003.

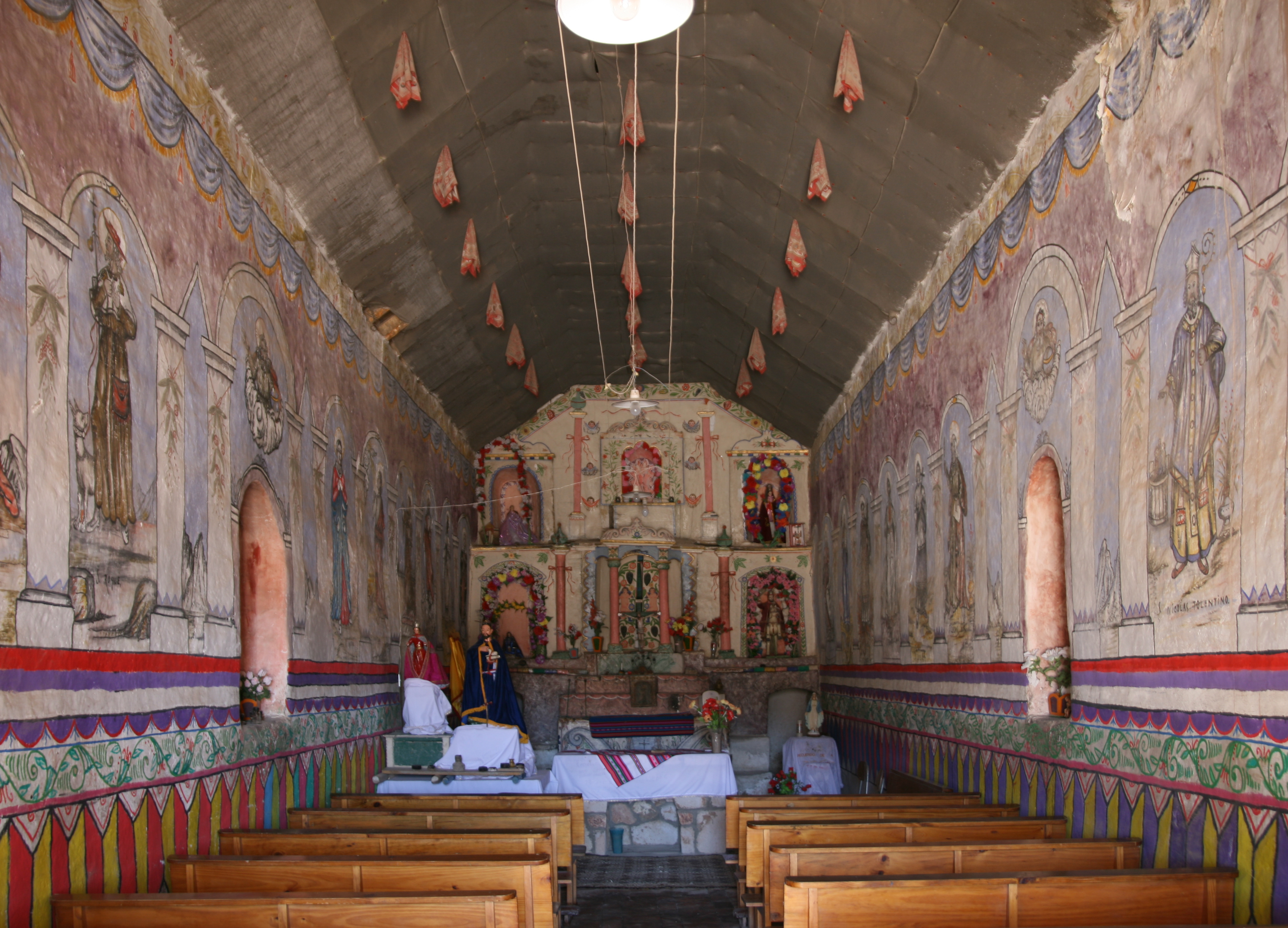
Oldest Architectural building in Cariquima

The church in Cariquima is the oldest architectural building in the town since 2006 which also serves as a historical monument. Cariquima also has a nearby river.

== History ==
The origin of "Cariquima" has not yet been determined. On November 24, San Juan, the town's Chief Patron, is celebrated. In addition to the Catholic religion introduced in colonial times, in Cariquima almost 50% of the population are also Pentecostal.

== Nearby towns ==
- Ancovinto
- Ancuaque
- Chijo
- Chulluncane
- Huaytane
- Panavinto
- Quebe
- Villablanca
