= Cerro Chao =

Lava flow complex of Andes volcano Cerro del León

- Chao Dacite
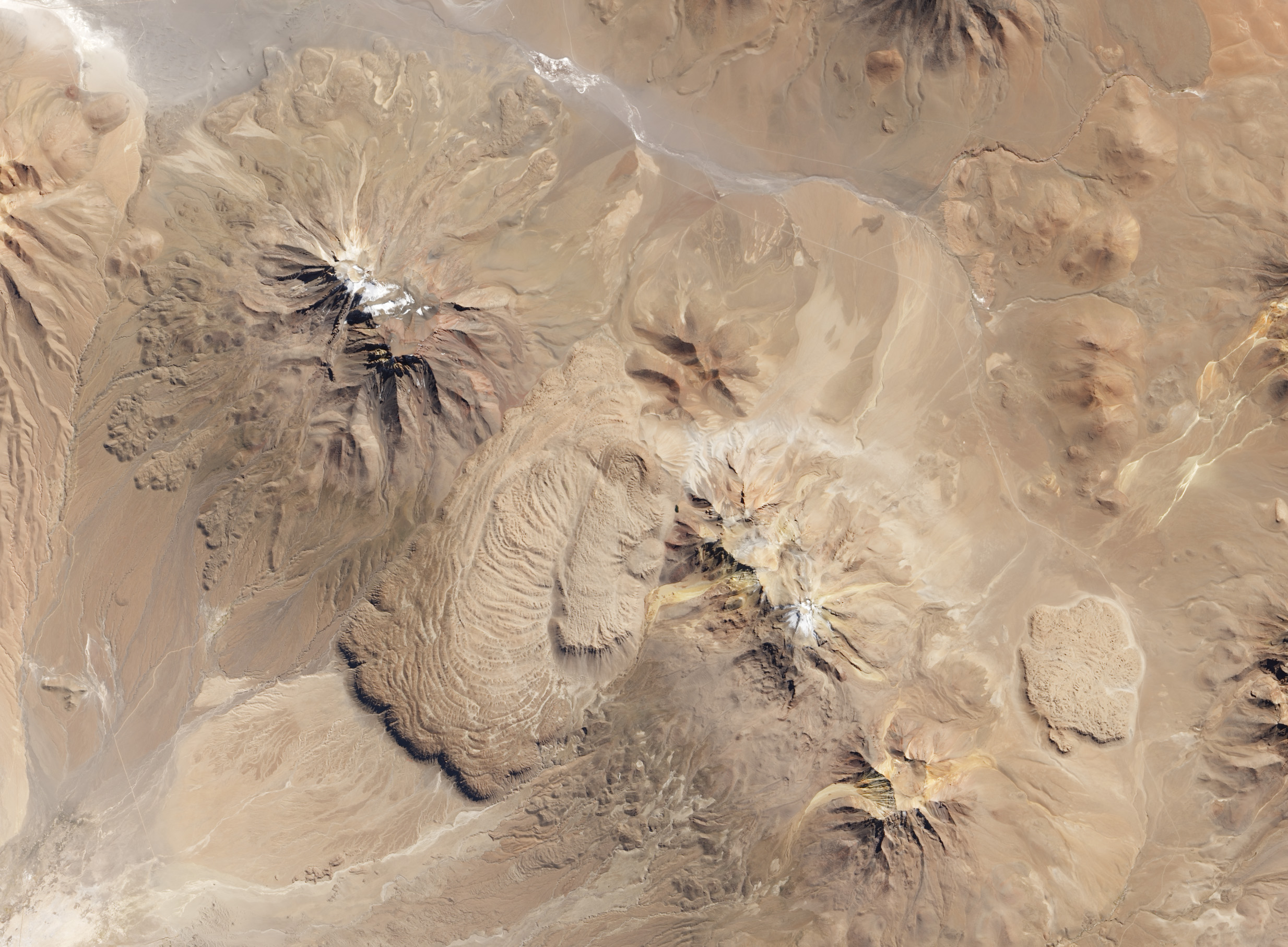
- The lava flows from space

Highest point
- Coordinates: 22°07′S 68°09′W

Geography
- Location within Chile

Geology
- Rock age: 423,000 - 11,000 years ago.

Cerro Chao is a lava flow complex associated with the Cerro del León volcano in the Andes. It is the largest known Quaternary silicic volcano body and part of the most recent phase of activity in the Altiplano–Puna volcanic complex.

Cerro Chao formed over the course of three eruptions preceded by a pyroclastic stage. Three large lobate lava flows erupted in the col between two volcanoes and advanced for a maximum length of 14 kilometres (8.7 mi). The eruption that originated the lava flows probably lasted more than one hundred years and occurred before the Holocene.

== Geology ==
Cerro Chao, also named Cerros de Chao, Chao lava, Chao volcano, or Chao dacite is located in the volcanic front of the Central Volcanic Zone of the Andes, between the older Paniri and Cerro del León andesitic stratovolcanoes. The Central Volcanic Zone is one of the three volcanic belts in the Andes. Chao is also known as Echao.

The region is dominated by the Altiplano–Puna volcanic complex, where about 15,000 cubic kilometres (3,600 cu mi) of ignimbrites were emplaced during the past 25 million years. Flare-ups took place 11, 8.4, 5.5, 4 and 2.5 million years ago, with a minor flare-up 1 million years ago; volcanism is currently in a low-output phase where lava domes and stratovolcanoes of andesitic composition are being emplaced. Activity is controlled by fault zones, some of these linked to the Pastos Grandes caldera. Neighbouring volcanoes with similar characteristics to Cerro Chao include Cerro Chanca/Pabellon, Cerro Chascon–Runtu Jarita complex, Cerro Chillahuita and La Torta. Cerro Chao lies within a northwest-running belt of volcanoes known as the San Pedro-Linzor volcanic chain, some of them over 6,000 metres (20,000 ft) high, of which San Pedro has historical activity. Cerro Chao is the largest such silicic lava flow known.

The eruption is intriguing both in terms of the viscosity of the erupted lavas and its effusive nature. Conventional lava flows increase in viscosity with increasing crystal content; however Chao lava flows were erupted with similar viscosities and yield strengths as silicic domes. The formation of a lava flow instead of a lava dome may have been influenced by the formation of a carapace on the flow and the steep slopes the flows initially formed on; the late Chao III flow formed on the very gentle slope left by the previous Chao I and Chao II flows and shows some lava dome characteristics.

=== Origins ===
The andesite inclusions contained in the lava are characteristic for magma mixing processes. The eruption forming the flow may have been caused by the injection of andesite in a pre-existent homogenous dacitic magma chamber. The injection did presumably modify the crystallization processes in the magma chamber and the volatiles in the magma to the point of forcing an eruption.

The Altiplano-Puna volcanic complex is underpinned by the Altiplano-Puna Magmatic Body, where magma differentiation processes take place. Magmas from the APMB combine with shallower melts to produce the Chao lavas. They may either be the remnants of a previous magma body that gave rise to the neighbouring calderas of the Altiplano-Puna volcanic complex, or may be the sign of a new injection of magmas in the crust. The significance of these theories is controversial.

=== Structure ===
Cerro Chao is a 14 kilometres (8.7 mi)-long coulee. It has a volume of 26 cubic kilometres (6.2 cu mi) and its flow front is 400 metres (1,300 ft) high. Based on volumetric considerations, the eruption lasted about 100-150 years with an average lava flux rate of 25 cubic metres per second (880 cu ft/s). The volume of Chao is exceptional for a lava dome structure, although the lava flux rate generating it is low in comparison to a basaltic eruption like Laki in Iceland. This low flux rate is insufficient to cause caldera formation. Cerro Chao is the largest Quaternary silicic lava flow in the world. The vent location is related to an inferred fault zone emanating from one of the neighbouring volcanoes and the flow expanded over flat terrain.

The flow is underpinned by a pyroclastic apron that extends 3 by 4 kilometres (1.9 mi × 2.5 mi) from the flow front. Most of it is buried beneath the flow and only on the eastern side does some material emerge; its volume is estimated at 1 cubic kilometre (0.24 cu mi). This deposit is formed from several layers of pumices separated by erosion surfaces; at least one layer may be derived from Paniri volcano. Despite its location between two older volcanoes, Cerro Chao appears to have an independent magmatic system.

An overlapping pair of pyroclastic cones sits on top of the Chao flow and form its eruption vent. The cone has a dense rock equivalent volume of 0.5 cubic kilometres (0.12 cu mi) of lapilli and blocks. The northern side of the cone rises 100 metres (330 ft) from terrain while the southern side is partially breached. The highest point of the cone lies at 5,169 metres (16,959 ft) altitude. Its morphology suggests that it formed from a lava dome when it collapsed over the vent.

The eruption of Cerro Chao occurred in several phases. In a first phase, Plinian–Vulcanian activity generated pyroclastic flow deposits to the south of the system. Most of the pyroclastics were formed during this phase, although some minor deposits formed from the collapse of the forming flow. A thin lapilli layer has been linked to San Pedro volcano. Explosive activity continued during the extrusion of the Chao flow, growing the pumice cone.

The flow proper is subdivided in three subunits, the first two named Chao I and Chao II. Originally subdivided because of their morphology, they most likely represent various pulses of the same eruption. They have a combined volume exceeding 22 cubic kilometres (5.3 cu mi) and are formed from a long southbound flow with some lateral spillage. The flow itself is 14 kilometres (8.7 mi) long and its flow front is 400 metres (1,300 ft) high. Its structure is massive and lobate, with lobe diameters expanding downflow from 0.5 to 1.8 kilometres (0.31 to 1.12 mi). The flows are covered by ogives (up to 30 metres (98 ft) high and with spacing of 50 by 100 metres (160 ft × 330 ft)) and some structures interpreted as fossil fumaroles. The ridges are drawn out on the western flow margin. The folds in the surface layers may have been caused by the surface stiffening more quickly than the underlying flow due to cooling. The flow surface is blocky, with blocks occasionally displaying flow banding. The lowest Chao I flow covers an area of 52 square kilometres (20 sq mi).

The Chao III flow has a smaller volume of 2 cubic kilometres (0.48 cu mi) than Chao I and II. It has less ogives than Chao I and II and forms a single lobe, 150 metres (490 ft) high. The flow overlies the pumice cone and parts of the Chao II on its eastern side. A lava dome formed above its vent and underwent several collapses, generating collapse scars. The flow is covered by weathering-derived aeolian debris from the other flows. This flow has a surface area of 13 square kilometres (5.0 sq mi).

=== Petrology ===
The Chao flow is of dacitic composition, with some non-vesicular small andesitic inclusions that are more numerous in the Chao III and upper Chao II stages, up to 5% of the volume of some Chao III lavas and vesiculated there. The lava has a porphyric texture owing to its high crystal content of 45% and displays extensive flow banding. Chao III lavas have lower concentrations of crystals. Phenocrysts in the lava contain biotite, hornblende, plagioclase and quartz. Some hornblende crystals have diameters of up to 2 centimetres (0.79 in). Apatite and zircon are accessory minerals. Based on geochemical considerations, the magmas equilibrated at depths of 7–8 kilometres (4.3–5.0 mi) and temperatures of 840 °C (1,540 °F). The rocks of Cerro Chao define a potassium-rich calc-alkaline suite. It shares numerous traits with the rocks of other lava domes in the region.

=== Geologic history ===
Uranium-thorium dating, potassium–argon dating and argon–argon dating performed on rocks from Cerro Chao have indicated an average age of 423,000 ± 100,000 years for Chao I, while ages of 111,200 ± 7,500 years ago and 79,100 years ago are not assigned to a particular unit. However, anomalous chemical compositions of the dated rocks suggest that they may overestimate the true age of the volcanics. Such alteration may be the result of the inclusion of xenocrysts or K leaching. A glacial moraine system lies on Cerro del León at 4,500 metres (14,800 ft) altitude. One of these moraines abuts Cerro Chao, indicating that the dome must be older than the moraine and thus older than the last glaciation 11,000 years ago. An active magmatic body may still exist under Cerro Chao and Paniri.

== See also ==
- Altiplano–Puna volcanic complex
- Cerro Chascon-Runtu Jarita complex
- List of lava domes
- Paniri
