= Cerro Cariquima =

Volcano in the Andes

Coordinates: 19.55°S 68.68°W

Cariquima
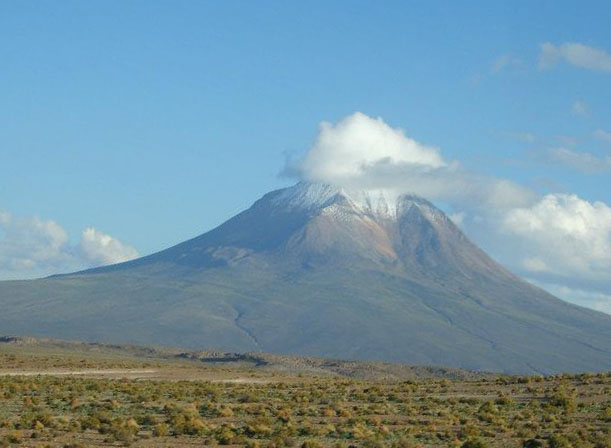

Geography

Cerro Cariquima is a 5,365 metres (17,602 ft) high volcano in the Andes. It is a sacred mountain of the territory, featuring a mountain sanctuary.

The edifice presently has a volume of 36 cubic kilometres (8.6 cu mi) and based on erosion an age of 4.6 million years has been inferred. The true age of the volcano is unclear; it has a youthful appearance and a cone on the northeast flank was recorded as being active in the last 2000 years, but the appearance of the volcano is similar to other Pliocene volcanoes and no evidence of young volcanism is visible. Cariquima is located within the Pica gap which lacks young volcanism.
