= Cupo =

Cupo is a surname. Notable people with the surname include:

- Antonio Cupo, Canadian film and television actor
- Armando Cupo, Argentine musician
