= Lirima =

Town in Chile

- Town
- Lirima
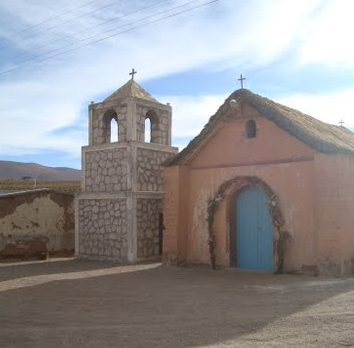

- Coordinates: 19°50′53″S 68°51′18″O
- Country: Chile
- Region: Tarapacá Region
- Province: El Tamarugal

Lirima (in Aymara: lirima, 'where the fox drinks water') is a Chilean town. It is a town that is located approximately 138 km east of Huara, in the Tarapacá Region, Chile. It is located in the Commune of Pica. It is a town founded by a group of Aymara families. It is famous for its spun wool fabrics dyed with the traditional processes of the inhabitants themselves. It is located in Pampa Columtucsa, at the foot of Cerro Lirima and several kilometers from Laguna Quantija and Apacheta de Irpa or Cancosa Border Crossing.
