= Cancosa =

Commune in Chile

Coordinates: 19°51′20″S 68°36′06″W

- Town
- Cancosa
- Coat of arms

- Country: Chile
- Region: Tarapacá Region
- Province: El Tamarugal

Cancosa is a village situated in the Tarapacá Region of Chile, known for its Aymara heritage. It is located near the border with Bolivia, at the base of the Sillajhuay volcano. According to historical records from the Registrar of Real Estate of the municipality of Iquique (currently stored in the national archive), the town is believed to have been established by the Moscoso, Challapa, Ticuna, and Mamani families.

The village encompasses several essential facilities, including a school, library, neighborhood council, tourist shelter, sports club, and a Chilean Carabineros outpost. The local economy relies on various sources of income, such as quinoa agriculture, llama and alpaca farming, as well as tourism and crafts. Additionally, there are four minefields in the area, which were supposed to be cleared by the Chilean government in accordance with the Ottawa Treaty before the year 2020.
