= San Pedro (Chile volcano) =

One of the tallest active volcanoes in the world

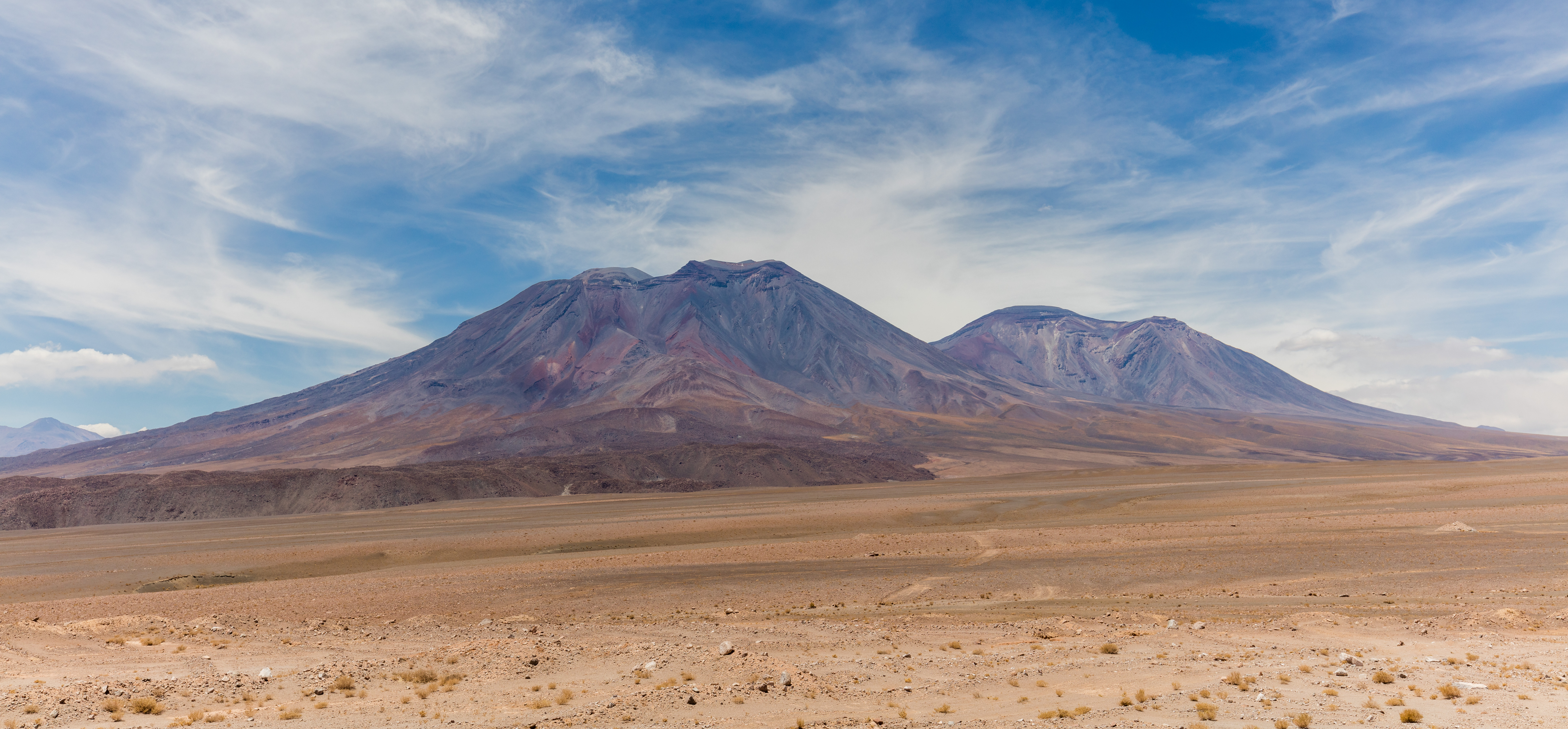
- San Pedro with San Pablo volcano immediately right

Highest point
- Elevation: 6,155 m (20,194 ft)
- Prominence: 2,034 m (6,673 ft)
- Parent peak: Ojos del Salado
- Listing: Ultra
- Coordinates: 21°53′16″S 68°23′29″W

Geography
- Location within Chile
- Location: Chile
- Parent range: Andes

Geology
- Mountain type: Stratovolcano
- Last eruption: 1960

Climbing
- First ascent: 16 July 1903; 123 years ago George Courty & Filemón Morales

San Pedro is a Holocene volcano in northern Chile. A composite volcano, at 6,155 metres (20,194 ft) in elevation it is one of the highest active volcanoes in the world. It is part of the Central Volcanic Zone of the Andes, one of the four tracts of the Andean Volcanic Belt. This region of volcanism includes the world's two highest volcanoes Ojos del Salado and Llullaillaco. San Pedro, like other Andean volcanoes, was formed by the subduction of the Nazca Plate beneath the South America Plate. It has a neighbouring volcano, San Pablo, and is itself formed by two separate edifices usually known as the Old Cone and the Young Cone. These edifices are formed by rocks ranging from basaltic andesite over andesite to dacite and are emplaced on a basement formed by Miocene volcanic rocks.

The Old Cone was active over one hundred thousand years ago and was eventually truncated by a giant landslide that removed its northwestern side. Within the landslide scar lava flows and pyroclastic flows constructed the Young Cone as well as the lateral centre La Poruña. This volcano was glaciated during the Pleistocene and a large Plinian eruption occurred at the beginning of the Holocene. Some eruptions reportedly occurred during historical time; presently the volcano is fumarolically active.

== Geography and geomorphology ==
San Pedro is located in northern Chile, in the Ollagüe commune, El Loa Province, Antofagasta Region; the border to Bolivia is 35 kilometres (22 mi) away. The whole region is remote and thinly populated; towns in the area include Ascotán, Cupo, Inacaliri and Paniri; and the San Pedro railway station lies southwest of the volcano. Tracks left by sulfur miners lead up to San Pedro's summit, and roads run around the volcano; Chile Route 21 passes around the northern, northwestern and western flanks of the volcano.

San Pedro is part of the 600 kilometres (370 mi) long Central Volcanic Zone, one of the two belts of volcanoes in Chile, which contains a total of about 44 active volcanoes plus silicic caldera and ignimbrite systems and monogenetic volcanoes. Many of these volcanoes are of Pliocene to Pleistocene age and approach heights of about 7,000 metres (23,000 ft) above sea level at Llullaillaco and Ojos del Salado; such sizes of the volcanoes occur because the edifices rise from a relatively high basement. Volcanism in this region is relatively poorly studied and there is not much present-day activity; with the exception of Láscar, most present-day manifestations are limited to fumarolic activity.

San Pedro is one of the highest volcanoes in the world and is visible as far as 85 kilometres (53 mi) away in Calama. Its height has been variously given as 6,145 metres (20,161 ft), 6,142 metres (20,151 ft) or 6,163 metres (20,220 ft). It is a composite volcano, which forms a twin volcano with San Pablo 6 kilometres (3.7 mi) farther east. Between the two lies the so-called "Central Crater" at an elevation of 5,250 metres (17,220 ft). San Pedro itself is formed from the easterly "Old Cone" whose most prominent expression is the eastern summit, and the westerly "Young Cone" which is only about 100 metres (330 ft) lower. The "Young Cone" has two craters, the eastern of which is the younger one. Lava flows emerge from a breach in this crater and have filled an older 1.2 kilometres (0.75 mi) wide older crater. Hydrothermally altered rocks and sulfur deposits are found on San Pedro's summit and were mined into the 1930s.

A number of lava flows of volumes between 0.1–1.7 cubic kilometres (0.024–0.408 cu mi) make up part of the edifice. The upper part of the Younger Cone is covered with such lava flows, which have steep fronts and are up to 100 metres (330 ft) thick. Downslope the lava flows are found mainly over the northwestern flank where they radiate away from San Pedro's crater. The total volume of the volcano is estimated to be 56 cubic kilometres (13 cu mi).

Scars at elevations of 5,500 metres (18,000 ft) on the edifice have been the origin of mudflows; the largest is known as Estación flow and covers much of the southern and western foot of San Pedro to distances of 30 kilometres (19 mi); the debris apron reaches the Loa River and San Pedro River. These mudflows occurred between 110,000 – 36,000 years ago and they filled the river bed of the Loa, while the impact on the San Pedro River was much more minor. Hot avalanche deposits or pyroclastic flows are also found on the volcano; the largest of which covers large parts of the edifice and has a total volume of approximately 1.5 cubic kilometres (0.36 cu mi). These deposits contain prismatic jointed blocks and poorly sorted pumice, with their thickness ranging from a thick layer to scattered rocks. Their formation was probably due to the steep incline of San Pedro's slopes which tended to destabilize lava bodies high on the edifice, similar to regular landslides. At least one Plinian fall deposit is known from San Pedro; the size of the deposit indicates that it was as large as the AD 79 eruption of Vesuvius in Italy. This Plinian eruption was accompanied by the formation of an ignimbrite that covers much of the southern, southwestern and western slopes of San Pedro and reaches thicknesses of 3 metres (9.8 ft). It has a volume of 2–15 cubic kilometres (0.48–3.60 cu mi) and is called the El Encanto ignimbrite.

There is evidence of a large sector collapse on San Pedro, which removed the northwestern flank of the volcano and formed a large debris avalanche deposit. This avalanche deposit covers a surface area of 120 square kilometres (46 sq mi) and its front is 35–40 metres (115–131 ft) high in the Pampa de la Avestruz. The debris flow formed by the sector collapse does not have many of the typical hummock-like hills of volcanic sector collapse deposits and instead features grooves and radial ridges. Such flank collapse occurred notably on Mount St. Helens during its eruption in 1980. A 250 metres (820 ft) high scarp west of the eastern summit was left by the collapse of San Pedro; otherwise much of the evidence was buried by later volcanic activity. As with the mudflows, the steep slopes of San Pedro probably facilitated the onset of the sector collapse, which descended over an elevation difference of about 2,845 metres (9,334 ft).

A parasitic vent named La Poruña lies on the western foot of San Pedro, so named after its form. Its formation was probably influenced by a normal fault that runs in that area. It is a 900 metres (3,000 ft) wide and 140 metres (460 ft) high scoria cone on top of a field of lava flows which extend as far as 10 kilometres (6.2 mi) west of San Pedro and 8 kilometres (5.0 mi) from the cone. The cone's western side slumped and lava flows emanate from that area, reaching a considerable distance from the cone. These flows are subdivided into a small proximal unit and two distant ones, and feature structures such as ogives and levees. In addition, a lava dome at an elevation of 5,000 metres (16,000 ft) lies on the southwestern flank of San Pedro and also seems to be a parasitic vent. Andesite lava flows emanate from this area as well. They are the largest found on San Pedro, with volumes of 3 cubic kilometres (0.72 cu mi) and a surface area of 19 square kilometres (7.3 sq mi); they reach a distance of c. 13 kilometres (8.1 mi) from the vent.

San Pedro has been glaciated in the past. Evidence of such glaciation is found especially on the southern side of the Old Cone and it includes moraines at elevations of over 4,400 metres (14,400 ft) as well as other glacially modified surfaces such as rock pavements and striated boulders. The chronology of glaciations in the Central Andes is poorly known but stratigraphic relations indicate that San Pedro was glaciated during the late Pleistocene. There are active rock glaciers on the mountain, with traces of past rock glaciers in cirques on the southern flank, but there are no glaciers presently on San Pedro. A perennial snow cover was reported in the 19th century.

The San Pedro River flows at the foot of San Pedro volcano, and joins the Loa River southwest of the volcano; Pleistocene lava flows from San Pedro created a lava dam on the San Pedro River, forming a lake which no longer exists. As reported in 1926, the slopes of San Pedro were used to cultivate llareta, a plant that was grown as a fuel source.

== Geology ==
Beneath northern Chile, the Nazca Plate subducts beneath the South America Plate. This subduction process is responsible for volcanic activity in the Western Cordillera, as well as elsewhere in the Andes.

The volcanoes of Chile are part of the Pacific Ring of Fire, which in Chile contains about 2000 volcanoes over a length of 4,500 kilometres (2,800 mi). In Chile, it is subdivided into two volcanic zones, the Central Volcanic Zone which also spans Peru, Bolivia and Argentina, and the Southern Volcanic Zone which spans Chile and Argentina. In addition, Colombia and Ecuador feature the Northern Volcanic Zone, while the subduction of the Antarctic Plate beneath the South America Plate at the southernmost tip of South America forms the Austral Volcanic Zone south of the Southern Volcanic Zone.

There were two cycles of volcanic activity in Chile, the first during the Permian-Triassic and a second starting from the Tertiary. In the San Pedro region, this volcanic activity migrated east from its point of inception but recently has moved back westward. West of San Pedro lies the Pampa del Tamarugal and the Coastal Cordillera, neither of which show evidence of recent volcanic activity.

=== Regional ===
Volcanoes in this region of Chile often form lineaments perpendicular to the volcanic arc, with northwest–southeast and north–south lineaments common. One such lineament is the c. 65 kilometres (40 mi) long San Pedro-Linzor lineament, which includes San Pedro, Paniri, Cerro Chao, Cerro del León, Toconce and Linzor. Other volcanoes with such trends are Carasilla-Polapi-Cerro Cebollar-Cerro Ascotan-Palpana and the Aucanquilcha complex; the youngest edifice is the westernmost one.

The basement of the region is formed by various metamorphic and sedimentary rocks intruded by plutons ranging in their age from the Paleozoic to the Tertiary; one of these is the 65 million years old Cerro Colorado pluton. However, in the area of San Pedro this basement is entirely buried beneath volcanites of Miocene age, including ignimbrites, remnants of composite volcanoes and volcanic debris. At least three individual ignimbrites have been found; one of the ignimbrites, the San Pedro Ignimbrite, may have originated from a vent now covered by San Pedro volcano although the neighbouring Caracanal volcano is also a candidate source. The crust in the region is about 70 kilometres (43 mi) thick. The older composite volcano centres include Cerro Carcanal and Cerro Huiche south-southeast of San Pedro and Cerro del Diablo due north. This surface slopes down to the Loa River in the west.

=== Composition ===
Old Cone lavas range from andesite to olivine-containing basaltic andesite. Young Cone lavas include both andesite and hornblende-containing dacite. Volcanic rocks erupted during both stages of San Pedro belong to the potassium-rich calc-alkaline suite.

San Pedro volcanic rocks are usually glassy with only tiny phenocrysts. Plagioclase and pyroxene are the dominant minerals, with amphibole and olivine being secondary components. The magma feeding the volcano probably formed from the mixing of magmas of distinct temperatures, as indicated by various clues indicating significant thermal disequilibrium between various components. Ultimately they originate in the Altiplano-Puna Magma Body, but undergo storage in shallower crustal magma chambers and absorb crustal gneiss. The eruption of La Poruña appears to have been accompanied by a change in the magma system of the general volcano, a more recent hypothesis regards this cone as a separate volcanic system from San Pedro.

== Climate ==
The region has an arid climate with infrequent precipitation. Moisture ultimately originates on the tropical Atlantic Ocean and much of it rains out as it crosses the Eastern Cordillera and the Altiplano, so that little reaches the western Cordillera, with precipitation in the San Pedro area less than 100 millimetres per year (3.9 in/year) or about 15–18 millimetres (0.59–0.71 in) annually. This dryness may go back to the late Jurassic, but was interrupted during the late ice age between 17,000 and 11,000 years before present by a wetter period during which glaciers expanded. Temperatures strongly fluctuate between day and night; they can go as low as −25 °C (−13 °F) and as high as 25–30 °C (77–86 °F).

== Eruptive history ==
San Pedro formed in two stages, which are known as the Old Cone and the Young Cone. The Old Cone was formed by lava and scoria and later largely buried by glacial, mudflows and volcanic deposits of the Young Cone; it forms about 80% of the volume of the present-day San Pedro edifice. One date has been obtained on Old Cone lavas by argon-argon dating: 160,000 years ago. After activity of the Old Cone ceased, glacial and fluvial erosion dissected San Pedro until the large sector collapse occurred. The so-called "white airfall" with a volume of 2.5 cubic kilometres (0.60 cu mi) as well as pyroclastic flows on the western summit may have been erupted during the collapse but this is uncertain.

Activity of the Young Cone began after the collapse within the scar left by the failure of the edifice. This activity involved the extrusion of four groups of lavas of both andesitic and dacitic composition as well as lava domes and one pumice flow. Apparently, the emission of each lava unit was preceded by explosive eruptions which formed pyroclastic flows. Argon-argon dating on one of these units has yielded an age of 100,000 ± 35,000 years ago. Radiometric and surface-exposure dating has yielded ages of between 110,000 and 56,000 years ago for La Poruña; it was previously proposed that this cone formed in the late 19th century. The La Poruña cone formed in two separate eruptions, each of which yielded a long lava flow; the second eruption remains undated. The southwest dome is of comparable age to La Poruña, 107,000 ± 12 years ago. In general, dates obtained by argon-argon dating range from 168,000 to 68,000 years ago. The entry of mafic magma at depth about 100,000 years ago may have stimulated the occurrence of eruptions not only at San Pedro but also at neighbouring volcanoes.

A large eruption covered parts of the upper edifice with scoria about 15,000 years ago. The Plinian eruption was even more recent, occurring about 10,000 years ago (10,085 ± 45 radiocarbon years ago). After this event four small lava domes formed in the summit region, and partly underwent collapse forming hot avalanche deposits; it is possible that the 1901 eruption was one of these lava dome forming events.

=== Historical activity ===
Eruptions at San Pedro are reported from possibly 1885, when a newspaper from Valparaíso reported "strong shaking of the earth", the emission of large quantities of white steam, and damage to the railway, houses and water pipes. Other eruptions reported from San Pedro were in 1901 when an eruption caused damage, May–August 1910, 1911, February 1938 and a minor event in December 1960. Additional eruptions are mentioned in records and dated to 1870, 1916, 1917, 1923. All these eruptions are uncertain and apparently of phreatic nature, and no geological evidence of them has been found. The timing of eruptions at San Pedro sometimes is unclear; one eruption reported from 1877 may instead have occurred in 1891 as there are two reports of an eruption before 1910 and they may either refer to one eruption with two candidate dates or two eruptions. This volcanic activity makes San Pedro one of the highest active volcanoes.

Presently, fumaroles in the eastern summit crater are the only ongoing activity at San Pedro; a steam plume is barely visible during daylight. The fumarole has formed sulfur deposits and its heat output is visible from space. Based on measurements made in December 2013, the SO_{2} output of San Pedro is about 161 ± 150 tonnes per day (1.86 ± 1.74 kg/s). Fumaroles were also reported from the Ojos de San Pedro area south of San Pedro volcano, and a report published in 1894 mentions a smell of sulfur at La Poruña. In addition, seismic activity has been observed at the volcano, while deformation of the edifice has not been noted.

The history of volcanic activity at San Pedro indicates two principal hazards from future eruptions. The first is the formation of long debris avalanches or pyroclastic flows that could reach the International Route CH-21 which is just 9 kilometres (5.6 mi) away from the volcano. The second hazard is formed by a large explosive eruption resulting in ash fall and the emplacement of ignimbrites; the whole region could be affected if the eruption column is over 20 kilometres (12 mi) high. In light of the height of the edifice, partial collapses are also a possibility. A few seismic stations monitor earthquake activity at San Pedro. The Chilean SERNAGEOMIN publishes a volcano hazard level for the volcano.

== Climbing ==
San Pedro is climbed relatively frequently due to its proximity to the tourist town of San Pedro de Atacama. The easiest route is by the north slopes to the col then by the east slope to the summit. It was first climbed by George Courty (France) and Filemón Morales (Chile) July 16, 1903.

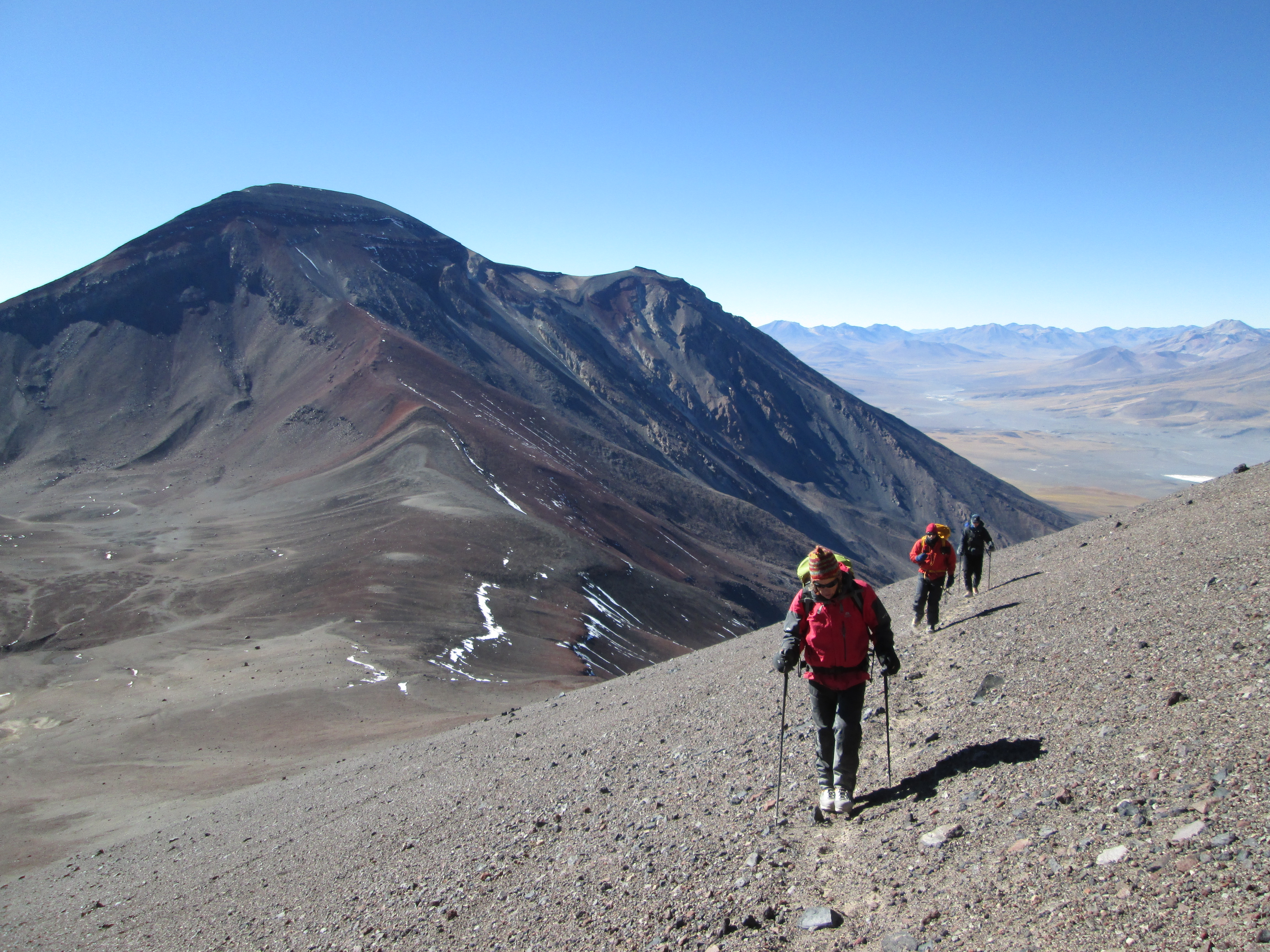
San Pablo volcano as seen from just below the summit of San Pedro

== See also ==
- List of volcanoes in Chile
- List of Ultras of South America
