= San Pablo (volcano) =

Mountain in Chile

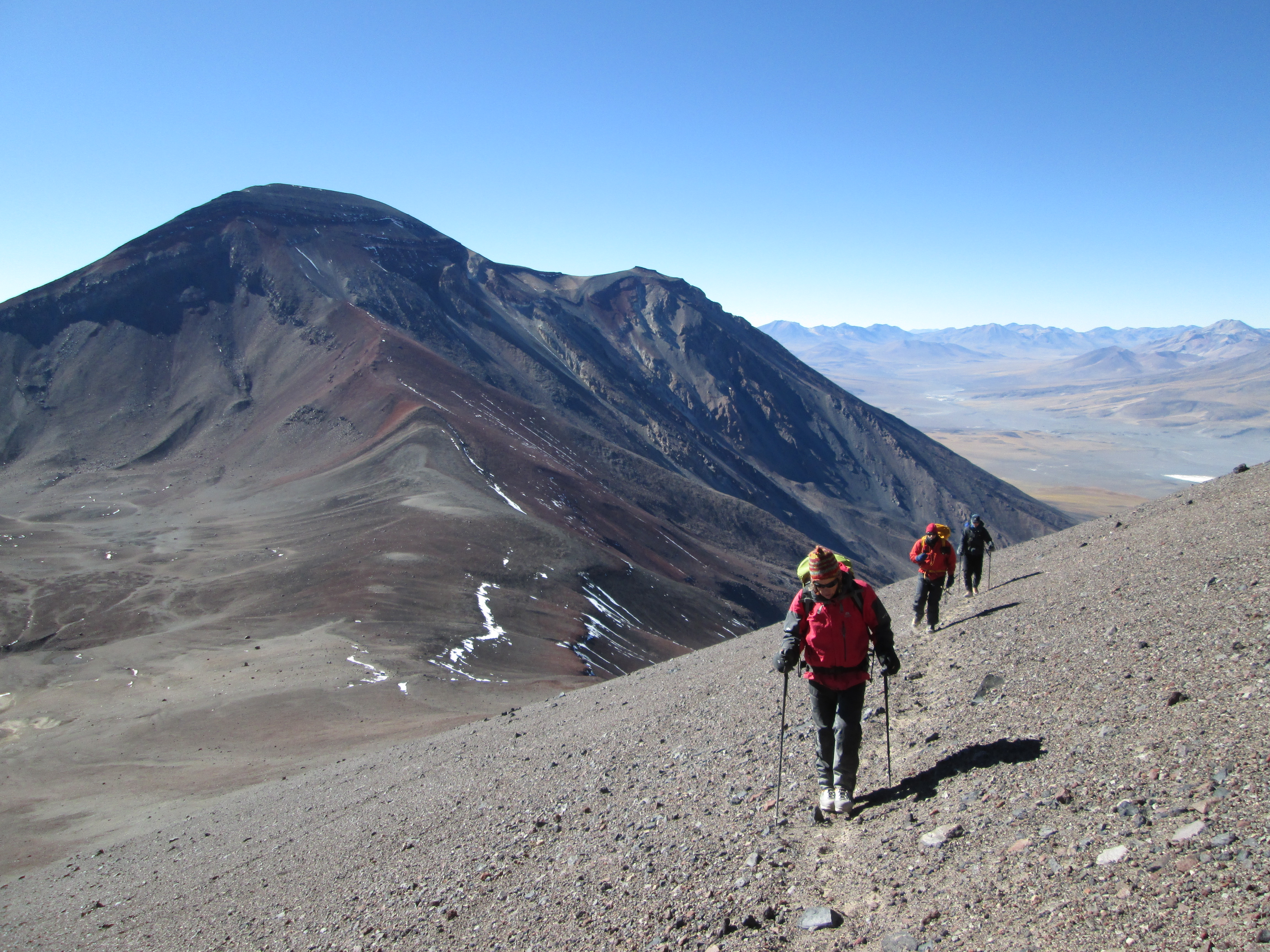
- Volcan San Pablo from just below the summit on San Pedro volcano

Highest point
- Elevation: 6,110 m (20,050 ft)
- Prominence: 808 m (2,651 ft)
- Parent peak: San Pedro
- Coordinates: 21°53′02″S 68°20′33″W

Geography
- Location within Chile
- Location: Chile
- Parent range: Andes

Geology
- Mountain type: Stratovolcano

Climbing
- First ascent: September 1910 by Hans Berger (Germany)
- Easiest route: North side to col then west slopes

San Pablo is a dormant volcano located in the Antofagasta Region of Chile, near the Bolivia border. It is joined to the younger San Pedro volcano by a high col. It is located in the Chilean province of El Loa, city of Calama and Ollagüe.

San Pablo was active in pre-glacial times. After that period, glaciations formed a girdle of moraines and the mountain was covered by ash fall from neighbouring San Pedro. Its central crater was eroded and a glacier formed inside. The volcano itself is formed by three groups of andesite lavas which variously contain pyroxene or hornblende; these groups are known as the Lower Group, the Middle Group and the Summit Group.

== First Ascent ==
San Pablo was first climbed by Hans Berger (Germany) in September 1910.

== Elevation ==
It has an official height of 6050 meters. Other data from available digital elevation models: SRTM yields 6098 metres, ASTER 6076 metres and TanDEM-X 6143 metres. The height of the nearest key col is 5302 meters, leading to a topographic prominence of 808 meters. San Pablo is considered a Mountain Subgroup according to the Dominance System and its dominance is 13.22%. Its parent peak is San Pedro and the Topographic isolation is 5.1 kilometers.

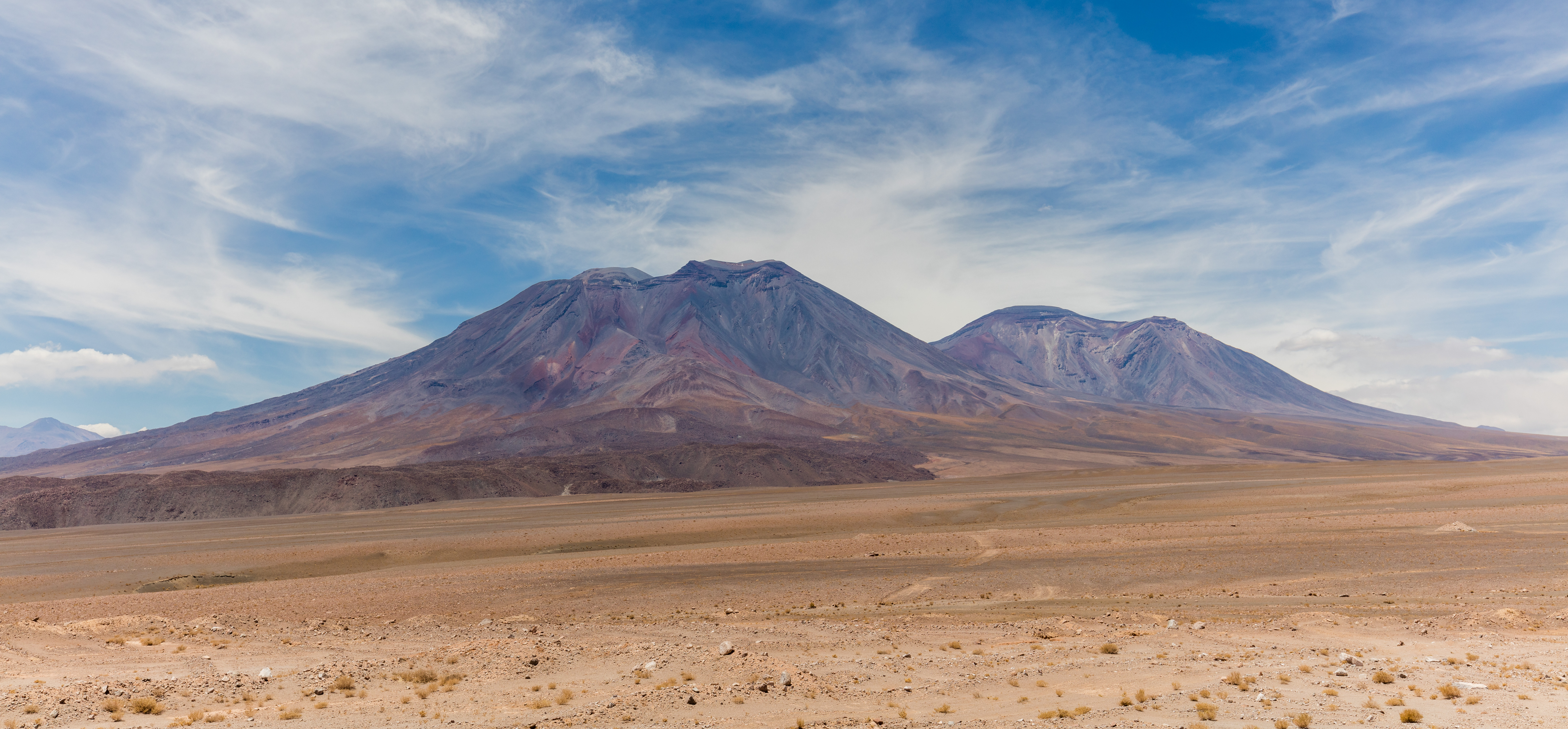
San Pedro volcano on the left and San Pablo volcano on the right
