= Lava dome =

Roughly circular protrusion from slowly extruded viscous volcanic lava

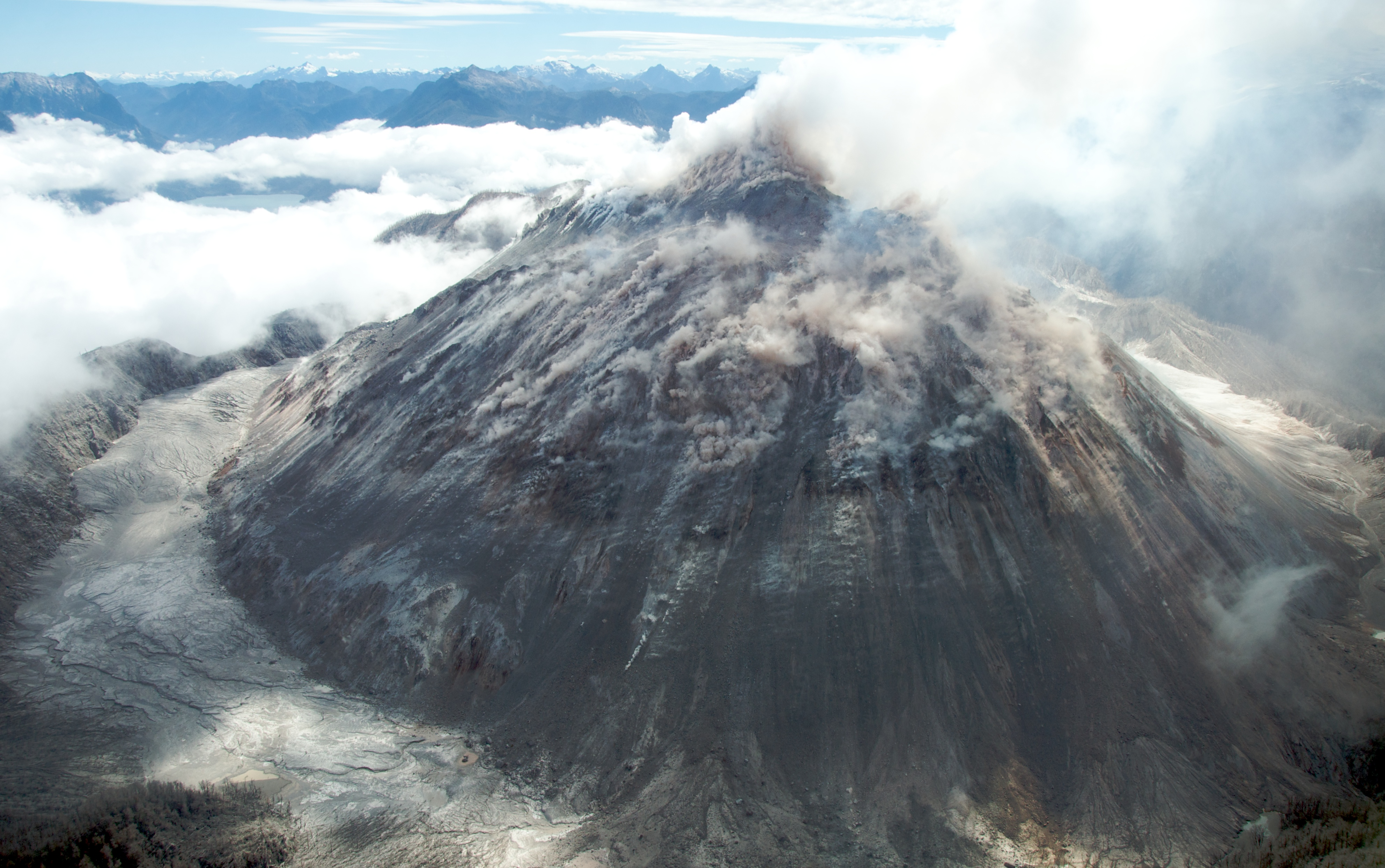
Rhyolitic lava dome of Chaitén Volcano during its 2008–2010 eruption

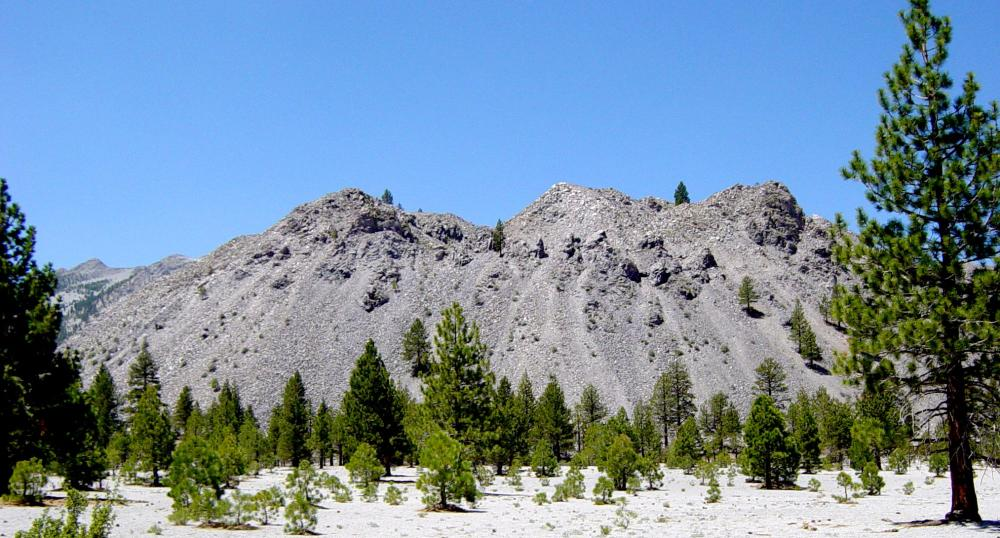
One of the Inyo Craters, an example of a rhyolite dome

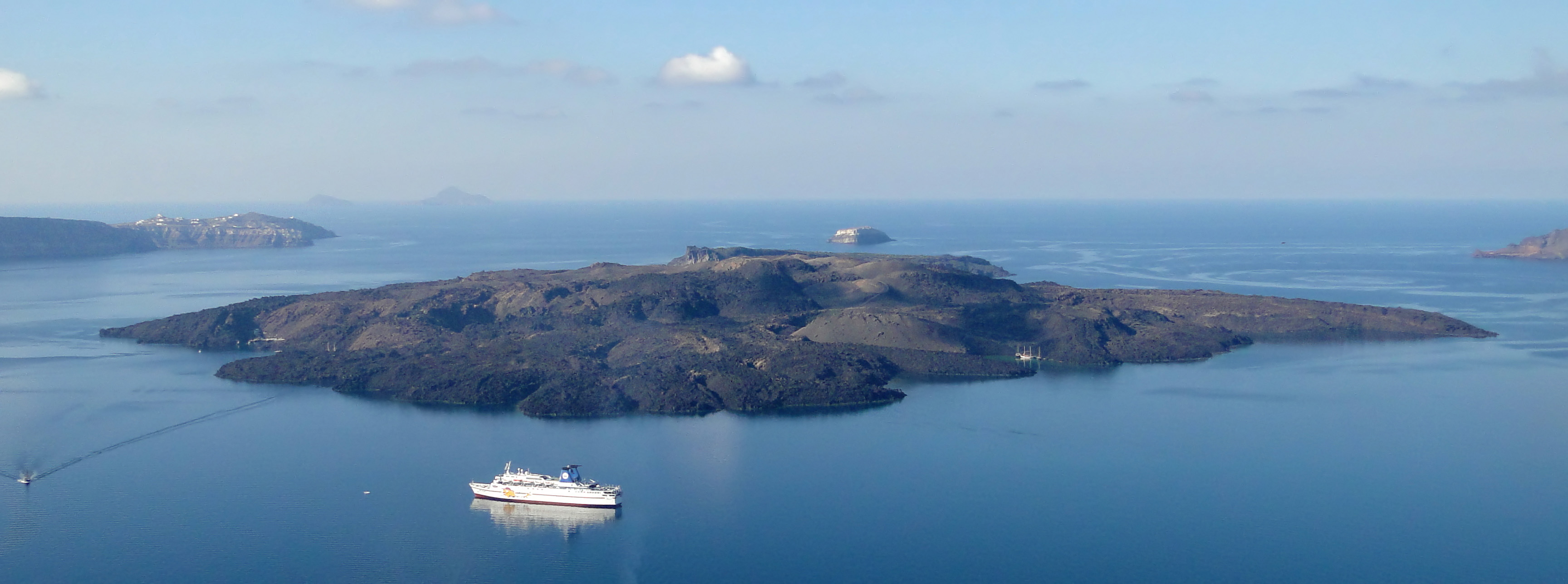
Nea Kameni seen from Thera, Santorini

In volcanology, a lava dome is a circular, mound-shaped protrusion resulting from the slow extrusion of viscous lava from a volcano. Dome-building eruptions are common, particularly in convergent plate boundary settings. Around 6% of eruptions on Earth form lava domes. The geochemistry of lava domes can vary from basalt (e.g. Semeru, 1946) to rhyolite (e.g. Chaiten, 2010) although the majority are of intermediate composition (such as Santiaguito, dacite-andesite, present day). The characteristic dome shape is attributed to high viscosity that prevents the lava from flowing very far. This high viscosity can be obtained in two ways: by high levels of silica in the magma, or by degassing of fluid magma. Since viscous basaltic and andesitic domes weather fast and easily break apart by further input of fluid lava, most of the preserved domes have high silica content and consist of rhyolite or dacite.

Existence of lava domes has been suggested for some domed structures on the Moon, Venus, and Mars, e.g. the Martian surface in the western part of Arcadia Planitia and within Terra Sirenum.

== Dome dynamics ==
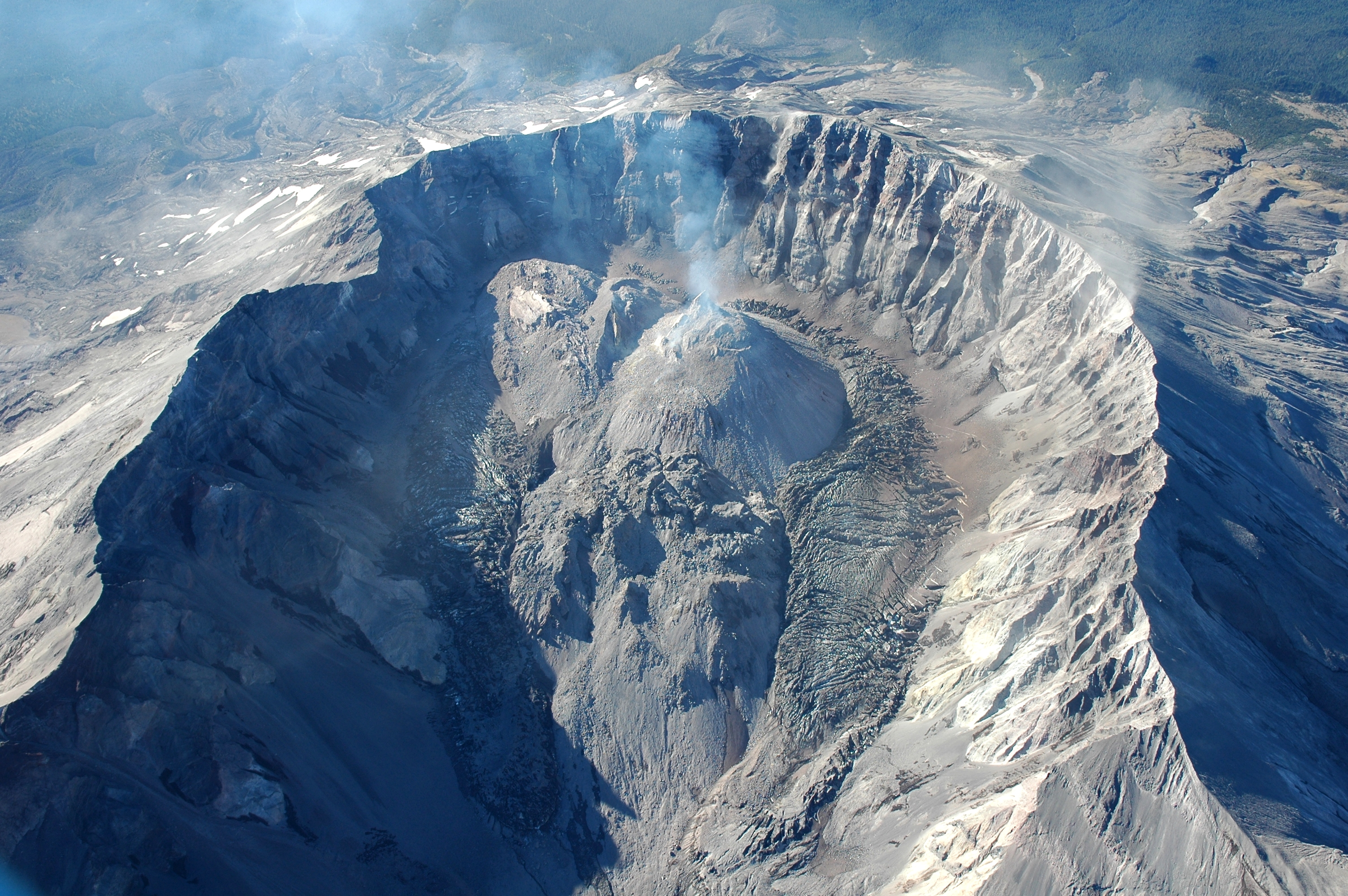
Lava domes in the crater of Mount St. Helens

Lava domes evolve unpredictably, due to non-linear dynamics caused by crystallization and outgassing of the highly viscous lava in the dome's conduit. Domes undergo various processes such as growth, collapse, solidification and erosion.

Lava domes grow by endogenic dome growth or exogenic dome growth. The former implies the enlargement of a lava dome due to the influx of magma into the dome interior, and the latter refers to discrete lobes of lava emplaced upon the surface of the dome. It is the high viscosity of the lava that prevents it from flowing far from the vent from which it extrudes, creating a dome-like shape of sticky lava that then cools slowly in-situ. Spines and lava flows are common extrusive products of lava domes. Domes may reach heights of several hundred meters, and can grow slowly and steadily for months (e.g. Mount Unzen volcano), years (e.g. Soufrière Hills volcano), or even centuries (e.g. Mount Merapi volcano). The sides of these structures are composed of unstable rock debris. Due to the intermittent buildup of gas pressure, erupting domes can often experience episodes of explosive eruption over time. If part of a lava dome collapses and exposes pressurized magma, pyroclastic flows can be produced. Other hazards associated with lava domes are the destruction of property from lava flows, forest fires, and lahars triggered from re-mobilization of loose ash and debris. Lava domes are one of the principal structural features of many stratovolcanoes worldwide. Lava domes are prone to unusually dangerous explosions since they can contain rhyolitic silica-rich lava.

Characteristics of lava dome eruptions include shallow, long-period and hybrid seismicity, which is attributed to excess fluid pressures in the contributing vent chamber. Other characteristics of lava domes include their hemispherical dome shape, cycles of dome growth over long periods, and sudden onsets of violent explosive activity. The average rate of dome growth may be used as a rough indicator of magma supply, but it shows no systematic relationship to the timing or characteristics of lava dome explosions.

Gravitational collapse of a lava dome can produce a block and ash flow.

== Related landforms ==
=== Cryptodomes ===
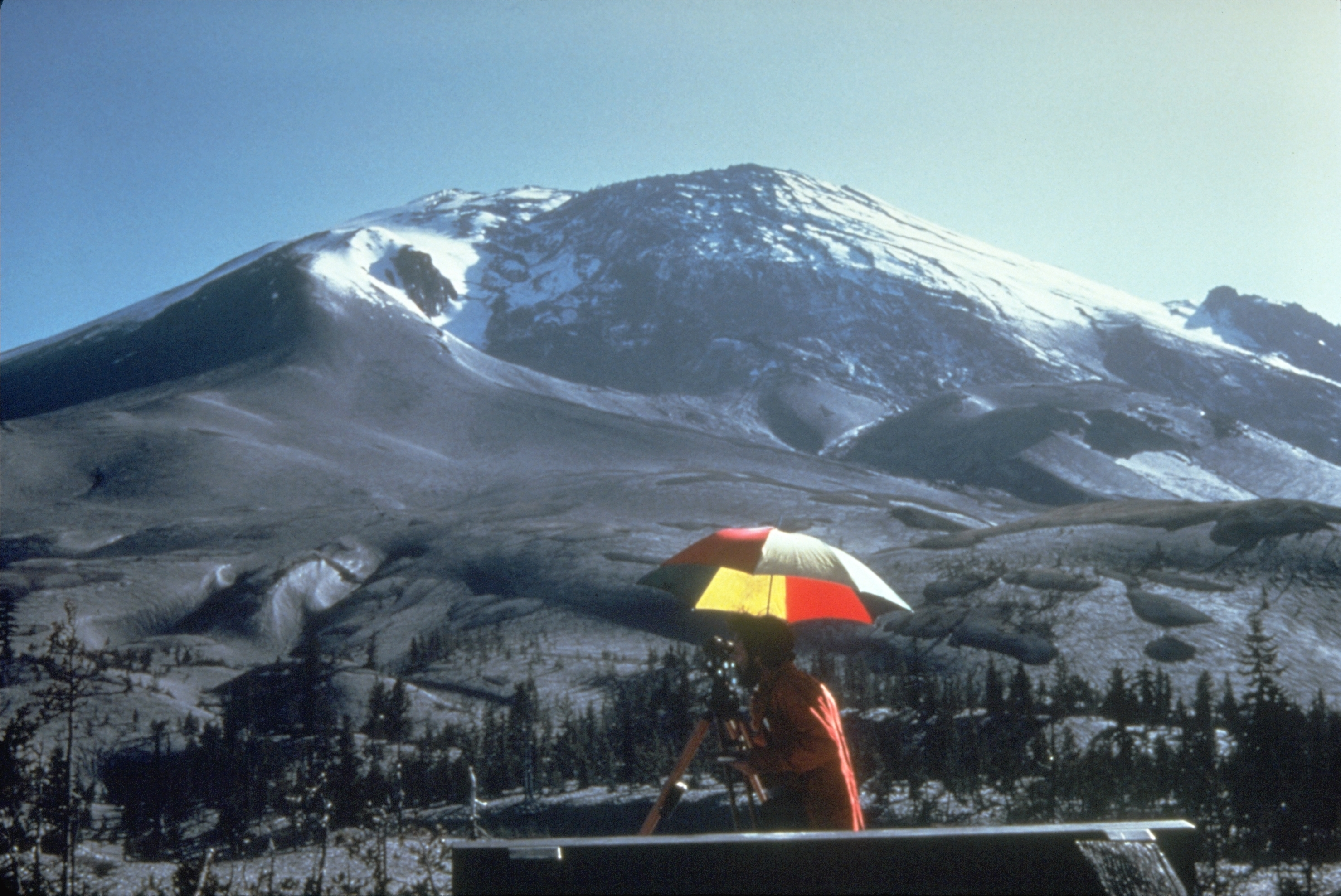
The bulging cryptodome of Mt. St. Helens on April 27, 1980

A cryptodome (from the Greek κρυπτός, kryptos, "hidden, secret") is a dome-shaped structure created by accumulation of viscous magma at a shallow depth. Two examples of cryptodomes were the ones leading to the 1956 eruption of Bezymianny and the 1980 eruption of Mount St. Helens. In each case, the explosive eruption began after the cryptodome caused the side of the volcano to bulge outward and led to a sector collapse, in turn leading to explosive decompression of the subterranean cryptodome.

=== Lava spine/Lava spire ===
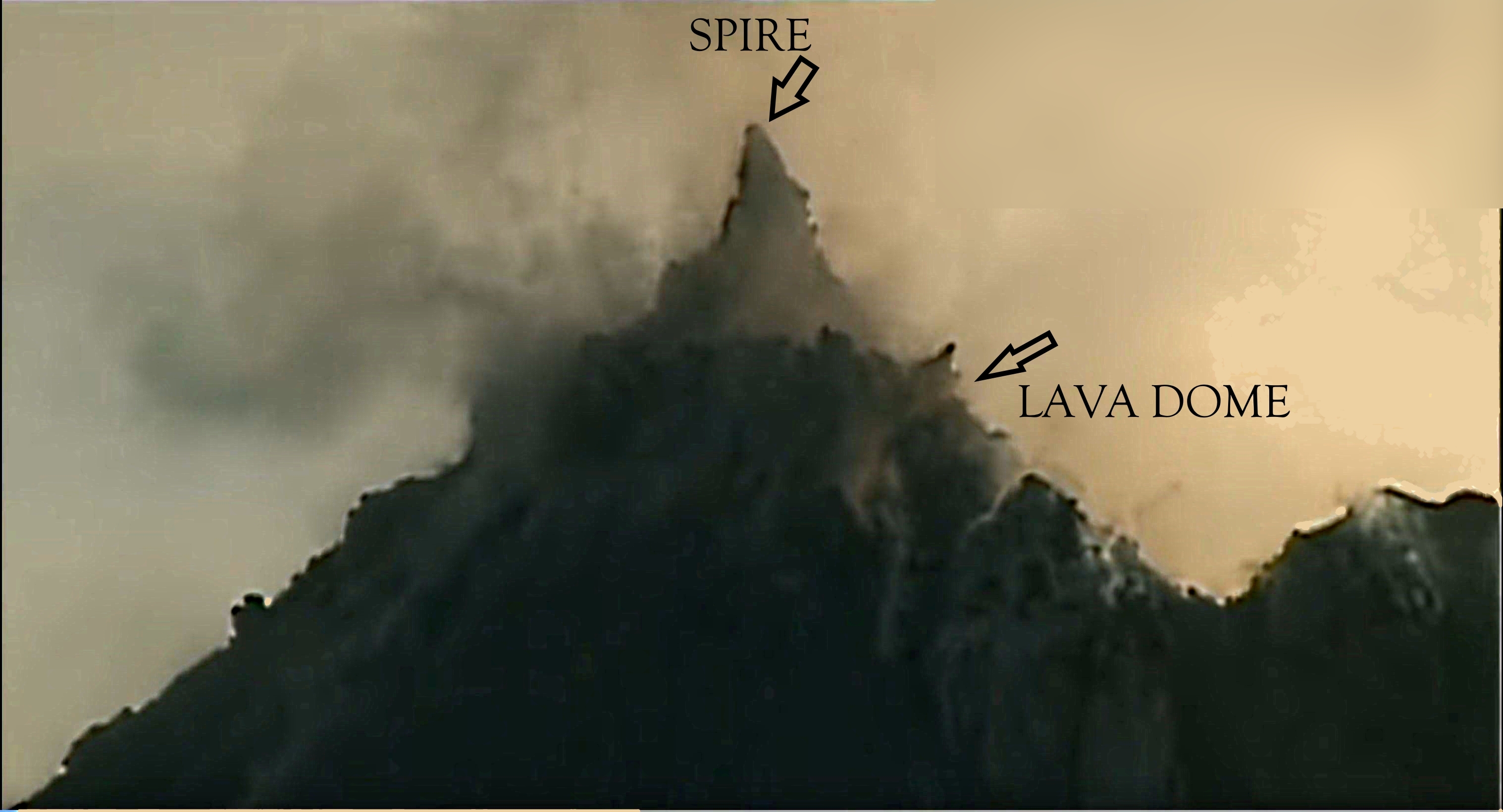
Soufrière Hills lava spine before the 1997 eruption

Lava dome growth during the 2004–2008 eruptive phase of Mount St Helens

A lava spine or lava spire is a growth that can form on the top of a lava dome. A lava spine can increase the instability of the underlying lava dome. A recent example of a lava spine is the spine formed in 1997 at the Soufrière Hills Volcano on Montserrat.

=== Lava coulées ===
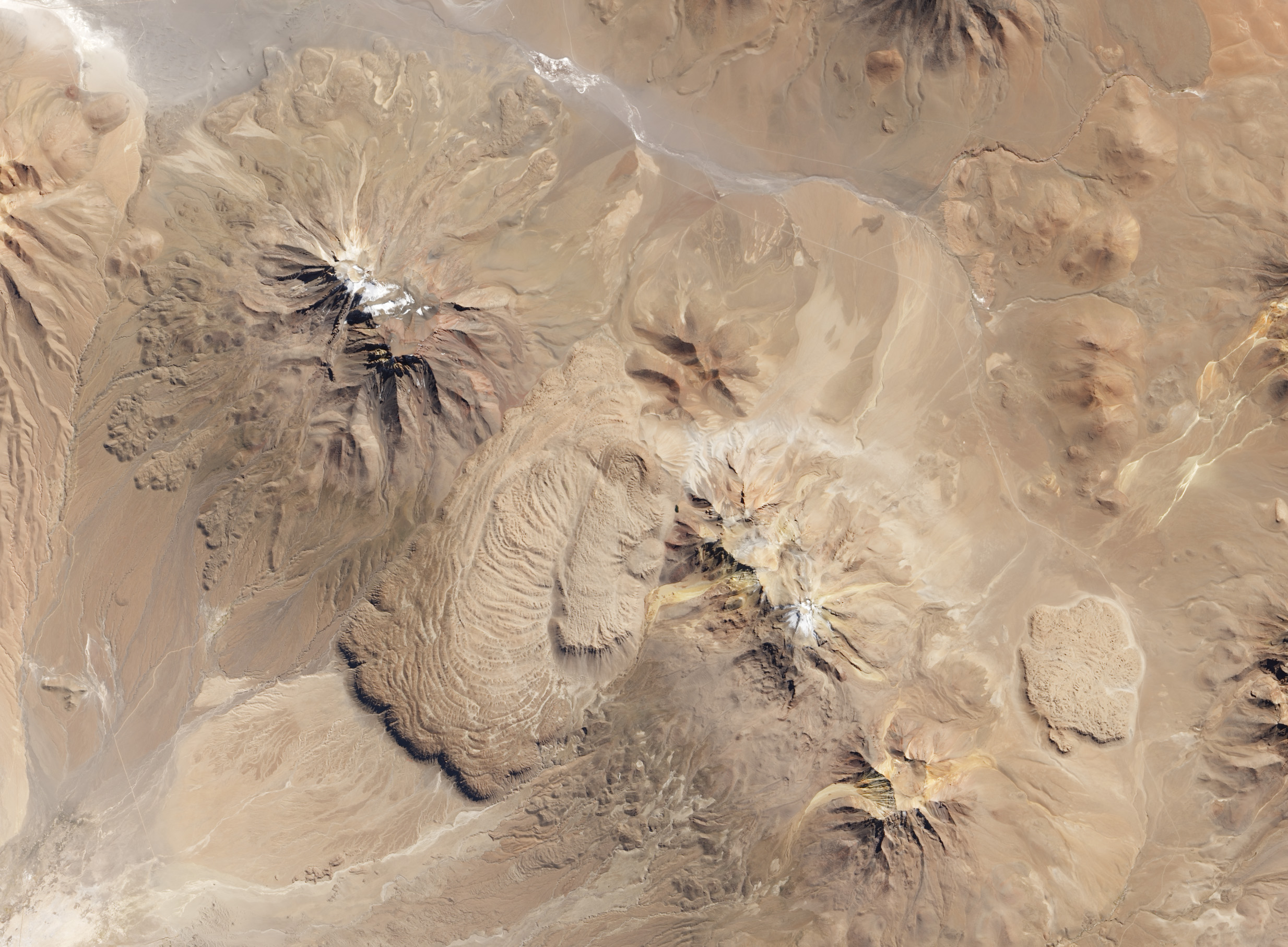
Chao dacite coulée flow-domes (left center), northern Chile, viewed from Landsat 8

Coulées (or coulees) are lava domes that have experienced some flow away from their original position, thus resembling both lava domes and lava flows.

The world's largest known dacite flow is the Chao dacite dome complex, a huge coulée flow-dome between two volcanoes in northern Chile. This flow is over 14 kilometres (8.7 mi) long, has obvious flow features like pressure ridges, and a flow front 400 metres (1,300 ft) tall (the dark scalloped line at lower left). There is another prominent coulée flow on the flank of Llullaillaco volcano, in Argentina, and other examples in the Andes.

== Examples of lava domes ==
Lava domes
Name of lava dome	Country	Volcanic area	Composition	Last eruption or growth episode
Bijang	Philippines	Macolod Corridor	Dacite	66 ± 14ka
Chaitén lava dome	Chile	Southern Volcanic Zone	Rhyolite	2009
Ciomadul lava domes	Romania	Carpathians	Dacite	Pleistocene
Cordón Caulle lava domes	Chile	Southern Volcanic Zone	Rhyolite	2012
Galeras lava dome	Colombia	Northern Volcanic Zone	Unknown	2010
Katla lava dome	Iceland	Iceland hotspot	Rhyolite	1999
Lassen Peak	United States	Cascade Volcanic Arc	Dacite	1917
Black Butte (Siskiyou County, California)	United States	Cascade Volcanic Arc	Dacite	9500 BP
Bridge River Vent lava dome	Canada	Cascade Volcanic Arc	Dacite	ca. 300 BC
La Soufrière lava dome	Saint Vincent and the Grenadines	Lesser Antilles Volcanic Arc	Andesite	2021
Mount Merapi lava dome	Indonesia	Sunda Arc	Basaltic Andesite	2010 onwards
Nea Kameni	Greece	South Aegean Volcanic Arc	Dacite	1950
Novarupta lava dome	United States	Aleutian Arc	Rhyolite	1912
Nevados de Chillán lava domes	Chile	Southern Volcanic Zone	Dacite	1986
Puy de Dôme	France	Chaîne des Puys	Potassic trachyte	c. 5760 BC
Santa María lava dome	Guatemala	Central America Volcanic Arc	Dacite	2009
Sollipulli lava dome	Chile	Southern Volcanic Zone	Andesite to Dacite	1240 ± 50 years
Soufrière Hills lava dome	Montserrat	Lesser Antilles	Andesite	2009
Mount St. Helens lava domes	United States	Cascade Volcanic Arc	Dacite	2008
Torfajökull lava dome	Iceland	Iceland hotspot	Rhyolite	1477
Tata Sabaya lava domes	Bolivia	Andes	Andesite	~ Holocene
Tate-iwa	Japan	Japan Arc	Dacite	Miocene
Tatun lava domes	Taiwan		Andesite	648
Valles lava domes	United States	Jemez Mountains	Rhyolite	50,000-60,000 BP
Wizard Island lava dome	United States	Cascade Volcanic Arc	High silica dacite to low silica rhyolite (rhyodacite)	2850 BC
