= Alto Loa National Reserve =

Conservation area in northern Chile

- Reserva nacional Alto Loa
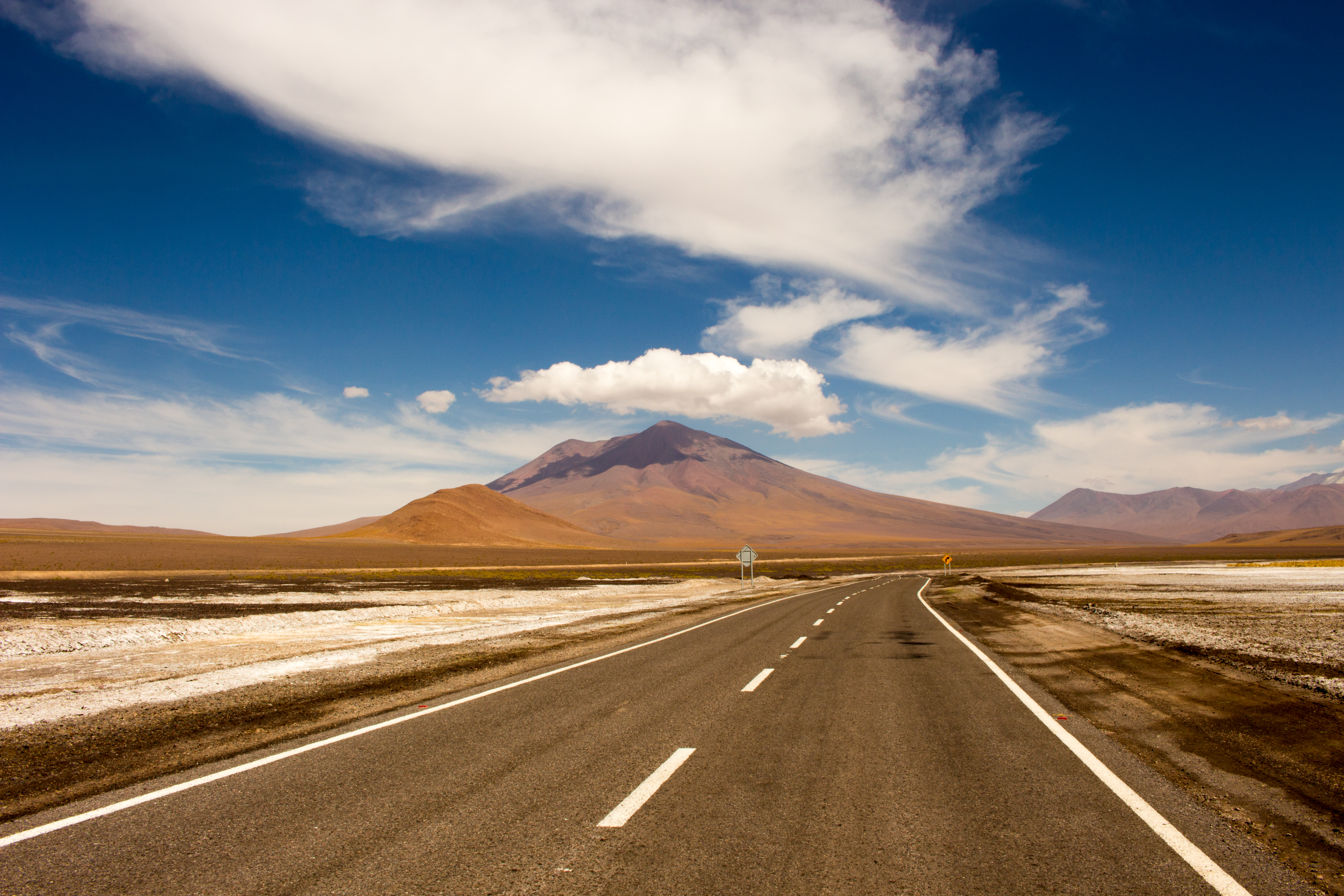
- A stretch of route 21 that goes through the reserve
- Interactive map of Alto Loa National Reserve
- Location: Chile
- Nearest city: Ollagüe, Chile
- Coordinates: 21°27′S 68°33′W
- Area: 300,000 ha (740,000 acres)
- Created: August 2005
- Governing body: CONAF, National Forest Corporation (Chile)
- Operator: Consejo de Pueblos Atacameños

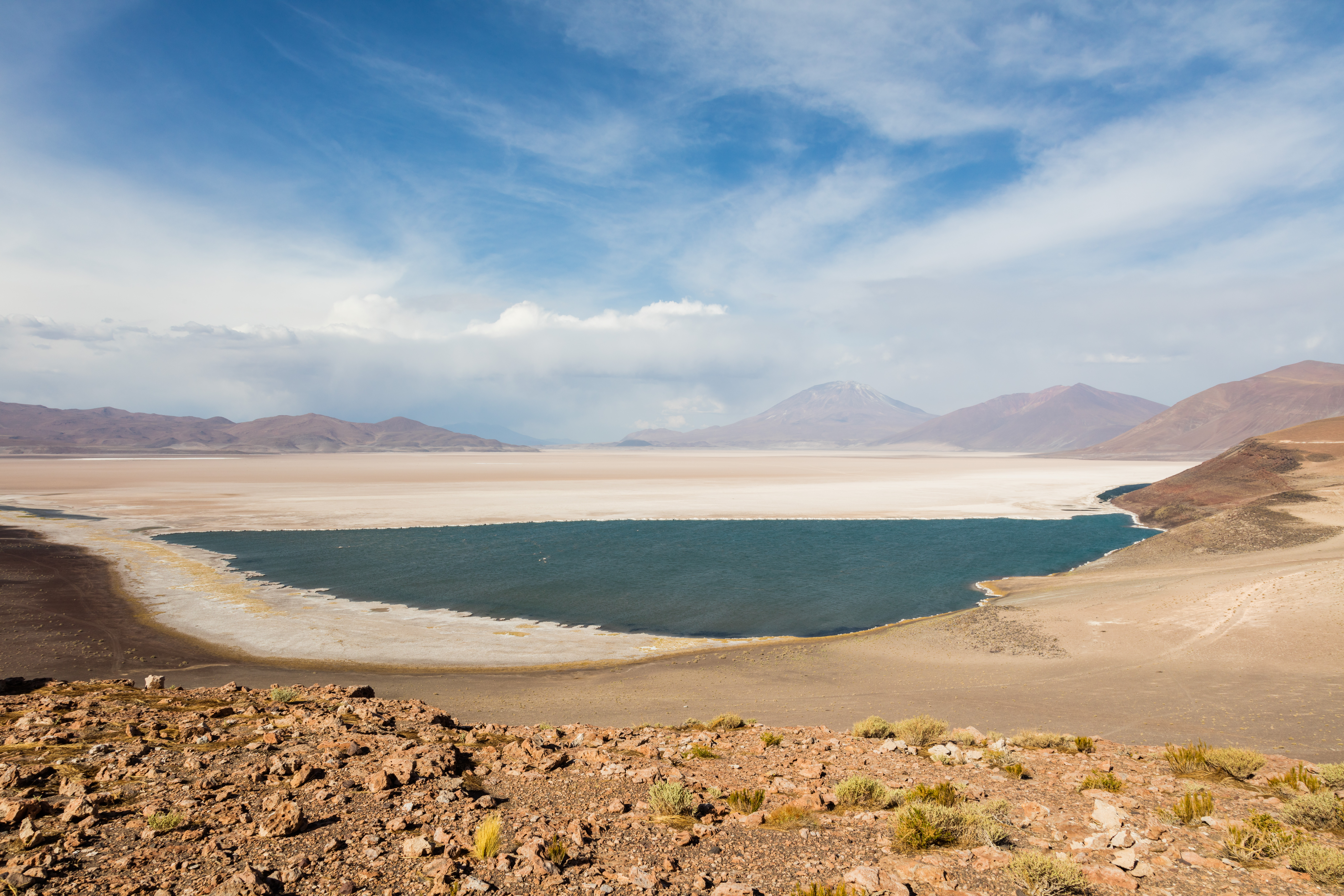
Salar de Carcote, en las cercanías de Ollagüe.

Alto Loa National Reserve is a protected area located in the province of El Loa, Antofagasta region, Chile. Announced in 2002 and created in 2005, it is Chile's largest natural reserve.

== The reserve ==
Alto Loa is located at 3,000 metres (9,800 ft) elevation between the communes of Ollagüe and Calama, 215 kilometres (134 mi) northeast of Antofagasta. The total surface area of the reserve is approximately 300,000 hectares, making it the largest natural reserve in Chile. The climate is desertic, with only 3 mm (0.12 in) precipitation a year and temperatures of 25.5 °C (77.9 °F) maximum and 17.1 °C (62.8 °F) minimum. The main aim of the reserve is to protect the source of the Loa River (4,277 m altitude), and the vegetal and animal species that depend on the river ecosystem in an area of desert climate. Among the animal species can be found the guanaco, condor, viscacha and cougar. plant species include the tabaquillo or queñoa (Polylepis australis) and the yareta or llareta. Along with its native flora and fauna, Alto Loa is the home of three salt flats: San Martín or Carcote; Ascotán: and Ollagüe.

Another of the park's objectives is to support the social and economic development of the local native communities through the operation of tourist concessions in the reserve.

The nearest settlement to the reserve is the small village of Ollagüe, and it is also close to the mining city of Calama.

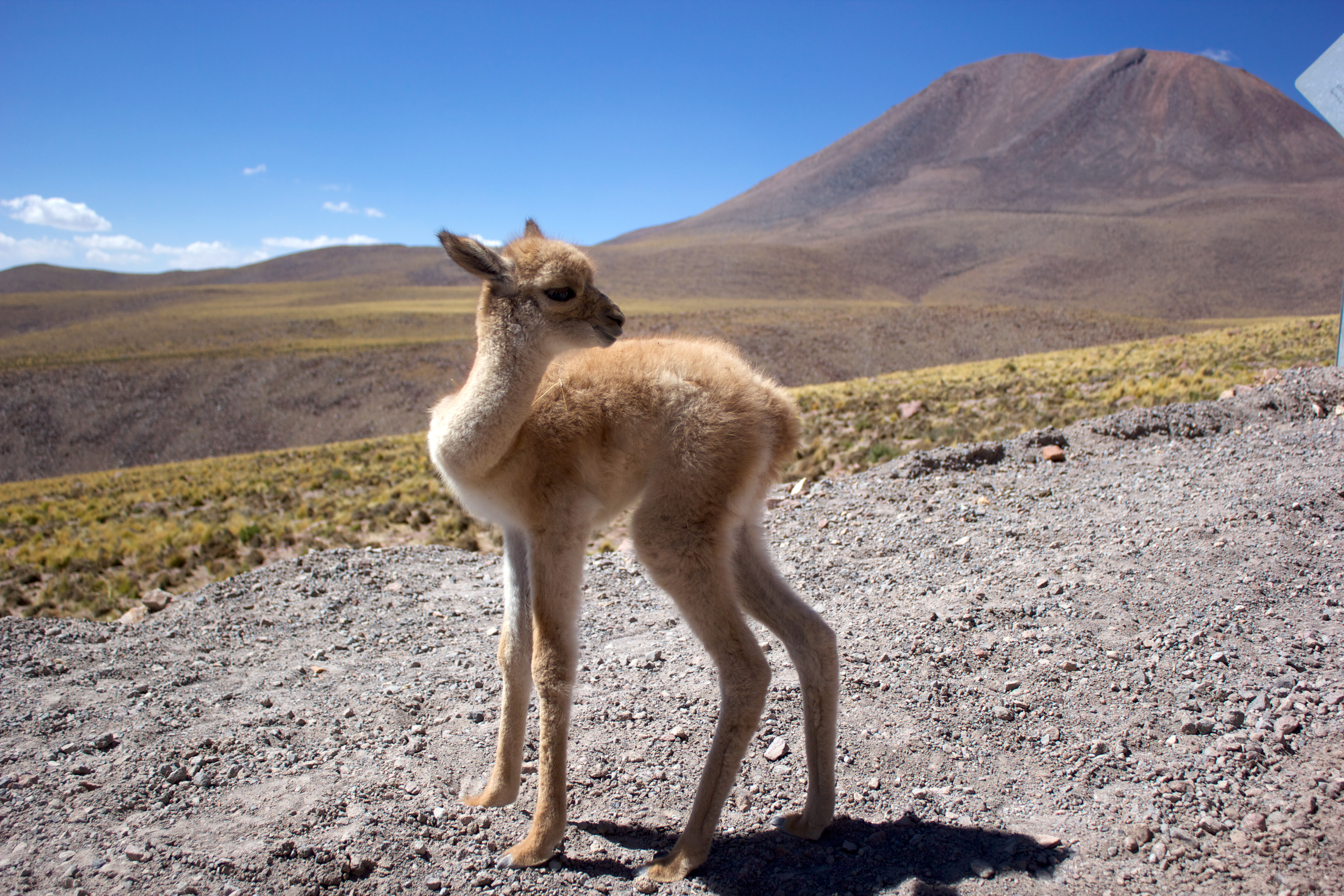
Vicuña fawn, one of the species found in the Alto Loa Natural Reserve

== Origins of Alto Loa ==
The reserve was officially created in 2005 following 6 years of negotiation between the Regional Department of Agriculture (Secretaría Regional Ministerial de Agricultura), the Quechua community of Ollagüe, and the mining companies Codelco and SQM. The purpose of the reserve is to protect an area of 300 thousand hectares known as Alto Loa, which extends from the border with Bolivia in the northeast to the salt flats of Ascotán and Carcote in the southeast.

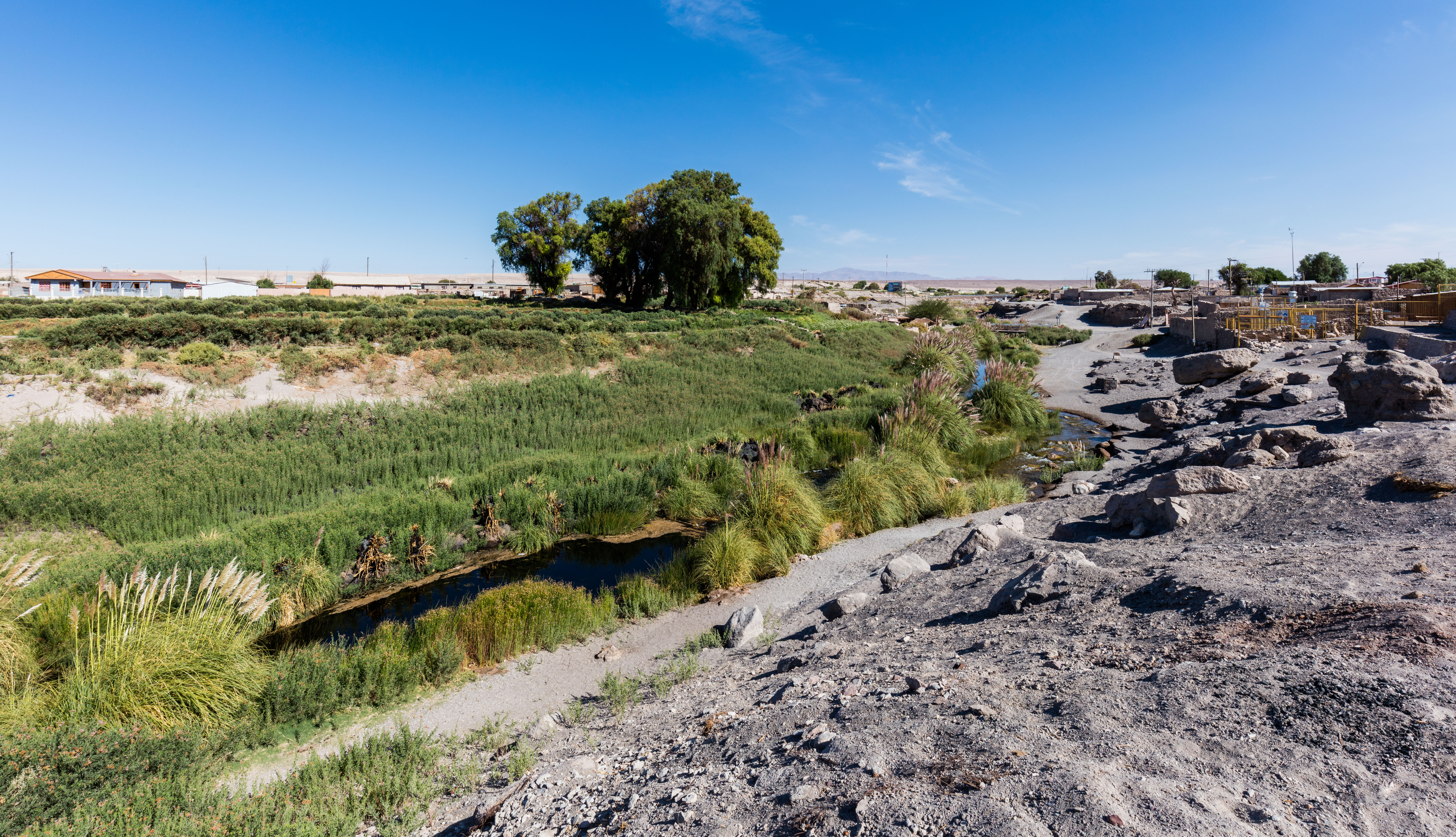
Loa River near the city of Chiu Chiu

Large sections of the park, were previously given as concessions to mining companies and native communities for the exploitation of minerals and water. In order to form the natural reserve, the government had to reach an agreement with all concession holders. The agreement allows the mining companies to make use of the permits granted before the creation of the natural reserve while allowing the creation of a protected area for more than 250 vegetal species and 70 animal species.

The native communities

The "Consejo de Pueblos Atacameños" (Council of Atacama Peoples), the organization that represents the Atacama and Quechua people of the region, has been in constant dialogue with the government and the mining companies to highlight concerns about the mining work and the lack of protection of the wetlands, a flamingo nesting area. There are three species nesting in the reserve: the Chilean, James and Andean flamingos. But the community has also communicated their satisfaction with what has been achieved in terms of ethno tourism. Although the reserve is administrated by CONAF, the Quechua community in Ollagüe, a town 205 km northeast of Calama, is responsible for developing tourism in the reserve, protecting its natural and cultural heritage, and administrating the land that they claim as their own. Similar examples of native communities successfully running tourism efforts in the region's natural areas include Valle de la Luna, San Pedro de Atacama.

== See also ==
- List of national parks of Chile
- CONAF
