= Battle of Tambillo =

- Part of War of the Pacific
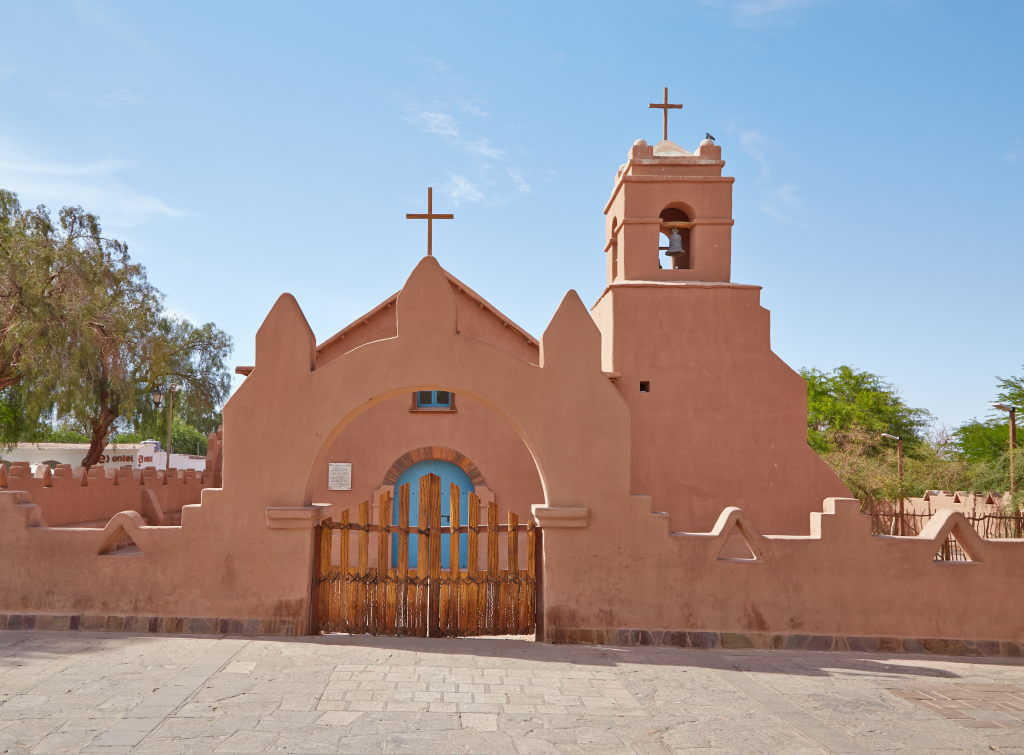
- The Church located in San Pedro de Atacama
| Date | December 6, 1879 |
| Location | San Pedro de Atacama, El Loa, Chile 23°06′58″S 68°04′37″W |
| Result | Bolivian victory |

Belligerents
| Bolivia | Chile |

Commanders and leaders
| Rufino Carrasco | Emilio Ferreira |

Units involved
| 5th Division | Unknown |

Strength
| 70 Infantry | 24 Infantry |

Casualties and losses
| 2 killed, 1 injured | 9 killed, 11 captured |
- Location within Chile Battle of Tambillo (South America) Battle of Tambillo (America)

The Battle of Tambillo was a battle of the War of the Pacific that occurred on December 6, 1879, between the Bolivian 5th Division under the command of Colonel Rufino Carrasco and the Chilean garrison stationed at the town commanded by Lieutenant Emilio Ferreira.

== Background ==
After recognizing the result of the Battle of Topáter, the civilians in Bolivia mobilized and formed various battalions. This way, the 5th Division was formed under the command of General Narciso Campero Leyes, who later became president of the Republic of Bolivia. Within the 5th Division was the Vanguardia Sniper Mobilized Squad, a cavalry unit made up of horsemen from Cotagaiteños, Tupiceños and Tarijeños, under the command of Colonel Rufino Carrasco. In mid-1879, the 5th Division set out from Tupiza to Potosí and stayed in the department for a few weeks. One of the shortcomings of the 5th Division was its lack of military implements, uniforms, food and fodder which made them look more like a heap than a regular army.

While the 5th Division was camping in Potosí, on September 10, 1879, a group of 40 Bolivian civilians, under the command of Jaime Hoyos, ambushed the platoon of 25 Chilean hunters on horseback under the command of Lieutenant Ríos, who was stationed in Río Grande, a town north of San Pedro de Atacama. The montonera was defeated by the Chilean detachment, killing Hoyos and his second-in-command.

Carrasco requested permission to take his snipers as an exploratory outpost and, after a journey through the Topaquincha pass, his troops occupied Chiuchiu on November 25, 1879, but after a shootout between the Bolivians and Chileans on the road from Chiuchiu to Calama, both armies withdrew, which canceled the initial plan of Carrasco's forces to claim Calama.

Bolivian troops took refuge north of San Pedro de Atacama. On December 3, a 3-man Chilean picket ran into Carrasco's forces; one was killed, another captured and the other managed to flee, giving the alarm to Commander Barboza. To pursue him and not give the enemy time to prepare for the attack, Carrasco and his men set out on San Pedro de Atacama. Lieutenant Emilio Ferreira, commander of the Chilean garrison of San Pedro de Atacama, as soon as he received the message from his soldier, he deployed his 23 men in the Tambillo gorge, a league and a half north of the town. When his men were surprised by the Bolivian troops, Lieutenant Ferreira sent soldiers to request reinforcements from Caracoles, where the head of the commander of the El Loa garrison and commander of the infantry battalion was.

== The Battle ==
The battle began in the early hours of the 6th, as soon as the Chileans, sheltered behind some stone walls, spotted the opposing forces and opened fire on them. Carrasco had ordered Lieutenant Colonel Moscoso to attack from the left, Lieutenant Colonel Patiño from the front, while he with the reserve surrounded the enemy from the right. After thirty minutes of gunfire and his ammunition exhausted, Ferreira was forced to retreat, being dislodged from his positions by the Bolivian horsemen. Because they were dismounted and because their mounts had been dispersed during the confusion of the combat, the Chilean soldiers were easily killed or captured by the Bolivian cavalry. Only Lieutenant Ferreira and three soldiers managed to escape. The Chilean force consisted of recently recruited peasants in the south who had barely done a target practice (three bullets per man). The park that they had in San Pedro was scarce, since an incursion of the allies was not envisaged.

Carrasco's forces recognized 2 dead and 1 wounded, while those of Ferreira left 9 dead and 19 prisoners in the camp. The loot taken by Carrasco consisted of 18 Winchester rifles with some endowment, 14 swords and 16 horses with their mounts and straps.

After the combat, Carrasco's forces occupied the town, immediately requesting General Campero to send reinforcements to hold their position. When he did not receive a response and after carrying out a short reconnaissance to the south, he chose to withdraw to Bolivia, crossing the mountain range again.

The 70 grenadiers and 30 "Desert Hunters", dispatched by Commander Bouquet in order to assist Ferreira and cut off the retreat of the Bolivian forces, arrived in San Pedro de Atacama when the combat had already ended and the Bolivians had withdrawn.

== Aftermath ==
The string of conspiracies in the Bolivian high power and President Hilarión Daza's fear that Campero would take away popular acceptance, caused the president to order abort the mission of the 5th Division and withdraw it to Oruro until new orders, with which Bolivia would lose any further opportunity to recover its coast.

The news of this confrontation caused a commotion in the Chilean forces occupying Antofagasta, as they believed that it could be the appearance of the vanguards of the 5th Division of Campero, announced so many times in march on the coast, a campaign that was never carried out. The Chilean command dispatched reinforcement troops to the interior and because almost all of the men under its command were lost, a court martial was followed against Lieutenant Ferreira. His defender was Lieutenant Colonel Rafael Díaz Muñoz. During 1880, he was acquitted and rejoined the army and fought until the Lima Campaign.

After the Battle of Topáter, where the Chilean army fought against Bolivian civilians, this was the last combat between the standalone armies of Bolivia and Chile; in following battles, Peru and Bolivia would fight together against Chile.
