= Iglesia de San Francisco (Chiu Chiu) =

National monument of Chile

Coordinates: 22°20′34″S 68°39′02″W

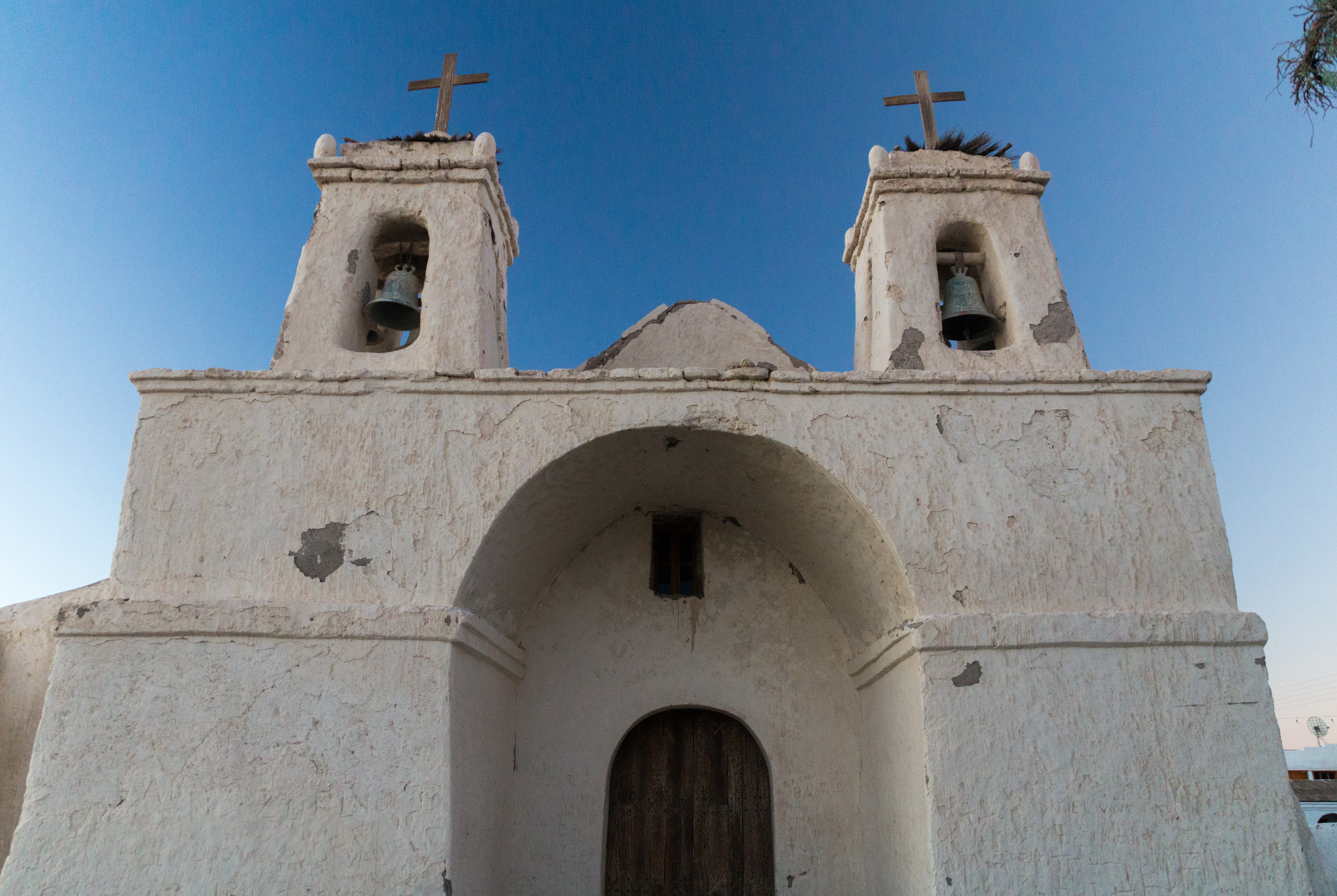

Religion
- Affiliation: Roman Catholic

Location
- Municipality: Calama
- Country: Chile
- Interactive map of Iglesia de San Francisco

Architecture
- Completed: c. 1650

The Iglesia de San Francisco is a Roman Catholic church located in the commune of Calama, El Loa, Antofagasta Region, Chile. Built in c. 1650, it is the oldest church in Chile. It was declared as a National Monument in 1951.

== History ==
The church of San Francisco de Chiu Chiu was built in the mid 17th century. It is adjacent to the square of Chiu Chiu. In 1965, the Architecture Branch of the Ministerio de Obras Públicas de Chile carried out a renovation project, which included the replacement of the wooden belfries with two stone belfries on the main facade. The first ones, in turn, had replaced the original belfries, which collapsed in the 19th century.

== Description ==
The church has a Latin cross plan. The nave is 27 metres (89 ft) long and 5 metres (16 ft) wide. The walls of the church are of adobe and are 1.2 metres (3.9 ft) thick. The collar beam roof, made of chañar, algarrobo and cactus, was fastened with leather strips and is nail-free. The roof is covered with a thick layer of mud and straw.

The church features a barrel-vaulted entrance. An exterior wall is buttressed by a stepped wall, which leads to the belfries and to the mud covered roof.

The church is located in a walled site where there are graves. The interior of the church contains a crucifix that is taken out from it during the processions and a painting of Jesus Christ being mistreated.
