= Iglesia de Caspana =

Catholic church in Caspana, Chile

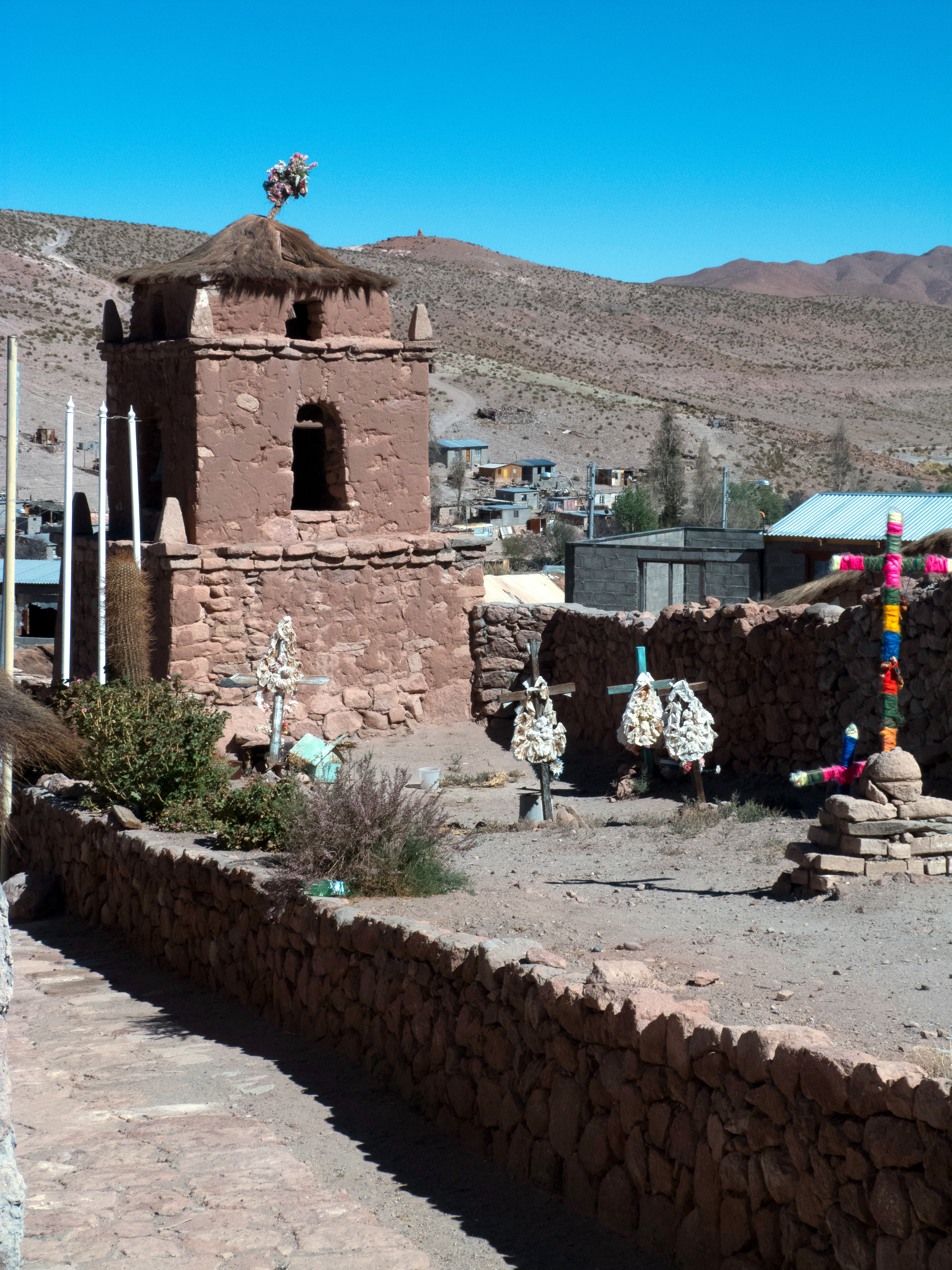

Religion
- Affiliation: Roman Catholic

Location
- Municipality: Calama
- Country: Chile
- Interactive map of Iglesia de Caspana

The Iglesia de Caspana is a Catholic church located in the locality of Caspana, in Calama, Antofagasta Region, Chile. Built in the 17th century, it was declared a Historic Monument, on July 6, 1951.

== History ==
Its construction date is estimated to be in the first half of the 17th century, which is based on a chronicle that dates back to 1641 where the church is mentioned. The original structure of the church was modified by the addition of a buttress on the front facade in 1862 and an annex on its southern side in 1975.

== Description ==
The church is made of stone with mud mortar, with a timber roof truss made from cardón and chañar. It has a narrow and elongated nave, a choir gallery on the entrance and a reredos.

The detached bell tower contains two bells, and is built of stone and mud.
