= Salado River (Antofagasta) =

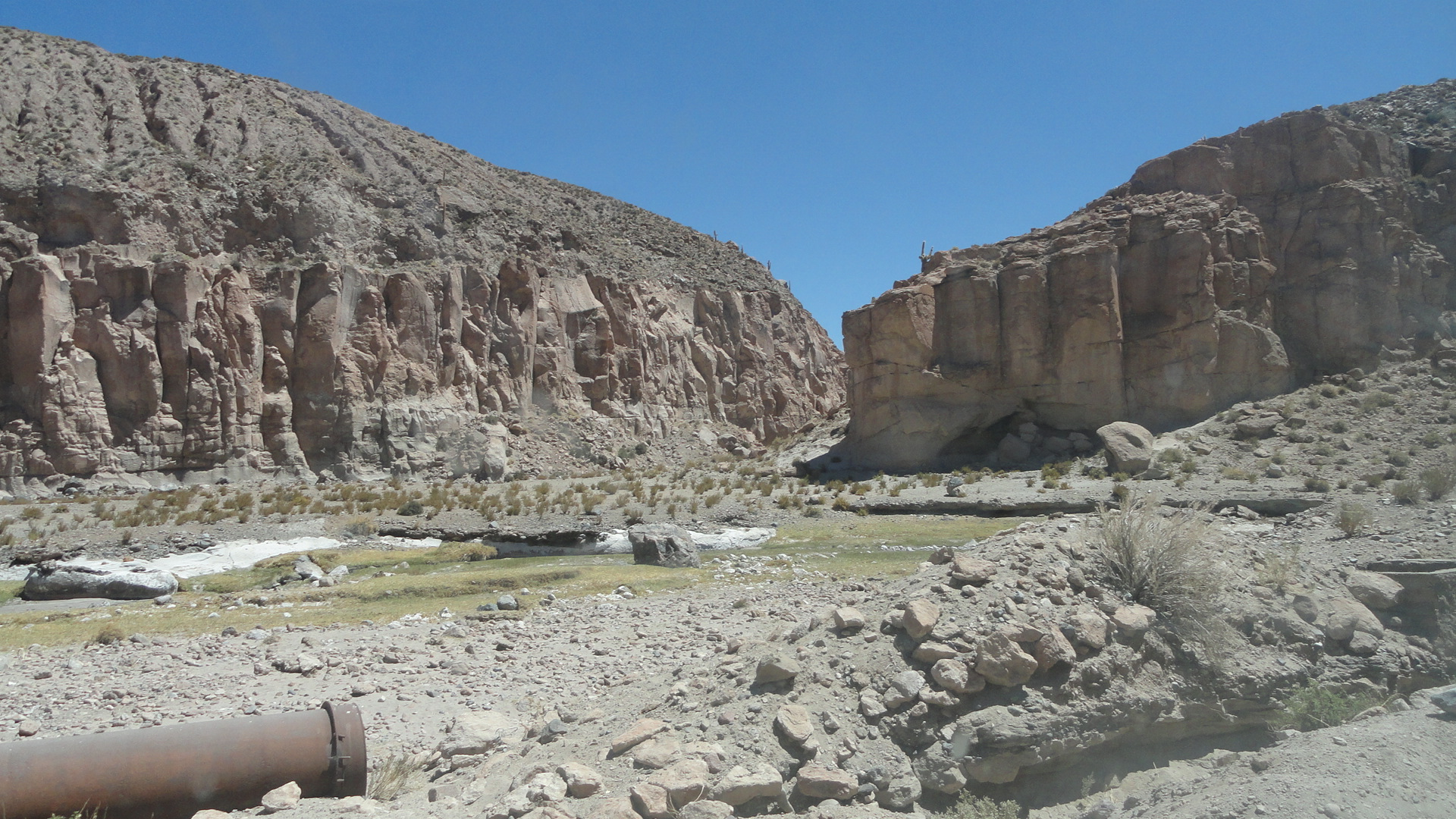

- Loa and its tributaries San Pedro, Silala and Salado Rivers

Location
- Country: Chile

Physical characteristics
- Source
  - location: Thermal springs
  - elevation: 4,200 m (13,800 ft)
- Mouth
  - location: Loa River
  - coordinates: 22.3711°S 68.6554°W
- Length: 80 km (50 mi)
- Basin size: 2,210 km^{2} (850 sq mi)
- Discharge
  - average: 0.5 m^{3}/s (18 cu ft/s)

Salado River is a river of Chile located in El Loa Province, Antofagasta Region which is in the northern part of the country. It is formed at the confluence of over 30 spring branches emerging from El Tatio area. Flowing briefly south, it turns west and passes through a canyon that it has carved in volcanic rocks.

In its middle course, the river receives the Toconce River (originated at the foot of Linzor volcano) from the north and the Caspana River from the south. In this area, a part of the flow of its tributaries is diverted for providing water for domestic consumption in Antofagasta and Tocopilla, amongst other localities.

After joining with the two aforementioned streams, the Salado River enters a floodplain, which is used for pasturage by the inhabitants of the nearby localities, including Toconce, Caspana and Aiquina. Then, the Salado again flows through a narrow canyon, where the so-called Devil's Bridge is found, which is a 5-metre wide gash that the river has cut through rhyolite terrain.

Finally, the Salado empties into the Loa River, the main watercourse of the Chilean Norte Grande, about 3 km south of Chiuchiu.
