= Ayquina =

Coordinates: 22°16′45″S 68°19′19″W

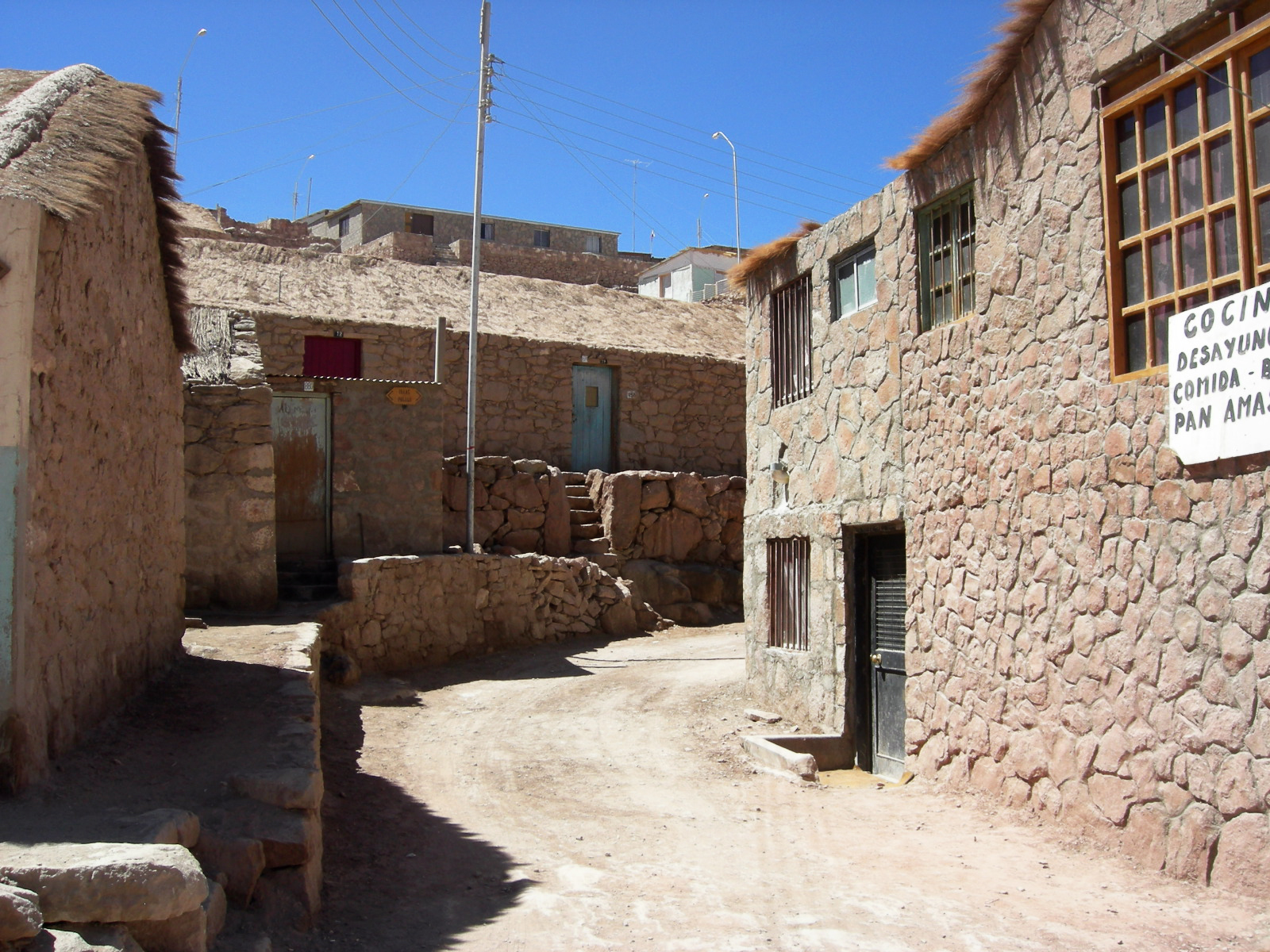
A typical street in the village of Ayquina

Ayquina (also spelled as Aiquina) is a village located on the northern flank of Salado River Canyon in the Calama commune of the El Loa Province in Chile's Antofagasta Region. It sits at an elevation of 2,980 m (9,777 ft) above sea level. The festival of Our Lady of Guadalupe of Ayquina is the most important religious festival in the area.

Cerro Paniri, a stratovolcano, plays an important role in the local culture and beliefs. On September 1, 1998, the city, along with Toconce, was added to the UNESCO World Heritage Tentative List for its universal cultural importance.

Much of the village's architecture has a pre-Columbian flavor, which is given by its thatched roofs and walls of limestone rubble.

There are agricultural terraces close to the village, which are located along the Salado River Canyon and cover an area of approximately 0.1 km^{2} (0.039 sq mi).
