= Conchi viaduct =

Bridge in El Loa province, Chile

Conchi Viaduct Viaducto de Conchi
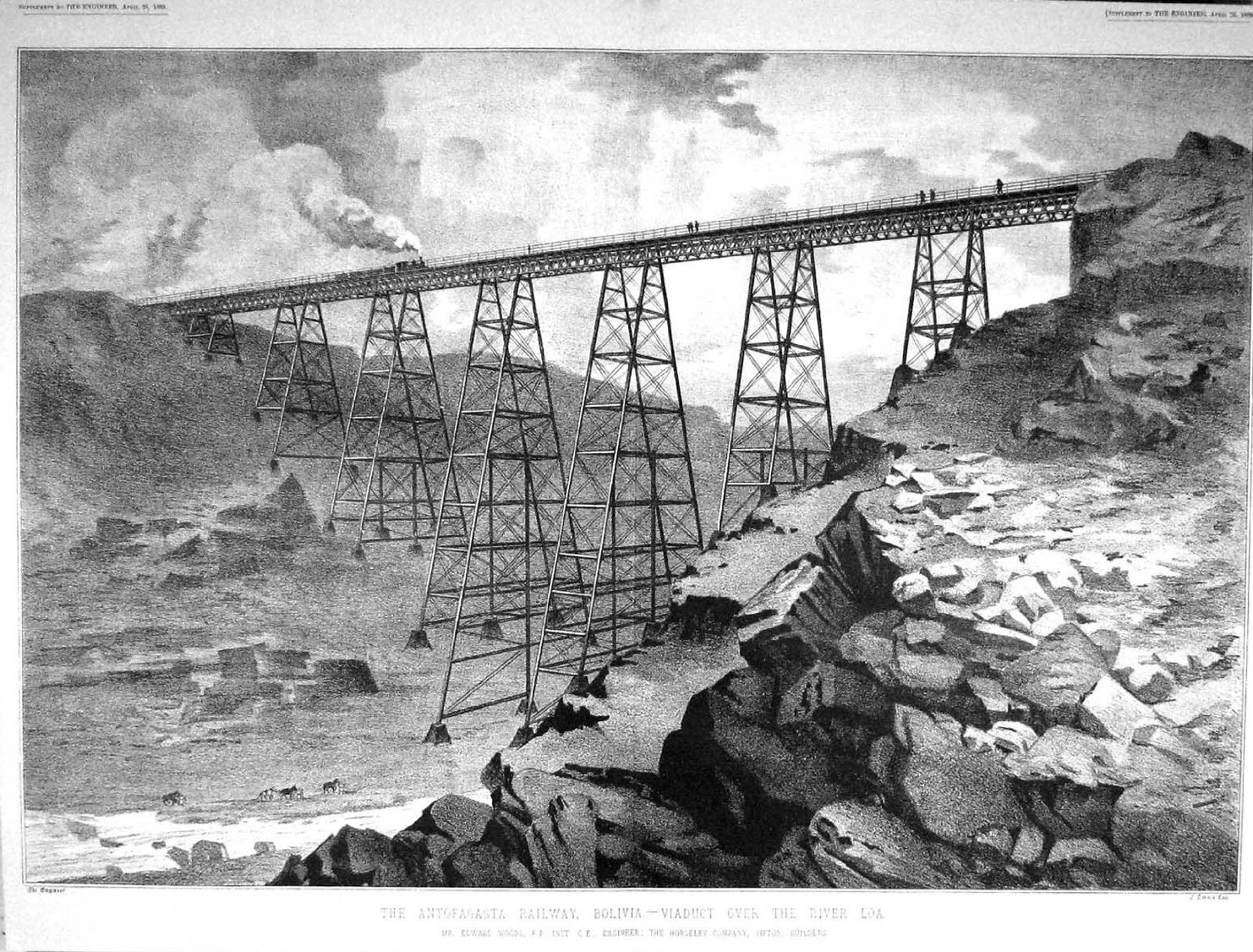
- Coordinates: 22°01′56″S 68°37′15″W
- Carries: pipes, road
- Crosses: Rio Loa
- Locale: El Loa province, Antofagasta region

Characteristics
- Design: Trestle bridge
- Material: Steel
- Total length: 244 metres (801 ft)
- Height: 102 m (335 ft)

History
- Engineering design by: Edward Woods
- Construction start: 1886
- Construction end: 1888

National Monument of Chile
- Designated: 29 May 2015

The Conchi viaduct, or Loa viaduct, is located on the Loa River in Chile, 68 kilometres (42 mi) from Calama. It was built to carry part of the Ferrocarril de Antofagasta a Bolivia (Antofagasta & Bolivia Railway). It stands 103 metres (338 ft) above the river and is 244 metres (801 ft) long. When opened in 1888, it was the second highest rail bridge in the world, after the Garabit viaduct.

In 1914, the railway was realigned. Today, the bridge carries only pipes and a cordoned-off road.

On June 3, 2015, it was declared a National Monument, in the category of Historical Monument, by Decree 156 of the Ministry of Education, published in the Chilean Official Journal.
