= San Salvador River =

San Salvador River may refer to:

- San Salvador River (Chile)
- San Salvador River (Uruguay)
