= Lasana =

Village in Chile

Coordinates: 22°16′15″S 68°37′57″W

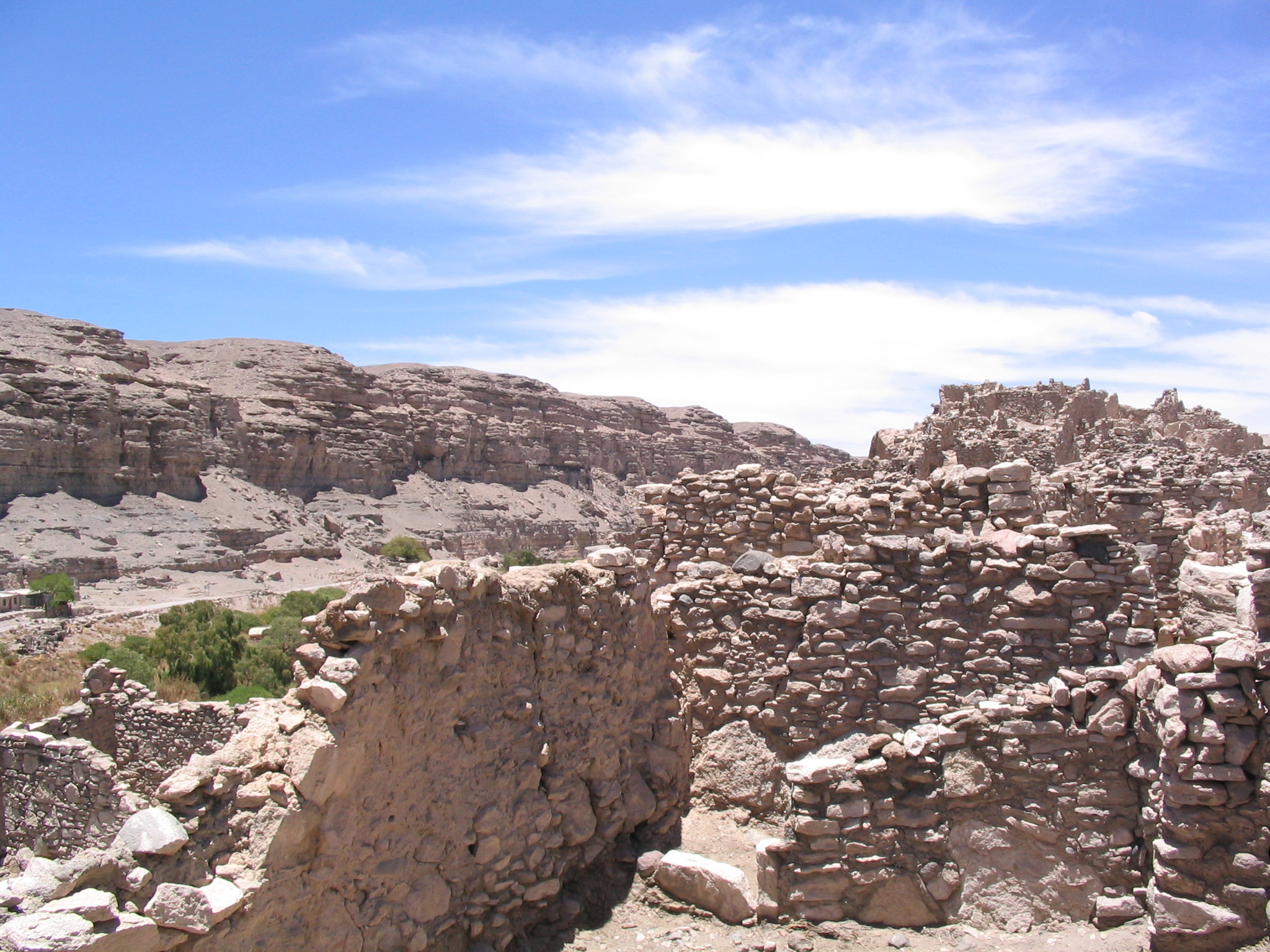
Pukará de Lasana

Lasana is a small village located 40 km (25 mi) northeast of the city of Calama in the Calama province of Chile's northern Antofagasta Region. It sits along the banks of the Loa River.

Pukará de Lasana, (Quechua pukara fortress), a pre-Columbian fortress built in the 12th century, is the main architectural attraction of the village. It is located 8 km (5 mi) north of San Francisco de Chiu Chiu and was declared a national monument in 1982.

Petroglyphs can also be found in the area.
