= Loa River =

- Map

Location
- Country: Chile

Physical characteristics
- Source
  - location: Miño Volcano
  - coordinates: 21°7′10″S 68°37′5″W
  - elevation: 4,277 m (14,032 ft)
- Mouth
  - location: Pacific Ocean
  - coordinates: 21°25′48″S 70°3′27″W
  - elevation: Sea level
- Length: 440 km (270 mi)
- Basin size: 33,570 km^{2} (12,960 sq mi)
- Discharge
  - average: 2.43 m^{3}/s (86 cu ft/s)

Basin features
- Tributaries
  - left: San Pedro de Inacaliri River; Salado River
  - right: San Salvador River

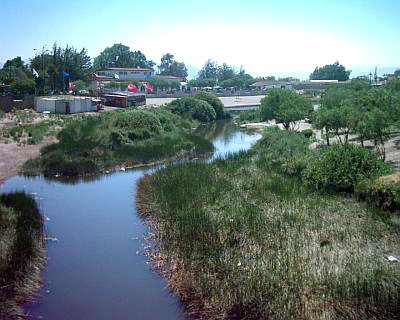
Loa River in Calama

The Loa River (Spanish: Río Loa) is a U-shaped river in Chile's northern Antofagasta Region. At 440 km (270 mi) long, it is the country's longest river and the main watercourse in the Atacama Desert.

== Course ==
The Loa's sources are located on Andean mountain slopes at the foot of Miño Volcano. The upper Loa basin is flanked on the west by a ridge with elevations that reach above 4,500 m (14,800 ft), whereas to the east lies a volcanic chain (including Aucanquilcha, Palpana and San Pedro), which separates it from endorheic basins as that of Salar de Ascotán.

The river flows south on an elevated plateau from 4,000 m (13,000 ft) to 2,500 m (8,200 ft) altitude, part of the Alto Loa National Reserve, for about 150 km (90 mi), to the oasis of Chiu Chiu. The upper courses of the river are at a considerable elevation above sea level and receive water from the Andes, mainly of two major tributaries: San Pedro de Inacaliri River and Salado River. The former joins the Loa near Conchi dam and reservoir and the latter about 3 km (2 mi) south of Chiu Chiu. The water of its upper course and tributaries is fresh. However the lower course (as in all the rivers of this region) becomes brackish.

From Chiu Chiu, the Loa flows west and north in a great curve to Quillagua. After flowing west for 115 km (71 mi) in this portion of its course and having run through the city of Calama, the Loa receives the waters of San Salvador River at the locality of Chacance. Thence the river flows north for about 80 km (50 mi) to Quillagua at about 800 m (2,600 ft) altitude. The Sloman dam is on this section.

From Quillagua, its partly dry channel turns westward again and marks the border between the regions of Tarapacá and Antofagasta. Along its lower course, the Loa flows through a 500-metre-deep (1,600 ft) canyon, which crosses the Chilean Coastal Range. The river reaches the Pacific Ocean in lat. 21° 26' S., a few miles south of the old port of Huanillos.

The hydrologic regime of the river basin is rain-dominated. The increase of its water volume occurs mainly in January and February, as a consequence of the phenomenon known locally as Bolivian Winter.

== History ==
Its banks have been inhabited from early times. Evidence of this is the notable number of geoglyphs, petroglyphs and pictographs that are found along its course and in its upper basin.

Another indication of its rich past is the Pukará de Lasana.

== Bridges ==
To the south of Conchi reservoir, the river is spanned by the Conchi Viaduct, an old railroad bridge. It is no longer used by the Ferrocarril de Antofagasta a Bolivia, however it still holds the notability of being, at 104 m (341 ft), one of the highest bridges in Chile.

== Needs ==
This river supplies many towns with water used to raise shrimp. Lately, mining companies have been polluting this river, making the water unusable.
