= Rufino Carrasco =

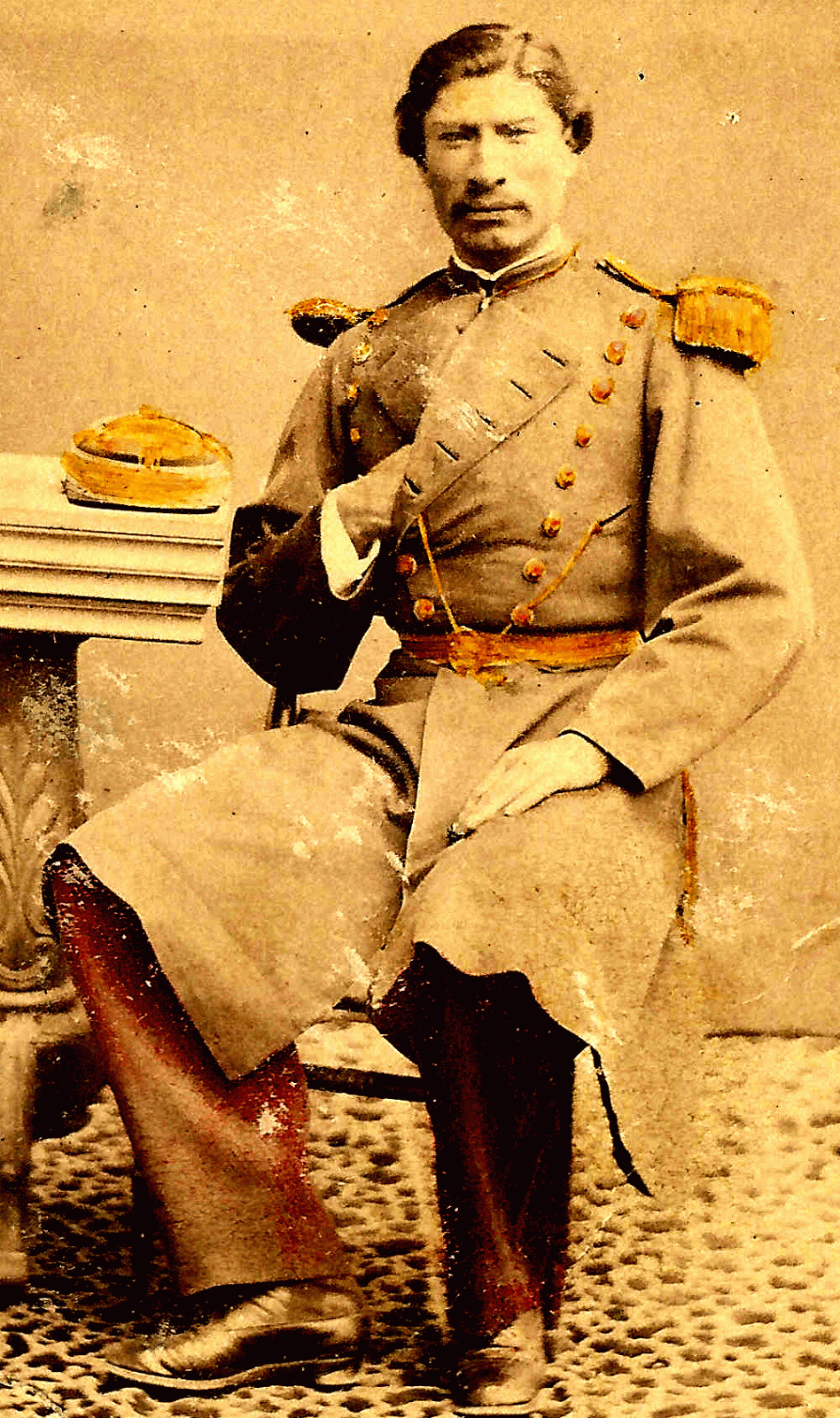
- Born: July 10, 1817; Talina, Potosí Department, Bolivia
- Died: 1891 (aged 73–74)
- Military career
- Allegiance: Bolivia
- Branch: Bolivian Army
- Service years: 1829 — 1883
- Rank: Lieutenant Colonel
- Conflicts: Peruvian-Bolivian War of 1841-1842: Battle of Ingavi; War of the Pacific: Battle of Tambillo

Rufino Carrasco (1817-1891) was a Bolivian Lieutenant Colonel who was notable for his service at the Battle of Tambillo of the War of the Pacific.

== Biography ==
Rufino was born as the son of Manuel Carrasco, sergeant major of the Guides Squadron, he joined the Bolivian Army at a young age, during the Government of Marshal Andrés de Santa Cruz. He participated in the conflicts of Humahuaca, Iruya, Montenegro and in the famous Battle of Ingavi. In February 1875 he was appointed Chief of the General Staff of Cochabamba. Subsequently, the National Senate, on the proposal of the Executive and Legislative Resolution of November 1, 1888, amounted to Rufino Carrasco to the degree of brigadier general of the Bolivian Army.

Currently, his remains were found in the cemetery of Oruro.

== Battle of Tambillo ==
Carrasco's participation in the contest between Peru and Bolivia against Chile is little known. However, it is known that thanks to him Bolivia won one of the few battles against the Chilean Army.

On December 6, 1879, 70 chicheños snipers defeated 24 Chileans in the Tambillo gorge. The Chilean troops were preparing to enter Oruro and Potosí to cut supplies from Sucre.

After the defeat, which left 9 dead and 11 wounded in the Grenadiers of Chile; Carrasco's men obtained 11 prisoners and a booty of 18 Winchester rifles, 14 swords, 16 beasts, and countless mounts, belts, and ammunition.

Carrasco's bravery, which was overshadowed despite his victory at Tambillo, is opposed to the performance of Narciso Campero. Campero was at the head of the Bolivian Fifth Division, of which Rufino was a colonel. After the Battle Tambillo was won, Carrasco raised the Bolivian flag in Atacama and waited for reinforcements that never arrived:

It is extremely strange to me that General (Narciso) Campero (...) after entrusting me with such a difficult expedition, launching me with only 70 men until I was within eight leagues where considerable enemy forces are, have not sent forces to support us. We, resolved to sacrifice ourselves for the homeland, we do not omit any means of doing so, but for any failure that may arise in the future, you and only you will be responsible to the Bolivian people, "wrote the colonel, in a letter sent to the Headquarters of the State. Bolivian major.

Those were the words of Carrasco, who ended up vacating Atacama due to the lack of reinforcements.

A year later, in 1880, Rufino Carrasco published a Manifesto on the expedition of the Bolivian coast, in which he gives an account of his participation in the conflict. This document was published in 2016, in a facsimile edition, by the Ministry of Defense of the Plurinational State of Bolivia.
