= Toconce =

Coordinates: 22°15′52″S 68°09′58″W

Toconce

Toconce is a small Chilean village located on the south rim of the Toconce River Canyon at 3,350 m above sea level. To the north, the landscape is dominated by the volcanoes Cerro Paniri, Cerro del León and Toconce.

== See also ==
- Ayquina
- Caspana
- Salado River
