= San Salvador River (Chile) =

Coordinates: 22°23′47″S 69°31′39″W

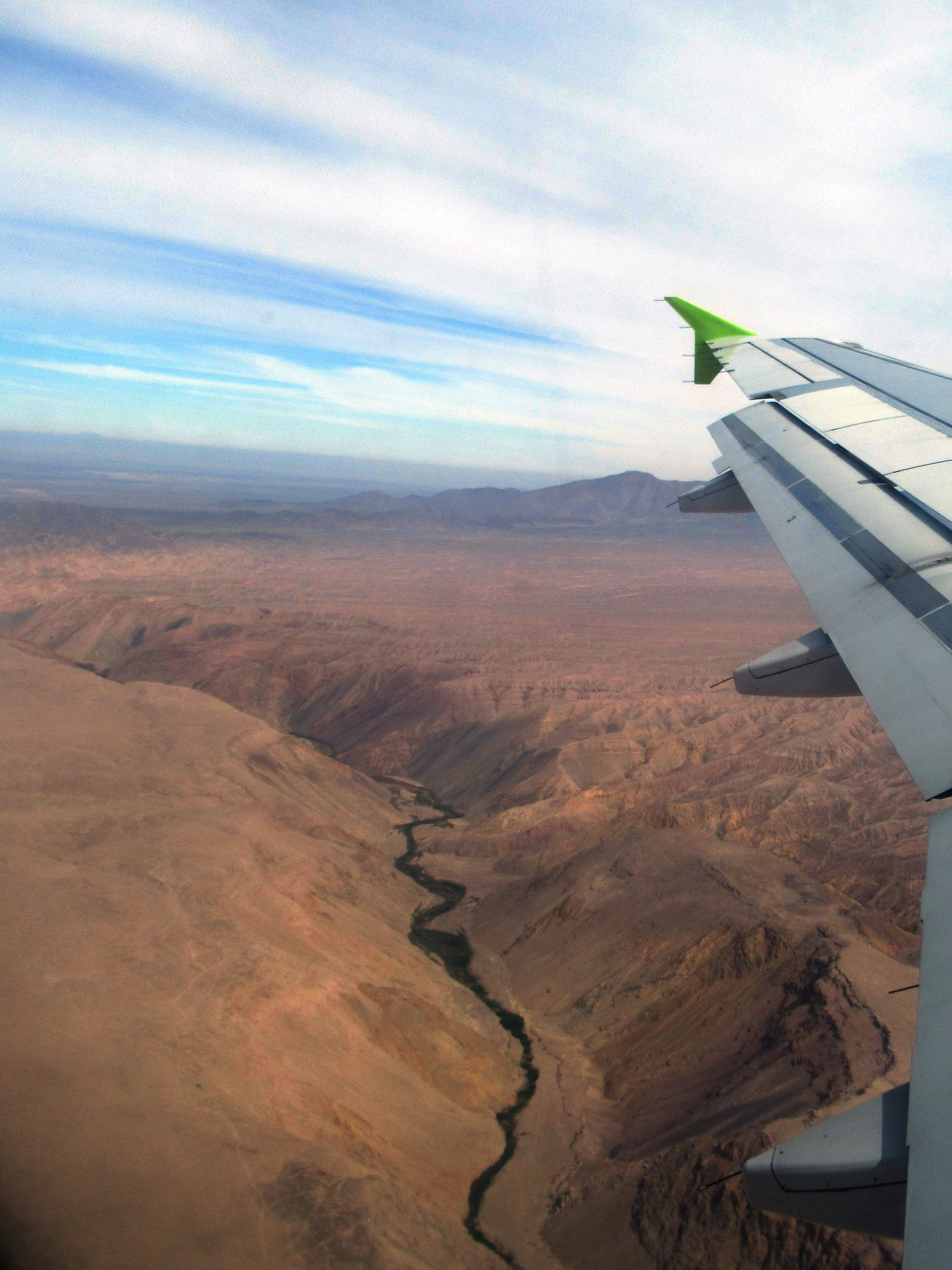

Location
- Country: Chile

The San Salvador River is a river of Chile.

== See also ==
- List of rivers of Chile
