= Antofagasta Region =

Region of Chile

Antofagasta Region Región de Antofagasta
- Region
- Flag Seal Coat of arms

- Map of Antofagasta Region
- Coordinates: 23°38′49″S 70°23′54″W
- Country: Chile
- Capital: Antofagasta
- Provinces: Tocopilla, El Loa, Antofagasta

Government
  - Intendant: Marco Antonio Díaz (RN)

Area
  - Total: 126,049.1 km^{2} (48,667.8 sq mi)
  - Rank: 2
- Highest elevation: 6,723 m (22,057 ft)
- Lowest elevation: 0 m (0 ft)

Population (2024 census)
  - Total: 635,416
  - Rank: 9
  - Density: 5.04102/km^{2} (13.0562/sq mi)

GDP (PPP)
  - Total: $38.886 billion (2014)
  - Per capita: $63,402 (2014)
- ISO 3166 code: CL-AN
- HDI (2022): 0.881 very high
- Website: Official website (in Spanish)

The Antofagasta Region (Spanish: Región de Antofagasta, pronounced [antofaˈɣasta]) is one of Chile's sixteen first-order administrative divisions. Being the second-largest region of Chile in area, it comprises three provinces, Antofagasta, El Loa and Tocopilla. It is bordered to the north by Tarapacá, by Atacama to the south, and to the east by Bolivia and Argentina. The region's capital is the port city of Antofagasta; another one of its important cities is Calama. The region's main economic activity is copper mining in its giant inland porphyry copper systems.

Antofagasta's climate is extremely arid, albeit somewhat milder near the coast. Nearly all of the region is devoid of vegetation, except close to the Loa River and at oases such as San Pedro de Atacama. Much of the inland is covered by salt flats, tephra and lava flows, and the coast exhibits prominent cliffs.

The region was sparsely populated by indigenous Changos and Atacameños until massive Chilean immigration in conjunction with a saltpeter boom in the later 19th century. Most of the region was Bolivia's only coastal territory until being annexed by Chile in 1879, at the onset of the War of the Pacific.

== History ==
Antofagasta's history is divided, as the territory itself, into two sections: the coastal region, and the highlands plateau or altiplano around the Andes. In pre-Columbian times, the coastline was populated by nomadic fishing clans of Changos Indians, of which very little is known due to very limited contact with the Spanish conquerors.

The inland section was populated by the Atacaman culture around the great dry salt lake Salar de Atacama, the Loa River basin, and valleys and oases across the altiplano, with the most important settlement being the village of San Pedro de Atacama.

The Atacaman culture was deeply influenced by Tiwanaku culture and later fell under Inca rule. The Atacamans harvested mainly corn and beans and developed trade as far as the Amazon basin and Pacific shores. The arrival of the Spaniards in the 16th century did not destroy the culture but transformed it deeply through the process of mestizaje, in which both cultures mixed. Under Spanish rule, Atacaman territory was placed under the administration of the Audiencia Real de Charcas, though it is disputed whether the Audiencia Real de Charcas was to administer only the inland portion or the coast as well. At the time of independence general Simón Bolívar integrated it into the new Republic of Bolivia, under the name of "Litoral Department". This decision was disputed by the Chilean Government and has been a source of conflict until present times. Chile claimed that according to the Uti possidetis of the Spanish crown, the coastal region belong to them and their territory bordered directly with Peru.

Chilean explorers such as Juan López and José Santos Ossa discovered rich nitrate and guano deposits which produced a massive Chilean colonization of the coastline. Friction between the new settlers from both countries grew until 1879 when the War of the Pacific erupted. Antofagasta was permanently annexed by the Chilean government at the end of the war.

Colonization by Chileans followed mainly from Norte Chico (the contemporary regions of Atacama and Coquimbo, also known as the III and IV regions), into the new territories of Antofagasta and Tarapacá, known as Norte Grande.

In the early 20th century, the region became a significant base of Chile's union-organizing movements. It continued to depend economically on the nitrate-extraction industry until its replacement by copper mining. Two of the largest and richest open pit mines in the world are located inland from Antofagasta: La Escondida and Chuquicamata.

== Administration ==
Each province in the region is further subdivided into communes.

Province	Capital	Communes	Other towns
Antofagasta	Antofagasta	Antofagasta	
Antofagasta	Antofagasta	Mejillones	Hornitos
Antofagasta	Antofagasta	Sierra Gorda	
Antofagasta	Antofagasta	Taltal	
El Loa	Calama	Calama	Ayquina; Caspana; Lasana; San Francisco de Chiu Chiu; Toconce
El Loa	Calama	Ollagüe	
El Loa	Calama	San Pedro de Atacama	Socaire; Toconao
Tocopilla	Tocopilla	Tocopilla	
Tocopilla	Tocopilla	María Elena	

== Geography ==
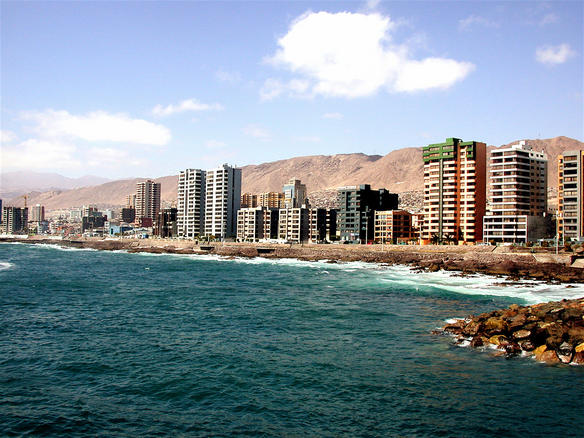
The city of Antofagasta

The main river is the Loa.

Along the Coastal Cordillera lies Atacama Fault. The area of the Coastal Cordillera around the fault is rich in iron ore constituting the northern part of the so-called Chilean Iron Belt. These ore deposits are often of the manto-type deposits and are chiefly emplaced on rocks of La Negra Formation.

=== Climate ===
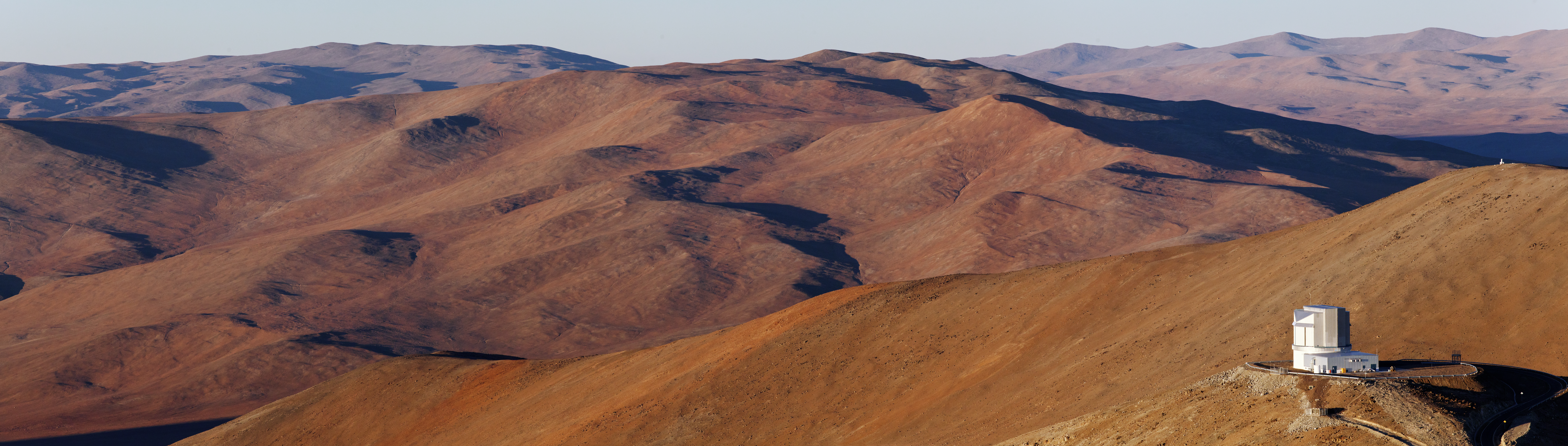
Atacama Desert, vista before sunset

The average rainfall in the Antofagasta is just 1 millimetre (0.04 in) per year. From the coast, east to the Chilean Coast Range, is the south-central part of the Atacama Desert, the driest desert in the world. Further to the east, it is part of the less arid Central Andean dry puna ecoregion. The surroundings of abandoned Yungay town have been named the driest place in the world.

== Demography ==
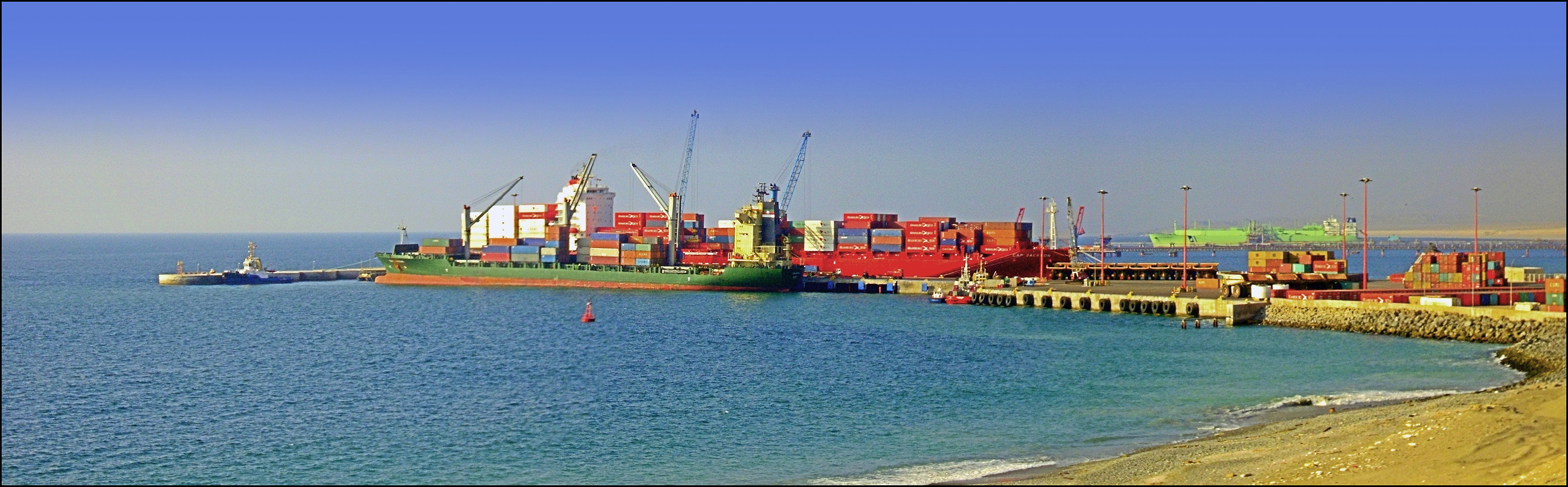
Overview of the Port Angamos at evening (Mejillones)

Most of the population lives on the coast in Antofagasta and Mejillones, or in Calama in the interior, the hub of the mining industry and the home of a large part of its work force.

In the late 19th and early 20th centuries, immigrant settlers also arrived from Europe (mainly Croatians, Italians, Spaniards, Greeks, English, French, German, and Portuguese peoples), from the Levant, and in smaller numbers from China, Japan, Korea, Peru and Bolivia. Various immigration flows joined with the culture of the altiplano region creating the modern culture of the north of Chile, which arguably presents more Andean- and multi-European-features than the Central Valley and mainstream Chilean culture.

== Economy ==
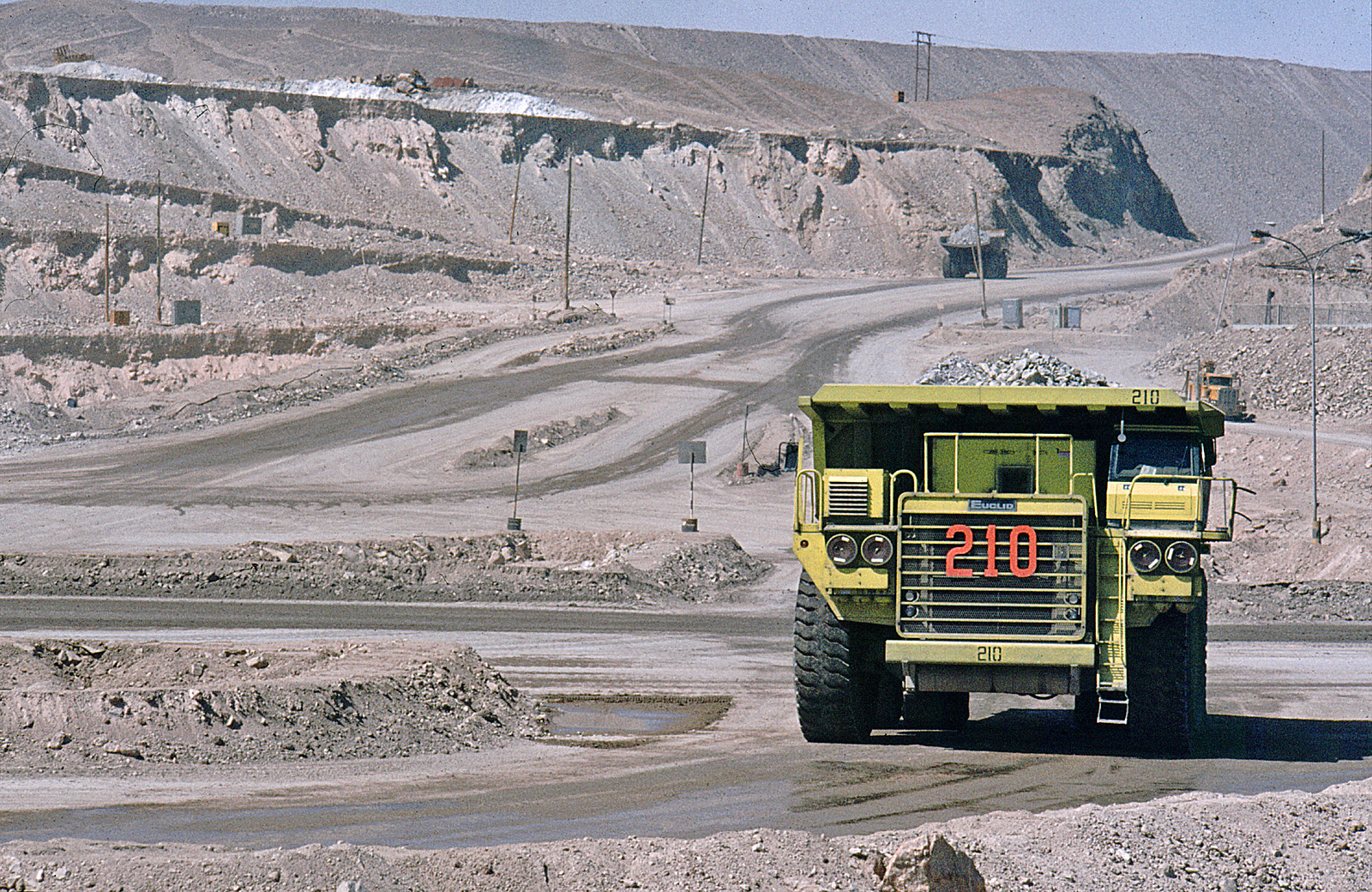
Copper mining is the main economic generator in the region.

Mines in Antofagasta Region that rank among Chile's five most productive copper or gold mines.

The Antofagasta Region is the heart of the mining industry, Chile's main source of export revenue. It represents 53% of Chile's mining output, led by copper and followed by potassium nitrate, gold, iodine, and lithium, which means it could have had GDP per capita higher than Luxembourg had it had a large degree of autonomy. The mining industry regularly accounts for more than 90% of the region's exports. In 2024 mining stood for 69% of the region's GDP.

Fishing and manufacturing also contribute to the income of the area.

The availability of infrastructure and services, due to the region's mining boom, together with its abundance of beautiful natural scenery, have opened vast prospects for the travel industry, both in the interior and on the coast. Interesting tourist attractions include the small town of San Pedro de Atacama, once the center of the Atacameño culture, Atacama Salt Flat, the Valley of the Moon, the Quitor Pukará, the Puritama hot springs and the numerous astronomical observatories including the Very Large Telescope and ALMA.

== See also ==
- 2007 Tocopilla earthquake
- Atacama border dispute
- Ferrocarril de Antofagasta a Bolivia
- War of the Pacific
- Norte Grande, natural region of Chile
