= Caspana =

Village in Chile

Coordinates: 22°19′51″S 68°12′48″W

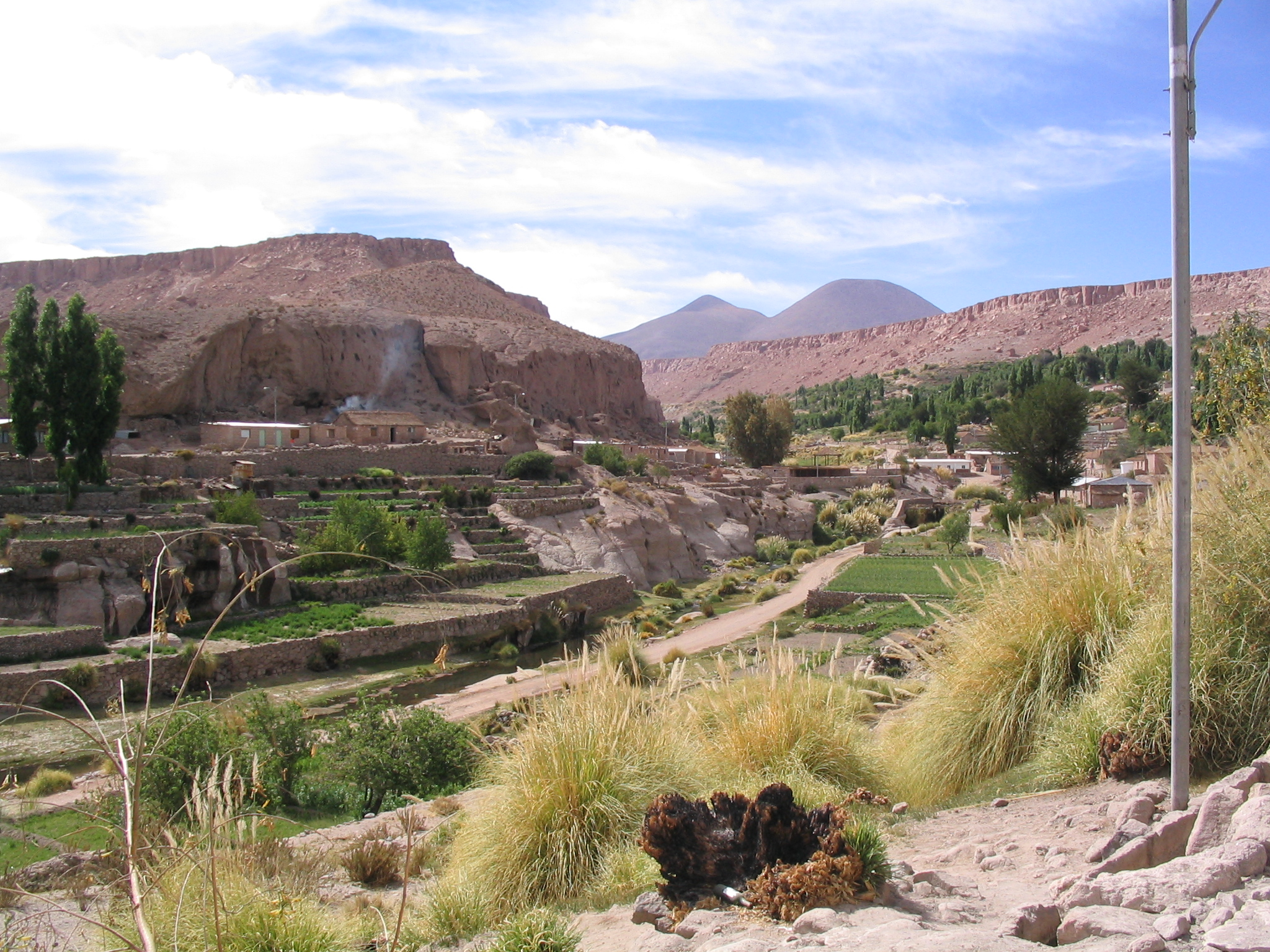

Caspana is a Chilean village located 85 km northeast of the city of Calama, in the gorge carved by the river that shared its name and that is a tributary of the Salado River. Agricultural terraces form part of the landscape of the area. Its church dates from the 17th century.
