= San Francisco de Chiu Chiu =

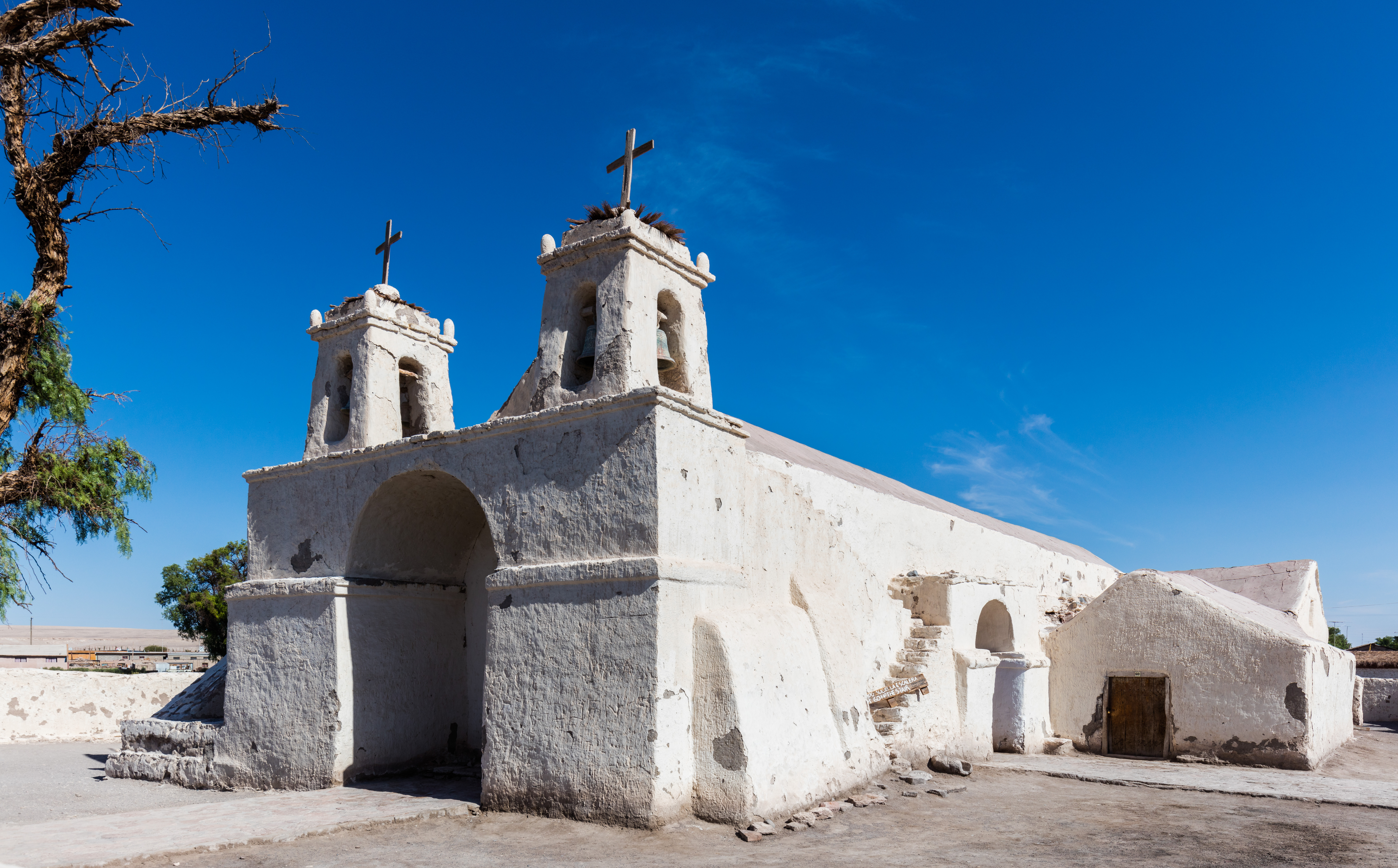
Church of San Francisco.

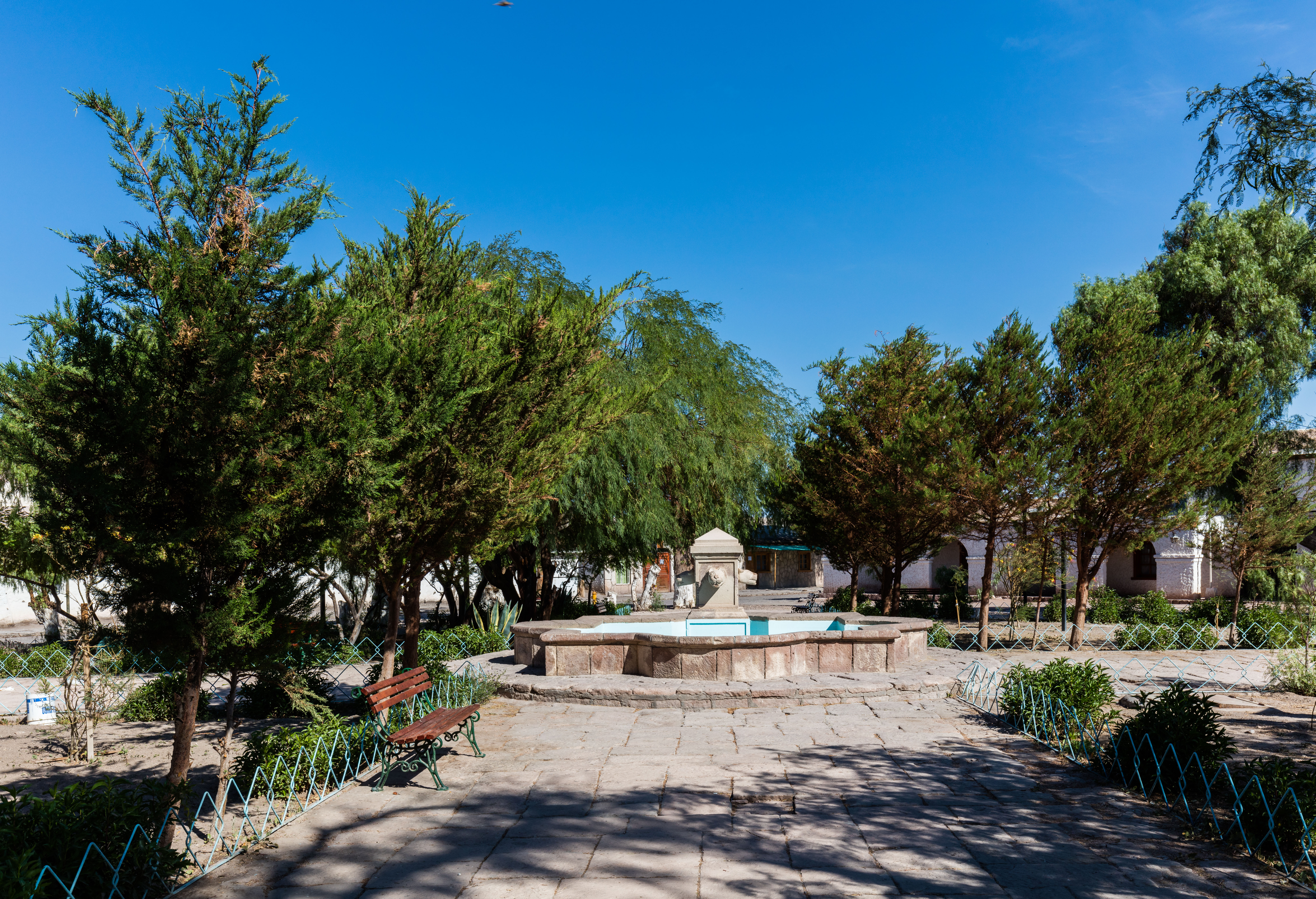
Main square.

San Francisco de Chiu Chiu, or simply Chiu Chiu, is a village located about 30 km (19 mi) northeast of the city of Calama, in El Loa Province of Chile's northern Antofagasta Region. It lies at an elevation of 2,525 m (8,284 ft) above sea level, close to the confluence of the Loa and Salado rivers.

San Francisco de Chiu Chiu Church, built in the 17th century, is the main attraction in the village.
