= Calama, Chile =

Calama
- City and Commune
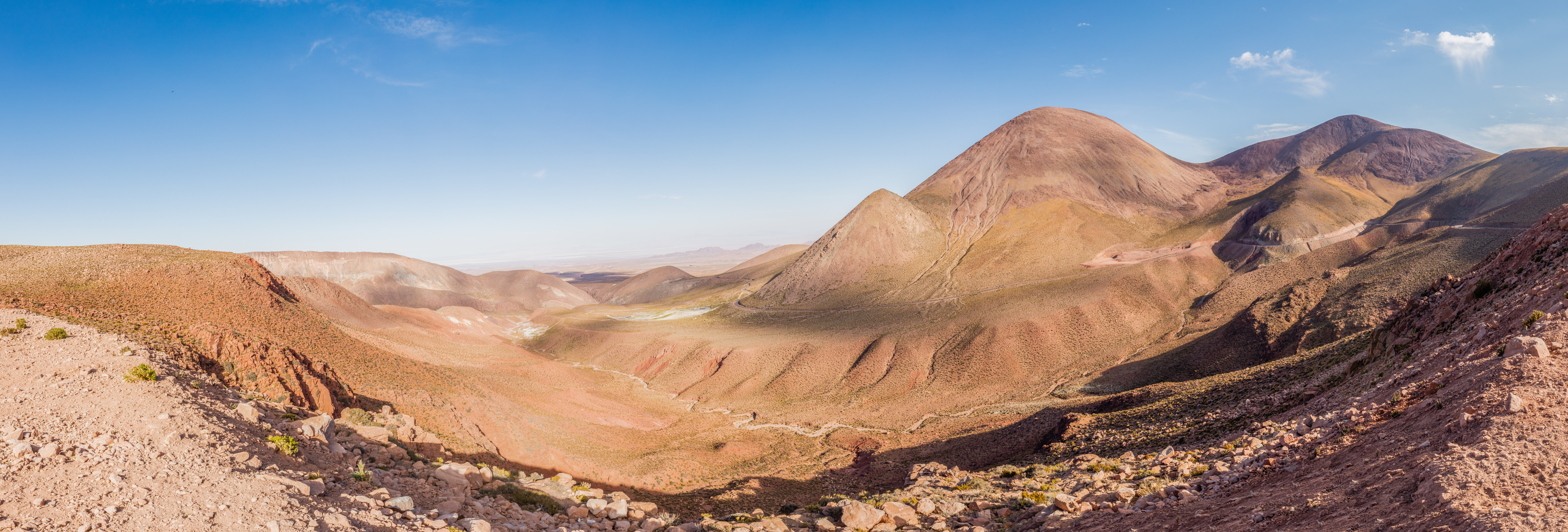
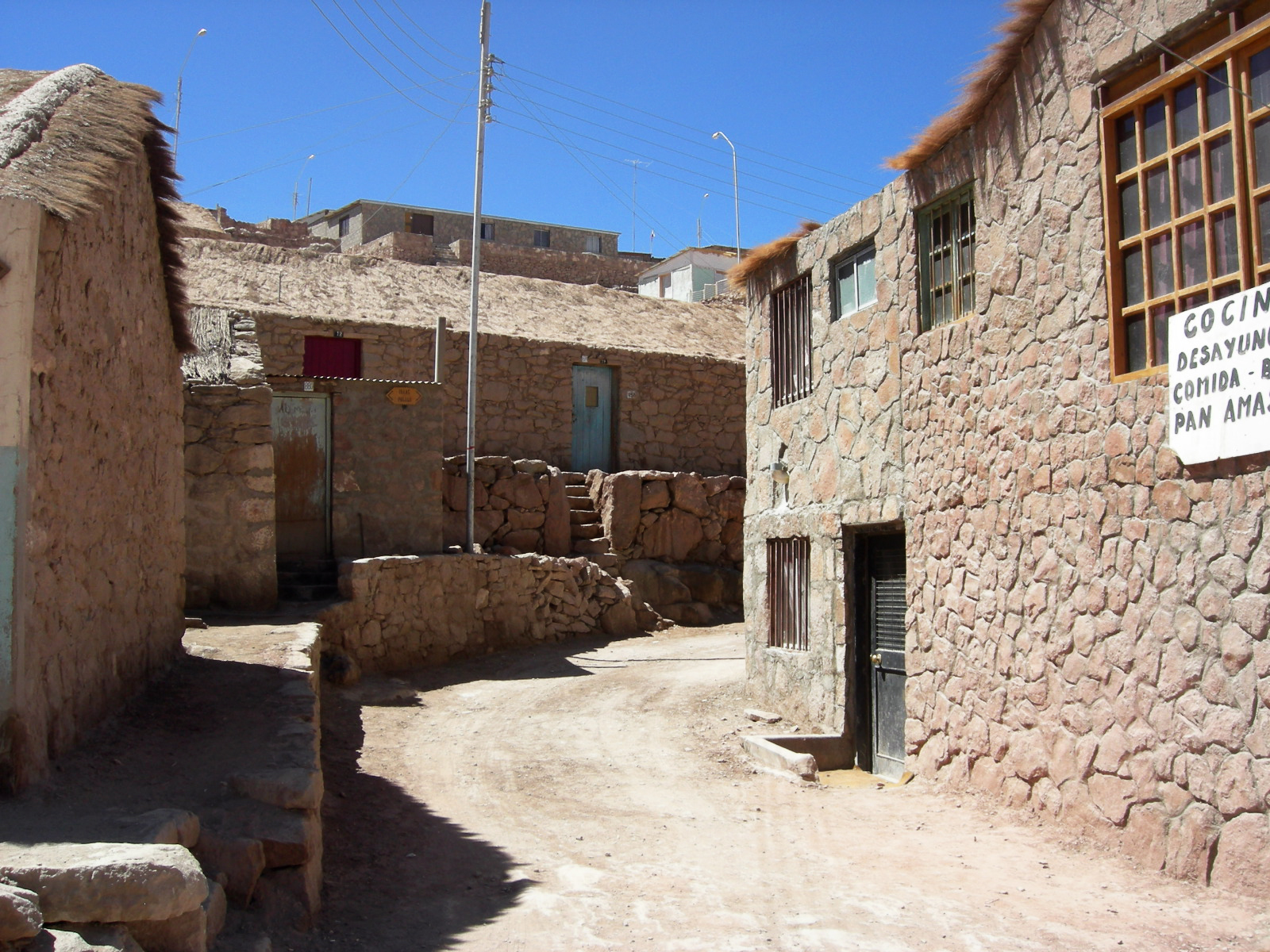
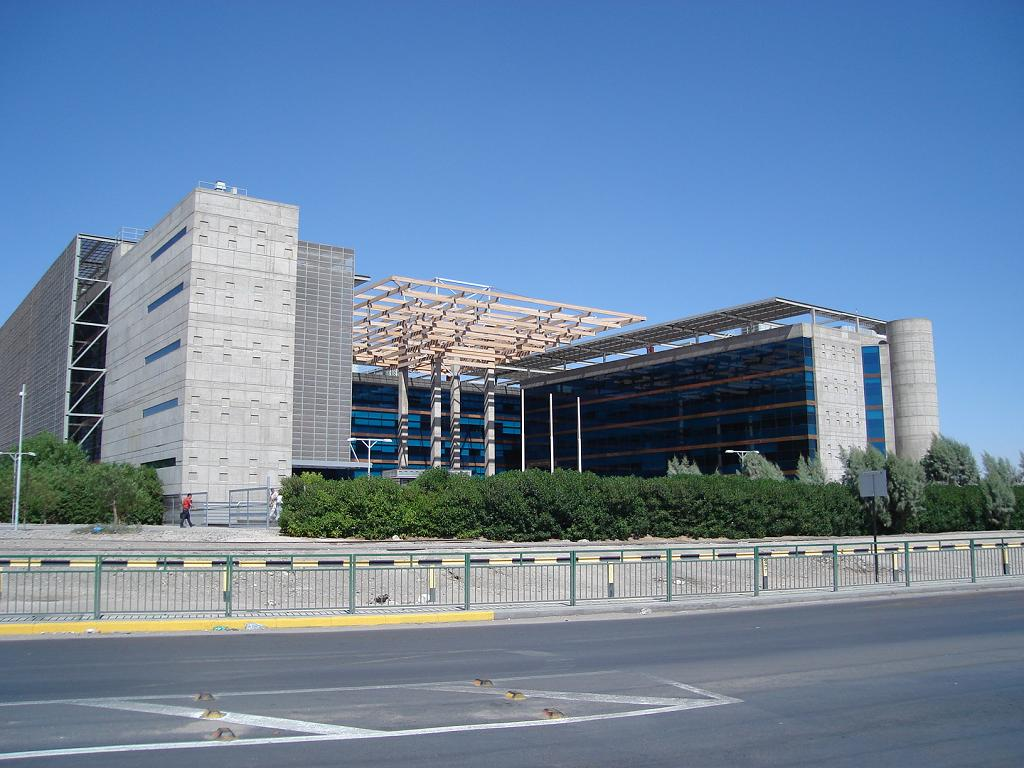
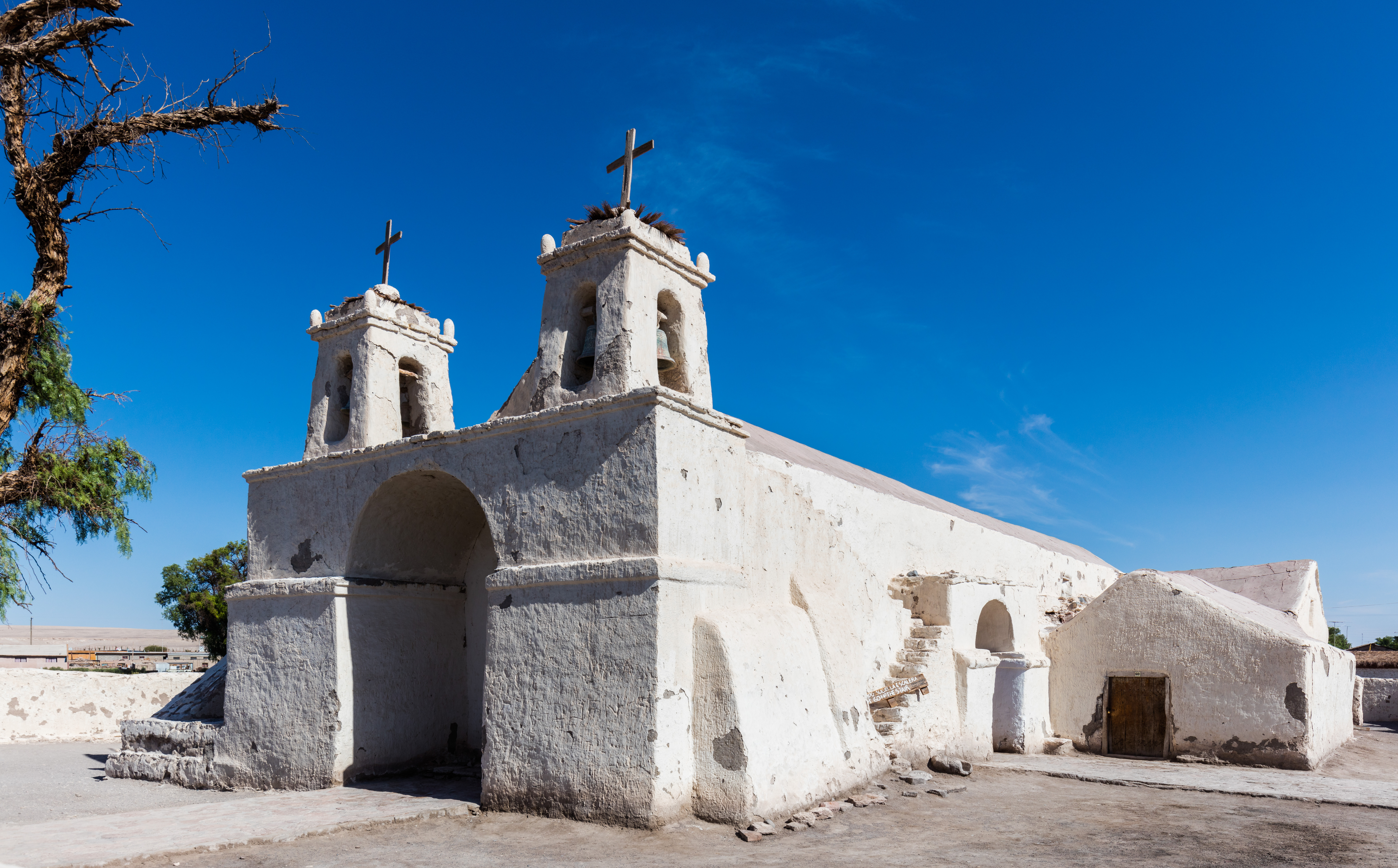
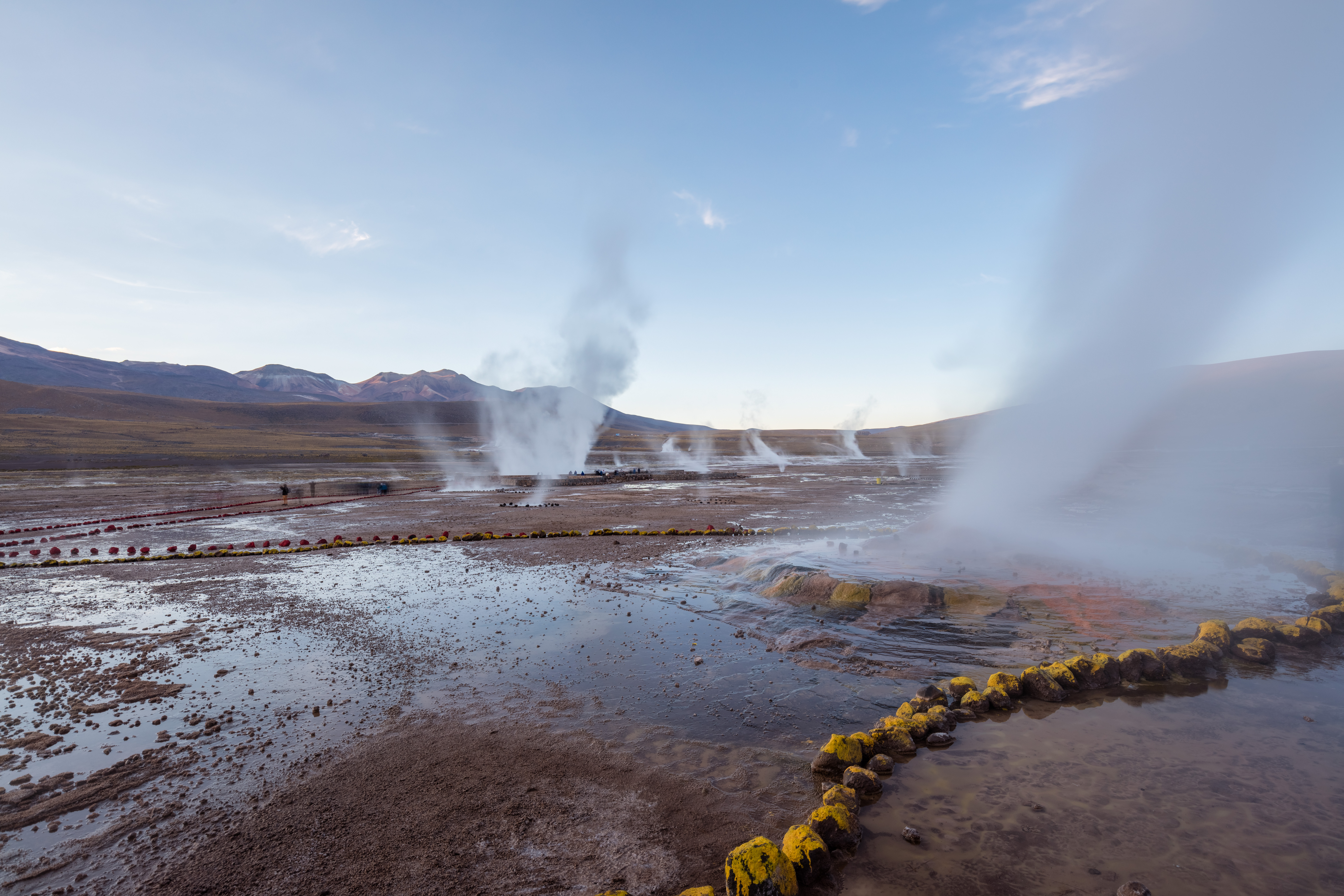
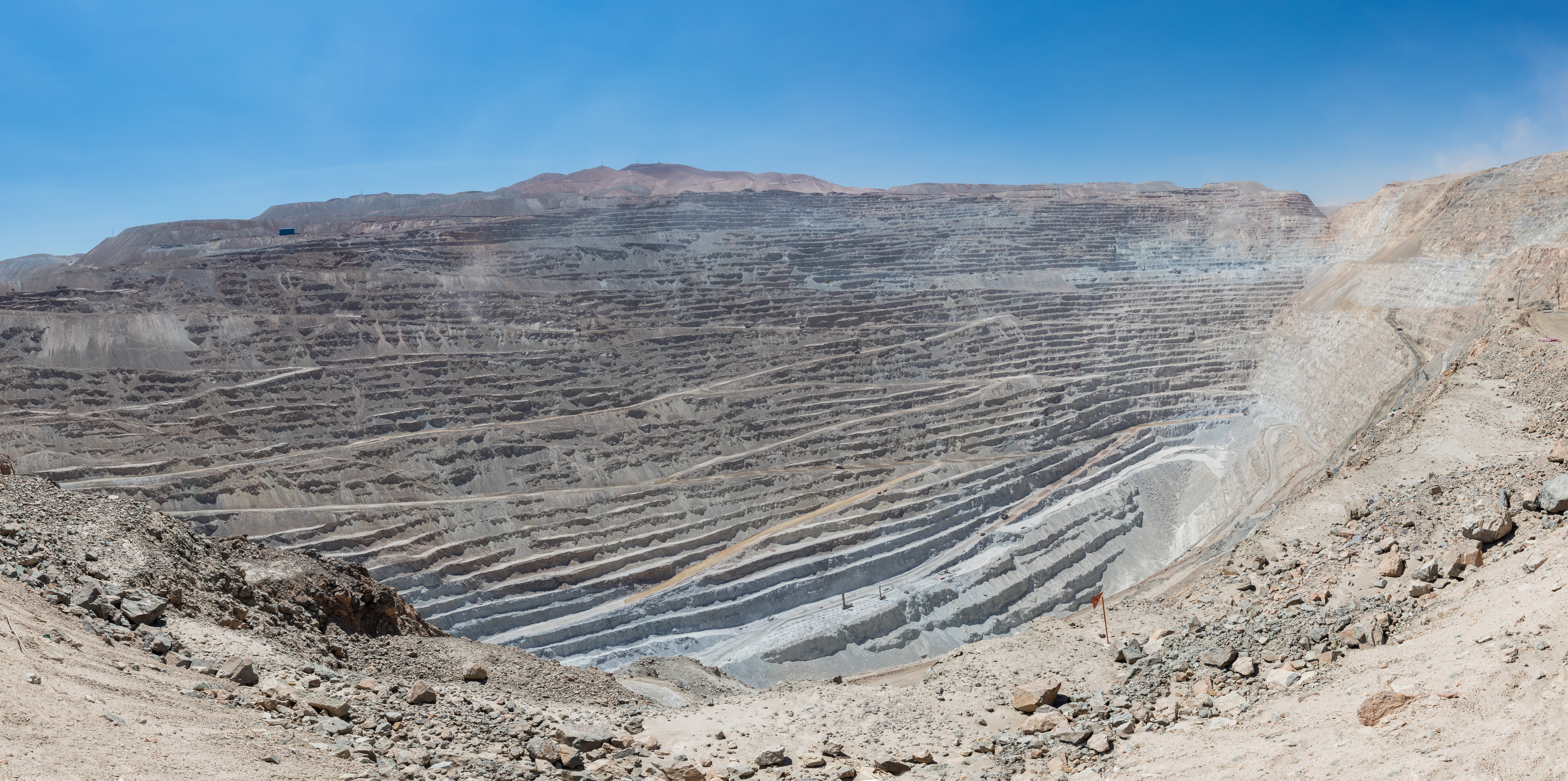
- From left to right: Norte Grande, Historical town of Ayquina, Codelco corporate building, Church of San Francisco de Chiu Chiu, El Tatio and Chuquicamata

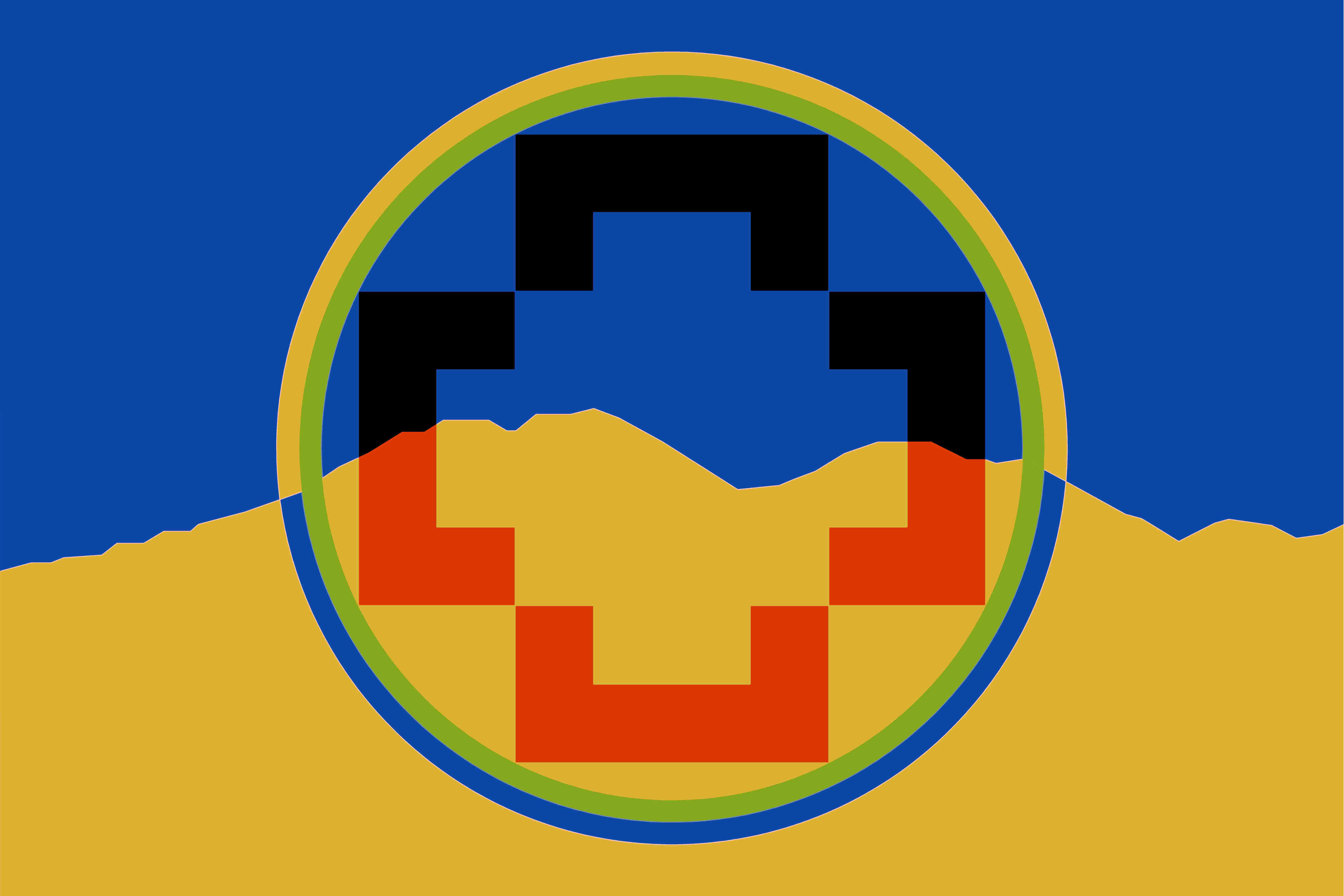
- Flag Coat of arms Map of the Calama commune in Antofagasta Region Location in Chile
- Coordinates (city): 22°28′S 68°56′W
- Country: Chile
- Region: Antofagasta
- Province: El Loa

Government
  - Type: Municipality
  - Alcalde: Daniel Agusto Pérez

Area
  - Total: 15,596.9 km^{2} (6,022.0 sq mi)
- Elevation: 2,260 m (7,410 ft)

Population (2024)
  - Total: 166,334
  - Density: 10.6646/km^{2} (27.6211/sq mi)
- Demonym: Calamenian
- Time zone: UTC−4 (CLT)
  - Summer (DST): UTC−3 (CLST)
- Postal code: 1399001
- Climate: BWk
- Website: Official website (in Spanish)

Calama is a city and commune in the Atacama Desert in northern Chile. It is the capital of El Loa Province, part of the Antofagasta Region. Calama is one of the driest cities in the world with average annual precipitation of just 5 mm (0.20 in). The River Loa, Chile's longest, flows through the city. With a population of 166,334, it is the 2nd-largest city in the region.

The commune also encompasses the Quechua communities of Estación San Pedro, Toconce and Cupo; and the Lickan-antay communities of Taira, Conchi Viejo, Lasana, San Francisco de Chiu Chiu, Aiquina-Turi, and Caspana.

In 2003 the nearby town of Chuquicamata, once the largest open-pit copper mine in the world, was dismantled citing environmental reasons and encroachment from the mine's expansion. Residents of Chuquicamata then moved to Calama, away from company-owned residences, to find housing on their own.

== Etymology ==
There are a variety of hypotheses about the origin of the name "Calama," but the two main accounts suggest that it comes from the Kunza language, spoken in the past by the Lickan-antay, an ethnic group that resides in the El Loa Province.

Hector Pumarino Soto suggests that "Calama" stems from the Kunza word "Ckara-ama," which means "town in the middle of the water". Until the middle of the 20th century, the urban site of Calama and the surrounding oasis were flanked by the River Loa on two sides, and the fertile plain and swamps on the other sides, giving the location the appearance of an island in the middle of the desert surrounded completely by water.

Emilio Vaïsse, meanwhile, says that Calama comes from the Kunza word "Ckolama," which means "place where partridges abound". This is supposed testimony to the abundance of such a bird, living over everything in the middle of the western swamp sector.

== History ==
=== Prehispanic Era ===
The exact evidence related to the history of Calama does exist, including petroglyphs and the caves of Yalquincha (NE of the city), the chullpas of Topáter (pre-Columbian cemeteries to the east of the city), the Copper Mummy, and other remains in Chuquicamata.

At the intersection of the Camino del Inca (the longitudinal one) and the routes that crossed the coast of the Altiplano, Calama became the main shelter of the Despoblado of Atacama. Their extensive lands for growing corn and alfalfa give testimony of the high capacity to supply food to the troops of Chasquis and to give tribute to the Inca. In fact, when Diego de Almagro, returning from Cusco, passed by the Calama shelter, the natives gave him copper horseshoes, which were made using a mysterious Incan technique used by towns conquered by the Incas. The science of such a technique still has yet to be explained, but the presence of such horseshoes further suggests strong Incan influence in Prehispanic times.

=== Hispanic Era ===
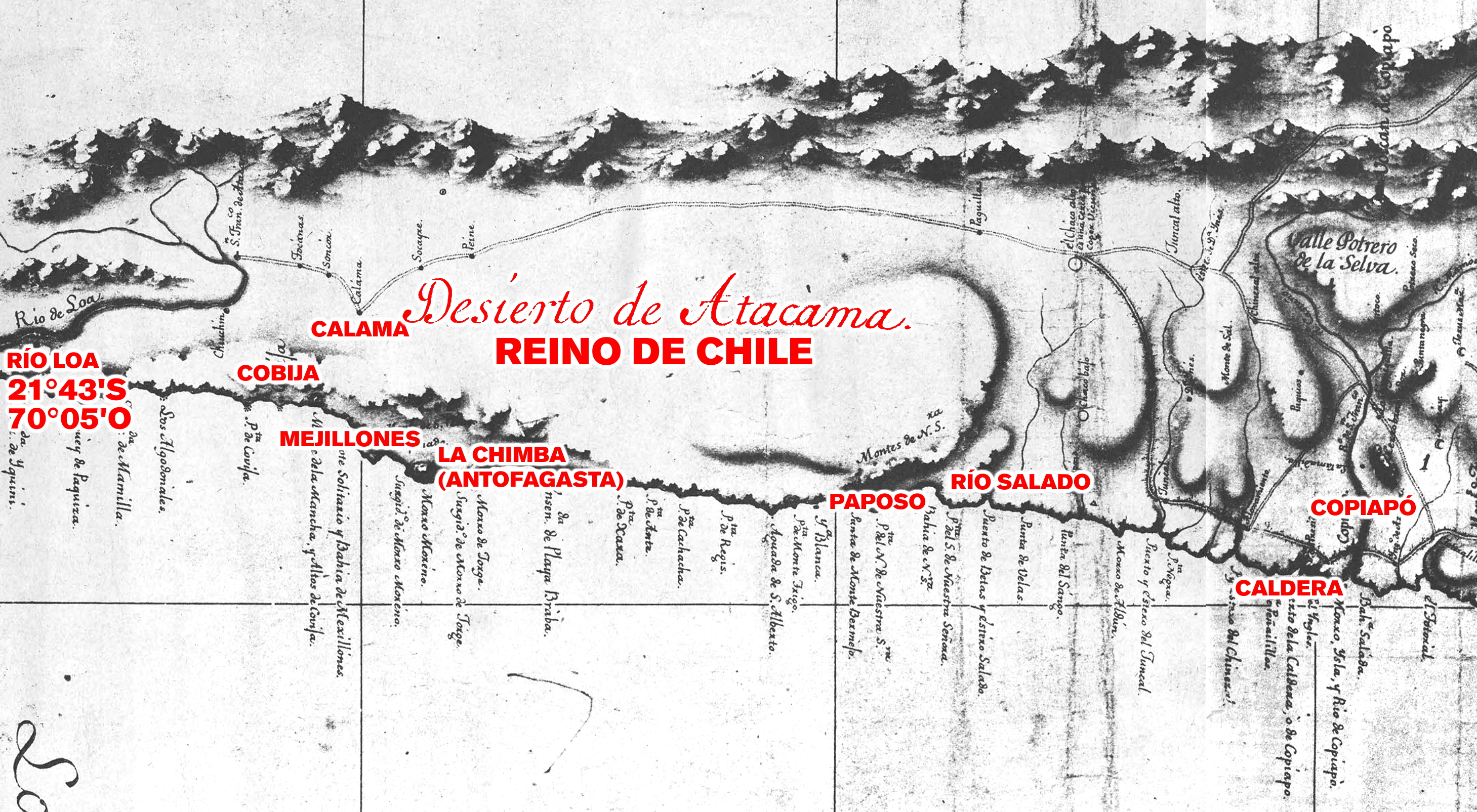
1793 Andrés Baleato's map showing the internal border of Chile and Peru in the Loa River during the Spanish Empire with Calama in the jurisdiciton of Chile.

Spanish colonization obviously caused some changes; however, the hostile climate impeded establishment of greater control. These changes influenced the control of trade routes that crossed the desert and communication to the port of Cobija with the deposits of Potosí silver and the cattle farms of Salta and Tucumán. In this sense, Calama continued as a main point of provision for commercial routes. In the 18th century, with the Bourbon Reforms. Calama was included in maps of the Captaincy General of Chile in the 18th century, depending from the city of Copiapó.

=== Bolivian Era ===
After Bolivia's Declaration of Independence (6 August 1825), and with gradual changes in the administration of the territory, Calama remained constituted under the Departamento de Litoral (1829), subdivided in the Provincia de Lamar y la Provincia de Atacama (Cobija being the departmental capital). Calama was an important town in the Atacama Province, through which traveled the weekly mail between Cobija and Salta-Potosí, since 1832. In 1840, the provincial capital transferred from Chiuchiu to Calama, increasing the communication boom.

The border conflicts between Chile and Bolivia did not reach either Calama or the Atacama Province. The greater dispute concentrated in the central prairie and in the coast, where they began to discover rich silver deposits, saltpeter, and guano. The ambiguity that led to the frontier conflicts was the possession of the central plain and the Atacama coast. The environment was made tense when Chilean troops, under the command of colonel Emilio Sotomayor Baeza, invaded the port of Antofagasta on the morning of February 14, 1879. Later, Bolivia declared war on Chile on March 1.

=== Chilean Era ===
Since that day, the changes in the administration have been very deep. It being part of the administrative center of 2° order in Bolivia, returned as one of 4° order under the Chilean administration (subdelegation). In 1888, under the government of José Manuel Balmaceda, Calama returned as an administrative center of 3° order, inaugurated as the municipality on 13 October. Prior to that, in 1886, Calama was chosen for a railway station of the Antofagasta-Bolivia Railway, which further expedited shipments through Calama.

Calama was devastated by a 1955 earthquake its reconstruction went fast and tripled its urban area. Calama grew further when the town of Chicamata next to mine of the same name was dismantled and replaced by housing in Calama in the 2003–2007 period.

== Geography ==
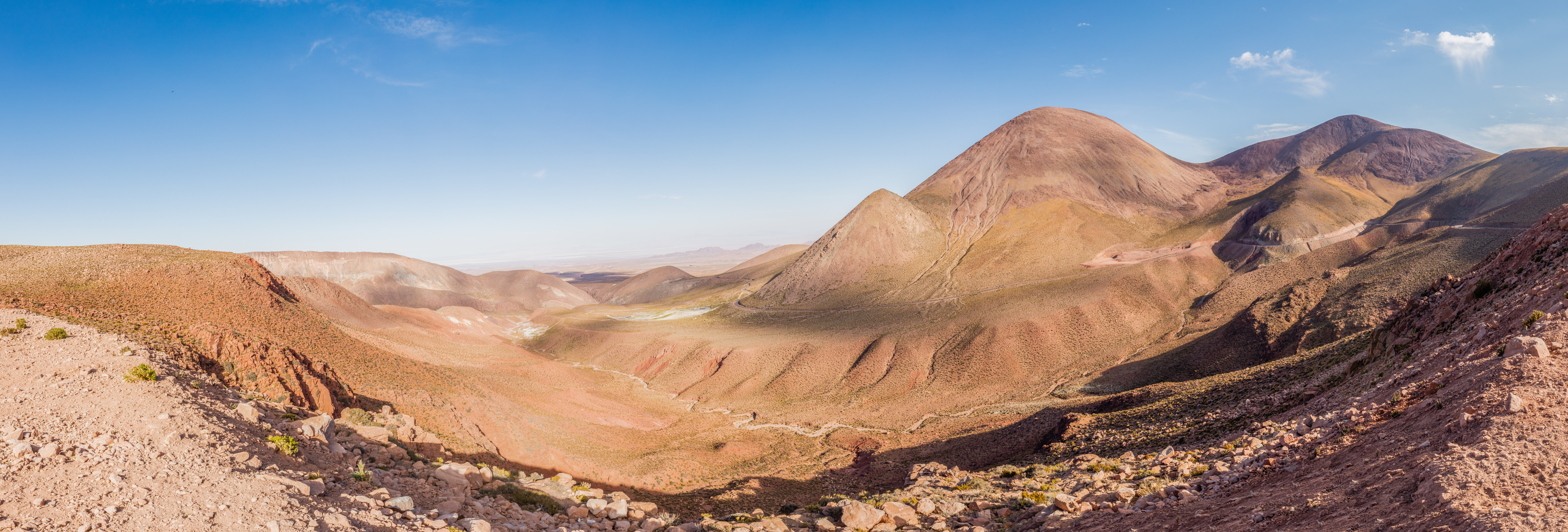
Landscape near Calama.

The western boundary of the town of Calama is marked by the peaks of the foothills, which occurs north of Calama in the foothills of the Loa River, which has many names, from north to south: Sierra Moreno, Cerros Chuquicamata Cerros de Montecristo. The Cerro Poquis (4,589 m), is the maximum altitude, north of Chuquicamata. South of it begin the foothills of the Cordillera de Domeyko, which in turn serve to chart the southern boundary of the district, with the names of Sierra de Limón Verde and Cordon Barros Arana. The passage of Loa river from east to west leaves a plain, in which the city of Calama and the oasis is located.

=== Climate ===
Calama has two distinct entities: the desert and the Andes Mountain Range. Between 2,000 and 3,000 m (6,562 and 9,843 ft), the desert climate (BWk) is characterized by annual precipitation that does not surpass 35 millimetres (1.4 in). The average temperature is 11.2 °C (52.2 °F) throughout the year with drastic changes between average daily highs of over 20 °C (68 °F) and average daily lows below 0 °C (32 °F) in winter and record highs of over 30 °C (86 °F) in summer. Light easterly winds are common in the mornings with strong westerly winds in the afternoon.

Climate data for Calama (1991–2020, extremes 1966–present)
Month	Jan	Feb	Mar	Apr	May	Jun	Jul	Aug	Sep	Oct	Nov	Dec	Year
Record high °C (°F)	31.2 (88.2)	30.4 (86.7)	29.8 (85.6)	29.6 (85.3)	28.8 (83.8)	30.6 (87.1)	30.6 (87.1)	30.3 (86.5)	29.8 (85.6)	30.4 (86.7)	30.0 (86.0)	30.3 (86.5)	31.2 (88.2)
Mean daily maximum °C (°F)	24.8 (76.6)	24.7 (76.5)	24.3 (75.7)	23.6 (74.5)	22.3 (72.1)	21.4 (70.5)	21.1 (70.0)	22.4 (72.3)	23.4 (74.1)	24.3 (75.7)	24.8 (76.6)	25.0 (77.0)	23.5 (74.3)
Daily mean °C (°F)	15.8 (60.4)	15.9 (60.6)	15.1 (59.2)	13.6 (56.5)	11.9 (53.4)	10.9 (51.6)	10.6 (51.1)	11.4 (52.5)	12.3 (54.1)	13.3 (55.9)	14.0 (57.2)	15.0 (59.0)	13.3 (55.9)
Mean daily minimum °C (°F)	6.8 (44.2)	7.1 (44.8)	6.0 (42.8)	3.7 (38.7)	1.6 (34.9)	0.3 (32.5)	0.4 (32.7)	0.4 (32.7)	1.2 (34.2)	2.3 (36.1)	3.2 (37.8)	4.9 (40.8)	3.1 (37.6)
Record low °C (°F)	−3.0 (26.6)	−4.0 (24.8)	−3.0 (26.6)	−9.5 (14.9)	−7.6 (18.3)	−9.1 (15.6)	−9.6 (14.7)	−12.5 (9.5)	−7.0 (19.4)	−7.5 (18.5)	−6.0 (21.2)	−2.2 (28.0)	−12.5 (9.5)
Average precipitation mm (inches)	0.4 (0.02)	1.4 (0.06)	0.8 (0.03)	0.2 (0.01)	1.3 (0.05)	0.6 (0.02)	1.0 (0.04)	0.8 (0.03)	0.1 (0.00)	0.0 (0.0)	0.0 (0.0)	0.0 (0.0)	6.6 (0.26)
Average precipitation days (≥ 1.0 mm)	0.2	0.3	0.2	0.1	0.2	0.2	0.2	0.2	0.0	0.0	0.0	0.0	1.5
Average relative humidity (%)	42	47	47	39	34	34	33	31	32	32	31	36	37
Mean monthly sunshine hours	353.4	305.1	319.3	312.0	306.9	297.0	310.0	316.2	321.0	356.5	363.0	365.8	3,926.2
Mean daily sunshine hours	11.4	10.8	10.3	10.4	9.9	9.9	10.0	10.2	10.7	11.5	12.1	11.8	10.8
Source 1: Dirección Meteorológica de Chile
Source 2: NOAA (precipitation days 1991–2020), Universidad de Chile (sunshine hours)

== Demographics ==
Historical population
Year	Pop.	±% p.a.
1885	3,083	—
1895	5,061	+5.08%
1907	9,525	+5.41%
1920	19,403	+5.63%
1930	24,257	+2.26%
1940	30,300	+2.25%
1952	44,563	+3.27%
1970	70,105	+2.55%
1982	100,401	+3.04%
1992	121,807	+1.95%
2002	138,402	+1.29%
2017	165,731	+1.21%
2024	166,334	+0.05%
Source: INE, Memoria Chilena

As of the 2024 census, the population is 166,334, of which 49.5% are male and 50.5% are female. People under 15 years old make up 20.9% of the population, and people over 65 years old make up 9.0%. 97.2% of the population is urban and 2.8% is rural.

=== Immigration ===
As of the 2024 census, immigrants make up 21.2% of the population - 20.9% are from South America, 0.2% from North America, 0.1% from Europe, 0.05% from Asia, 0.005% from Africa, and 0.001% from Oceania.

== Administration ==
As a commune, Calama is a third-level administrative division of Chile administered by a municipal council, headed by an alcalde who is directly elected every four years. The 2008-2012 alcalde is Esteban Velásquez Núñez.

Within the electoral divisions of Chile, Calama is represented in the Chamber of Deputies by Marcos Espinosa (PRSD) and Felipe Ward (UDI) as part of the 3rd electoral district, (together with Tocopilla, María Elena, Ollagüe and San Pedro de Atacama). The commune is represented in the Senate by Carlos Cantero Ojeda (Ind.) and José Antonio Gómez Urrutia (PRSD) as part of the 2nd senatorial constituency (Antofagasta Region).

== Transport ==
Calama is served by the El Loa Airport.
