= El Loa =

El Loa Province Provincia El Loa
- Province
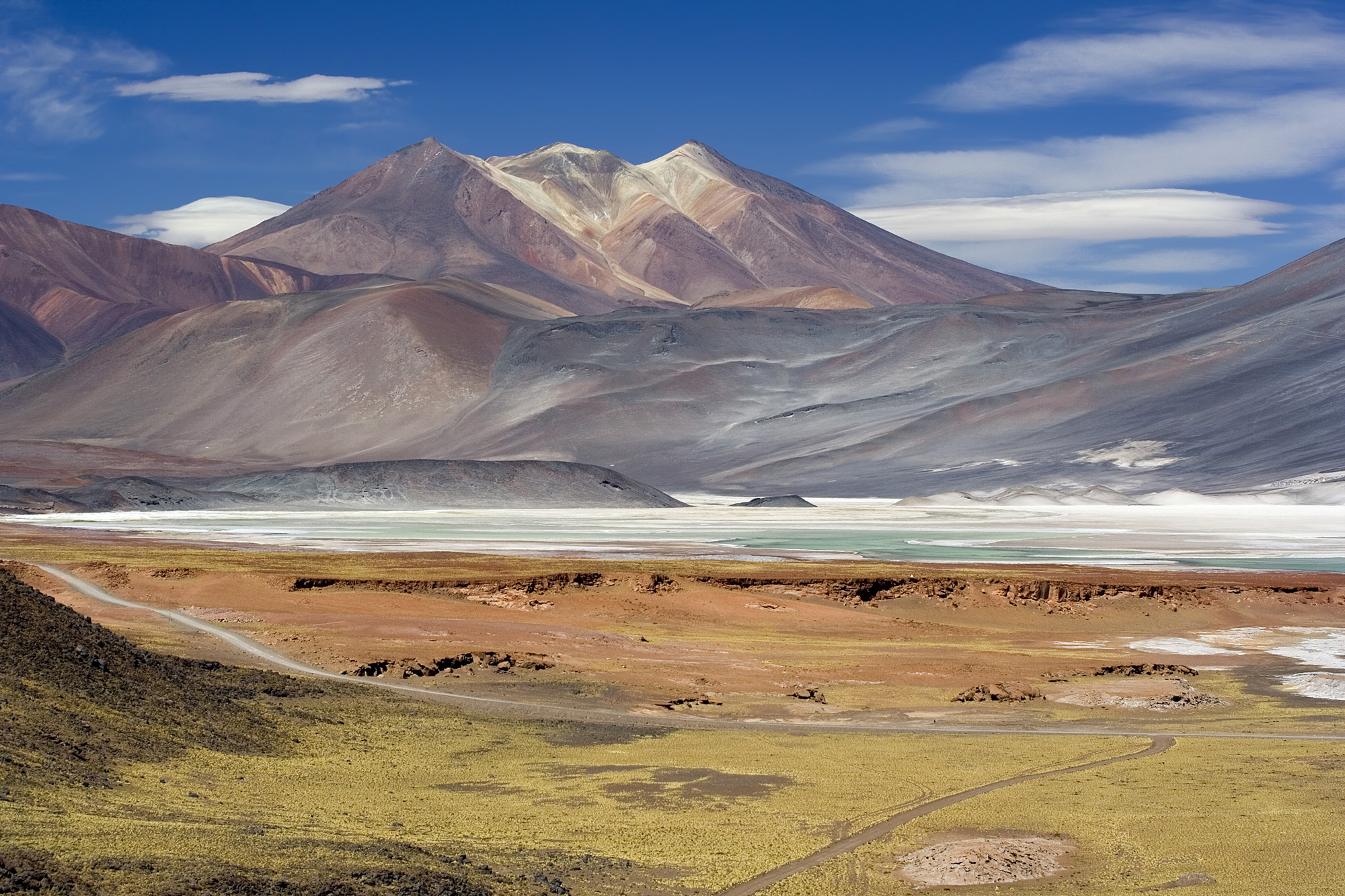
- Miscanti Lake

- Seal

- Location in the Antofagasta Region

- Location in Chile
- Coordinates: 22°50′S 68°07′W
- Country: Chile
- Region: Antofagasta
- Capital: Calama
- Communes: Calama; Ollagüe; San Pedro de Atacama

Government
  - Type: Provincial
  - Presidential Provincial Delegate: Miguel Ballesteros Candia (Democratic Revolution)

Area
  - Total: 41,999.6 km^{2} (16,216.1 sq mi)

Population (2012 Census)
  - Total: 142,686
  - Density: 3.39732/km^{2} (8.79901/sq mi)
  - Urban: 138,538
  - Rural: 5,151

Sex
  - Men: 73,970
  - Women: 69,719
- Time zone: UTC-4 (CLT)
  - Summer (DST): UTC-3 (CLST)
- Area code: 56 + 55
- Website: www.gobernacionloa.gov.cl

El Loa Province (Spanish: Provincia El Loa) is one of three provinces of the northern Chilean region of Antofagasta (II). It is named after the longest of rivers in Chile, the Loa River. The provincial capital is Calama.

== Geography and demography ==
According to the 2012 census by the National Statistics Institute (INE), the province spans an area of 41,999.6 km^{2} (16,216 sq mi) and had a population of 142,686 inhabitants, giving it a population density of 3.4/km^{2} (9/sq mi). It is the sixth largest province in the country. Between the 1992 and 2002 censuses, the population grew by 14.9% (18,610 persons).

== Communes ==
- Calama (capital)
- Ollagüe
- San Pedro de Atacama
