= Bofedales =

Type of wetland in the Andes

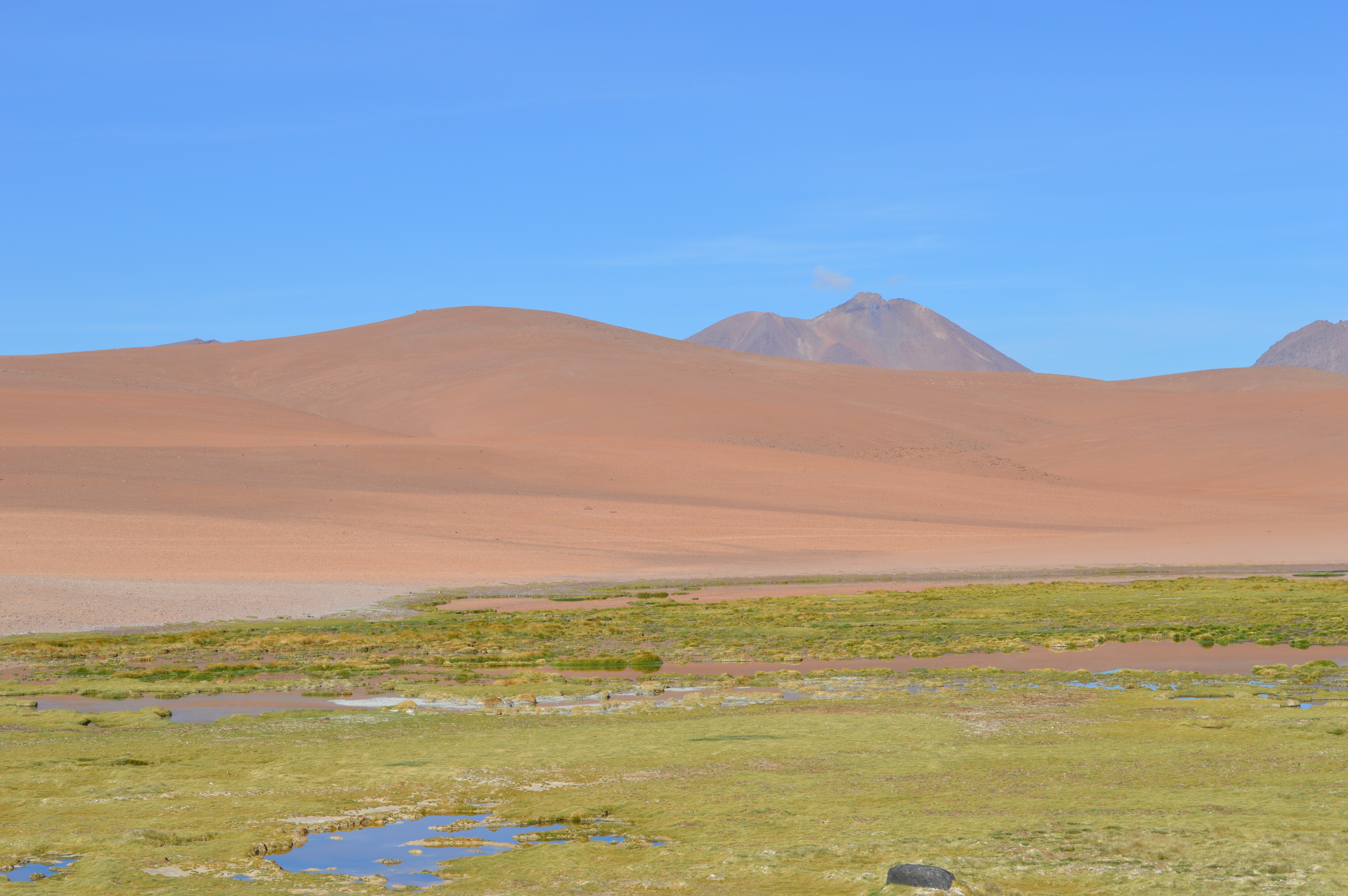
Quepiaco in the Atacama Desert in Chile

Bofedales (singular bofedal), known in some parts of Peru as oconales, are a type of wetland found in the Andes. They feature in the land use and ecology of high Andean ecosystems. They form in flat areas around ponds or streams and may be permanent or seasonal, and they can be man made or natural. Bofedales are associated with organic material in the soil and their green colour often contrasts with that of the drier surrounding landscape.

They are found at elevations exceeding 3,800 metres (12,500 ft) above sea level. Bofedales absorb the limited amount of water derived from snow, glacier meltwater and rain showers, storing it in ground and slowly releasing it. Their vegetation is dominated by cushion plants. Numerous animals including birds, mammals and invertebrates occur in bofedales. They are used by humans, who have created new such wetlands through irrigation, but human activities can also be a threat to these ecosystems.

== Name and classification ==
Bofedal is the singular term; the plural is Bofedales. The Quechua languages have terms like oqho, hoq’o, waylla and qochawiña, while the Aymara language terms are juqhu and jukhu; there are also spelling variants. Vega refers to wetlands, which frequently but not always are bofedales. The term "bofedal"/"bofedales" is frequently used for other types of wetlands or Andean ecosystems that do not need the definition.

== Characteristics ==
Bofedales are wetlands featuring cushion plants in the Andes between Colombia and Venezuela in the north to Patagonia in the south. The surrounding drier, yellow landscape contrasts notably with the green bofedales, creating landscapes of great aesthetic value. The tropical Andes feature numerous vegetation zones, with the páramo in the north having the highest humidity. To the south moisture decreases and the distinction between the wet season and dry season increases, yielding the transition from the páramo to the jalca vegetation and finally to the puna grassland. The Puna contains both xerophytic and wet sections. Analogous ecosystems exist in the mountains of East Africa, Hawaii and New Guinea.

The landscape of a bofedal features ponds, lawns and hummocks. Plants growing in bofedales form cushions, meadows, shrubs or flat-growing forms. The bofedales can reach sizes of more than 1 square kilometre (0.39 sq mi) or less than 1 hectare (2.5 acres). In Chile, long and narrow bofedales form at the bottom of valleys. They usually form on flat terrain, next to ponds, springs and streams, but most of the water is underground. The water originates as groundwater or from rivers, lakes and glaciers and is only slowly released by the bofedales, which thus constitute important water stores for the dry season, allowing streams to continue flowing. Almost all river systems in southern Peru have bofedales in their headwaters.

The climate conditions are often extreme, featuring high insolation and strong winds, lack of precipitation and oxygen due to the thin atmosphere at these elevations, low temperatures with daily frosts and a short growing season. Bofedales sometimes exist only seasonally, others are present year-round. They feature peat or organic soils that can store significant quantities of carbon, equivalent to ten times that of normal Sphagnum peat. They retain and filter nutrients. Sometimes the ground is so soft that animals can sink into it. Where bofedales have been dated, such as in Chile, they began development during the Holocene after deglaciation and often only during the last few millennia (including the Little Ice Age), when conditions became wetter.

== Occurrence ==
Map of the bofedales at the sources of Silala River next to the Bolivia–Chile border.

As of 2012, almost 549.36 square kilometres (212.11 sq mi) of Peru were covered by bofedales; this is about 0.4% of the country. Remote sensing found that in 1992–1993 about 1.4% of the Altiplano, about 2,064 square kilometres (797 sq mi), were bofedales. In Chile large swathes of the Altiplano in the regions of Arica y Parinacota and Tarapacá are covered by bofedales. Relative to this region bofedales in the more arid Antofagasta Region are smaller and more isolated. The southernmost bofedales of the Central Andes are found at the latitude of the Nevado Tres Cruces National Park in Chile. In Peru, most bofedales lie in glacial basins.

== Flora and fauna ==
The most important plant species in bofedales are cushion plants, including the Juncaceae Distichia muscoides and Oxychloe andina. About 61 to 62 different plant species have been recorded in Central Andean bofedales. They do not occur in every bofedal; species composition varies between regions and different parts of the same bofedal. The species composition may vary due to grazing pressure and seed dispersal by animals, water availability and temperature, the presence of nutrients and toxic elements, and different stages of the ecological succession. Many of these plant species are endemic. Bofedales have a high biological productivity, the highest of all ecosystems in the Puna.

The water of bofedales provides habitats to amphibians like frogs (Acancocha water frog, common marsupial frogs and Pleurodema marmoratum) and toads (Rhinella spinulosa). Numerous invertebrates like annelids, crustaceans, insects, planarians and snails live in bofedales. Birds living in bofedales include Andean geese, Andean lapwings, Andean negritos, buff-winged cinclodes, crested ducks, Darwin's rheas, golden-spotted ground doves, grey-breasted seedsnipes and yellow-billed teals. The food resources of bofedales also draw mammals like Andean deer, Andean foxes, guanacos, various species of mice, (Note: Including Akodon boliviensis, Auliscomys pictus, Calomys lepidus, Necromys amoenus, Phyllotis osilae and Phyllotis xanthopygus.) pampas cats, pumas, white-tailed deer, vicuñas and vizcachas.

== Human use ==
Bofedales are an important economic resource. At their elevations climatic conditions make agriculture unfeasible, while the high quality of the forage in bofedales invites animal husbandry. On the Altiplano, in drier areas they are the most important pasture. Alpacas, cattle, horses, llamas and sheep are fed there. Plants used in medicine or in spiritual activities are taken from bofedales.

Bofedales can be artificial, and many may have formed through the irrigation of pastures. Some bofedales are artificially created and sustained through irrigation to this day. Many more are at least partially modified by human activity. The Aymara, Quechua and Colla peoples have maintained traditional knowledge about the bofedales including irrigation techniques, animal rotation and the use of fire to remove dry plants. The human engineering of bofedales is poorly studied.

The water supply of Chilean cities in Atacama Desert such as Antofagasta and Calama has been, in part, historically derived from rivers tapped near bofedales. However studies show that in the early 1990s 62% of bofedales and bofedal-like vegas in northern Chile yielded water of questionable quality for human consumption. Issues related to the water quality of bofedales include the occurrence of fecal and non-fecal coliform bacteria as well as fly eggs. A limited number of bofedales that function as water sources have had their drainage improved by channels due to sanitary reasons.

Also in Chile a few bofedales and their associated aquifers have supplied water for the country's large copper mining industry. (Note: An example of this is Cerro Colorado mine which was forced to close in 2023 when its water extraction rights for Pampa Lagunillas Aquifer expired, this being the largest mine closure in Chile since El Indio mine closed in 2002.)

== Threats and conservation ==
The use of bofedales for pasture frequently results in overgrazing, although it may not always be detrimental to bofedal function. More localized threats to bofedales are mining and the extraction of peat, which can result in severe damage. Other infrastructure projects threatening bofedales are dams, road projects, and the diversion of their water sources. Climate change is a further threat to these ecosystems as decreased precipitation and glacier retreat reduces the flow of water into bofedales, which is necessary to sustain them. Whether the activities of local communities are a threat or a benefit to bofedales is unclear.

Bofedales are biodiversity hotspots, and many of the animal species living in them are threatened. Bofedales are important ecosystems in the mountains, with high levels of species diversity and endemism, and their ability to retain water reduces erosion and maintains water resources. Within the Ramsar Convention, they are counted as unforested peatlands. Some bofedales are included in protected areas but as of 2014, none were the subject of a dedicated protected area. They are considered to be vulnerable ecosystems under Peruvian environmental law. In Chile, some regions require special permissions to withdraw water from bofedales and their watersheds.

== Gallery ==
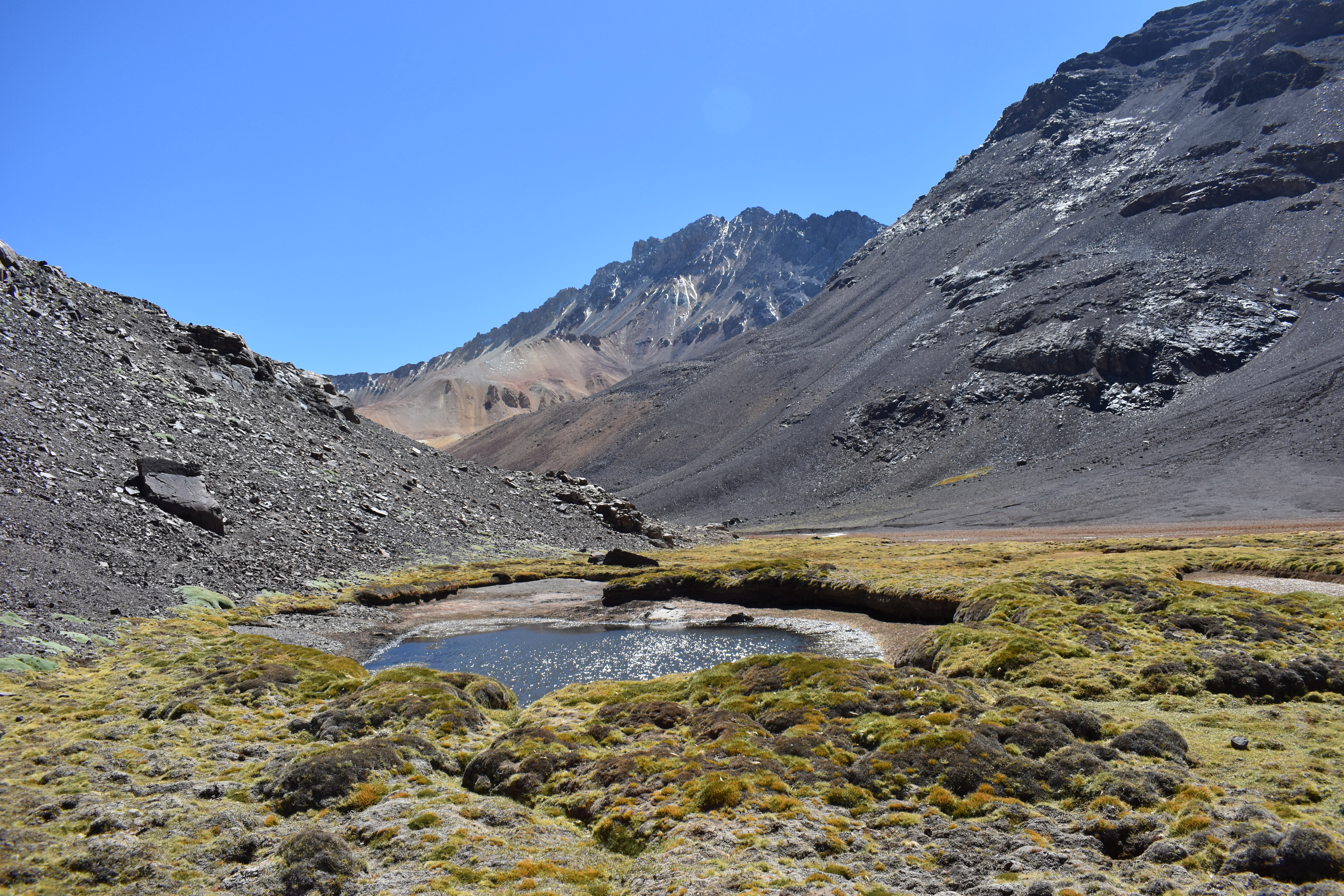
Bofedal-like landscape in Central Chile

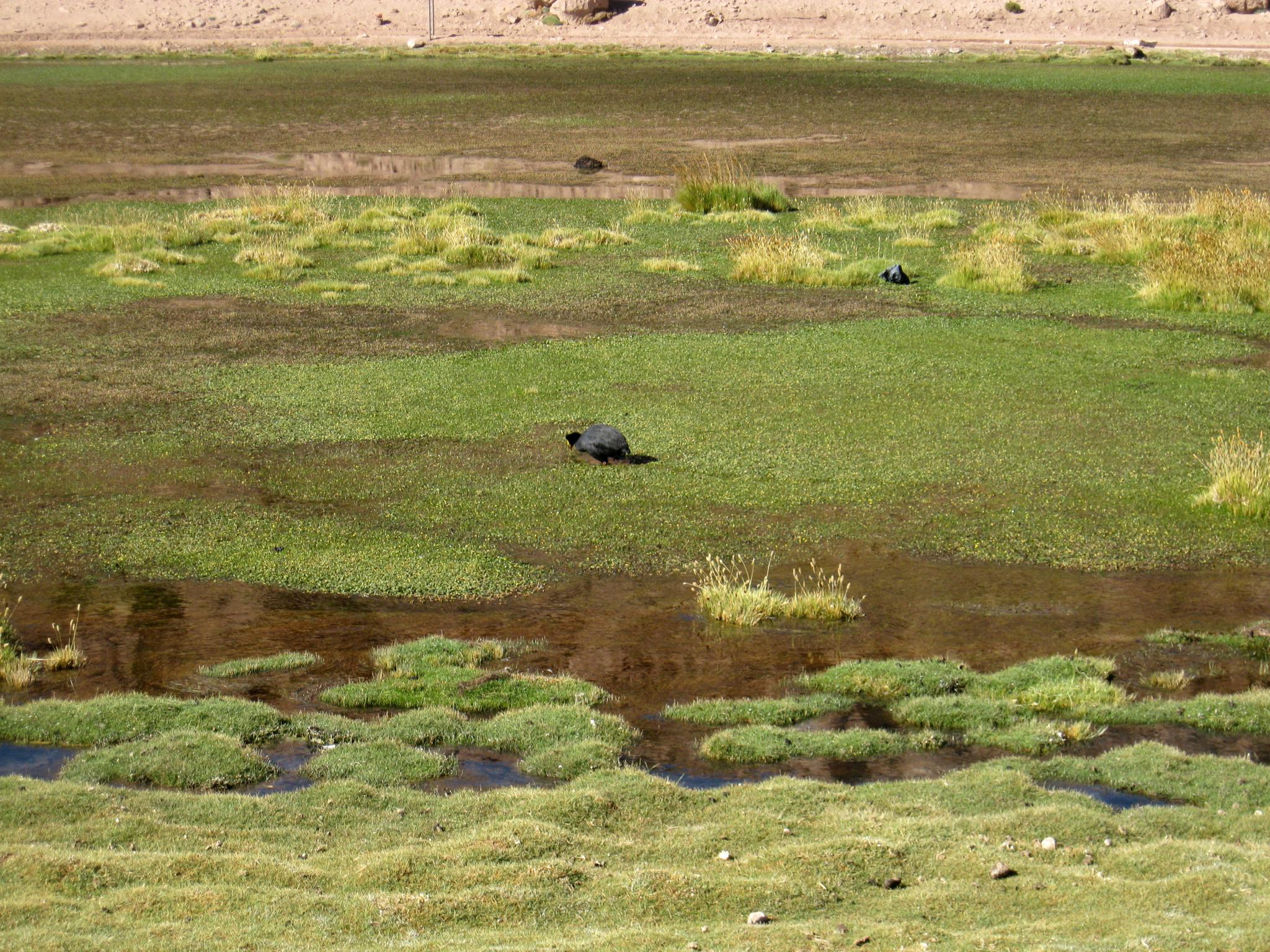
Putana River bofedal with birds

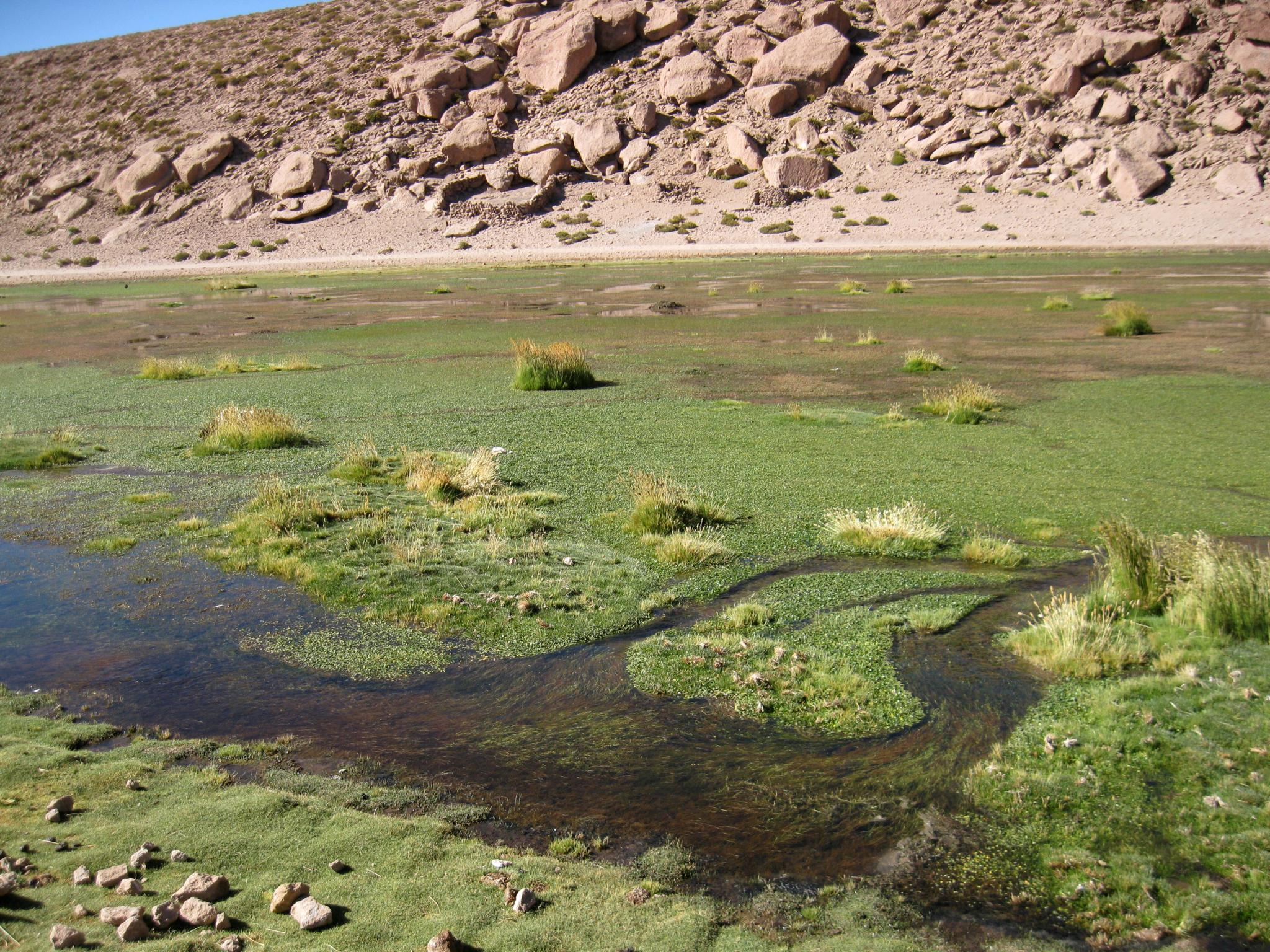
Putana River bofedal

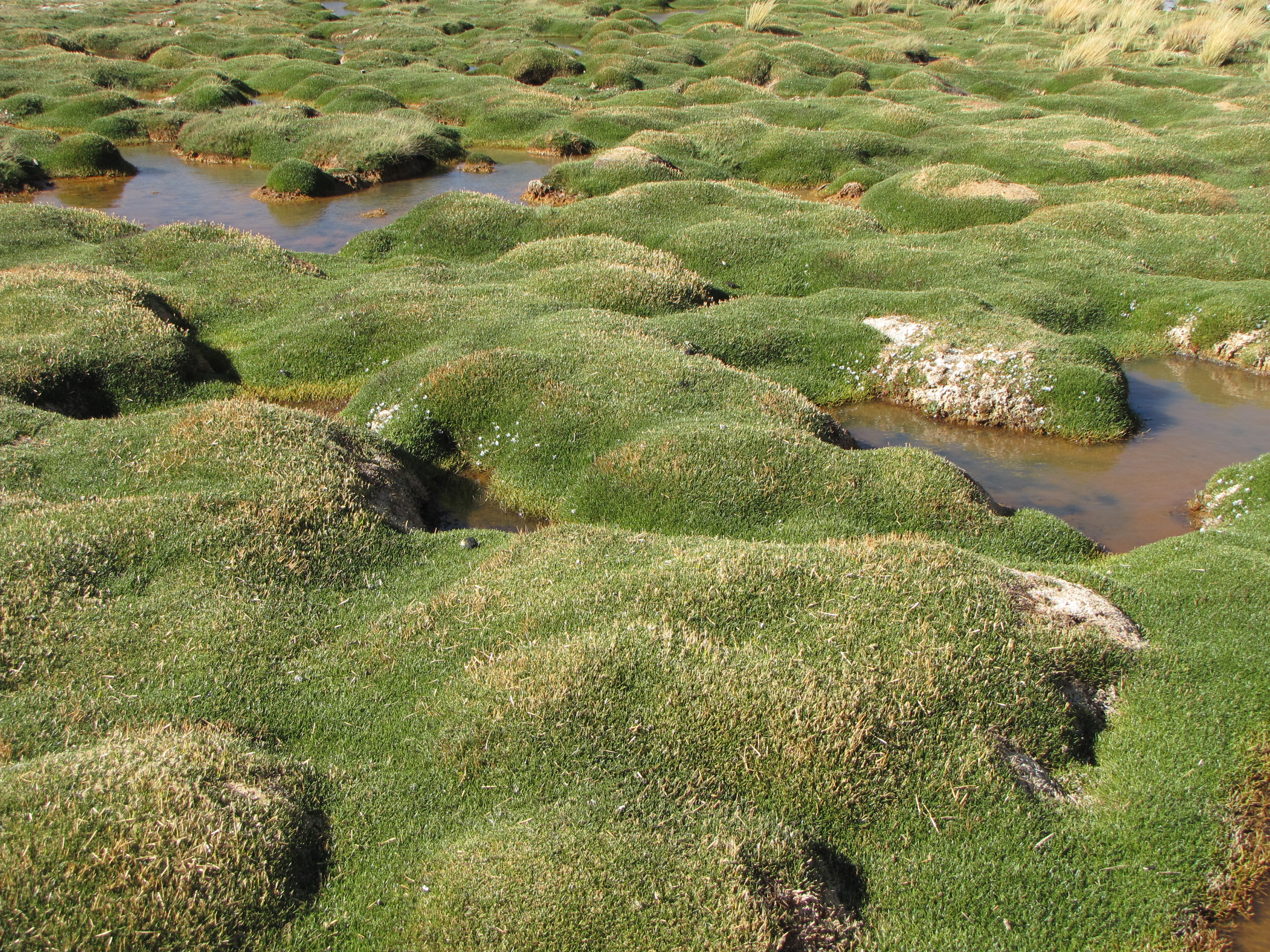
Laguna Santa Rosa bofedal

== See also ==
- Dispute over the Status and Use of the Waters of the Silala, a case at the International Court of Justice about the Silala River
- Fell
- Mallín
