= Dispute over the Status and Use of the Waters of the Silala =

International law case by Chile against Bolivia

- Court: International Court of Justice
- Full case name: Dispute over the Status and Use of the Waters of the Silala (Chile v. Bolivia)

Map of the sources of Silala River in Bolivia.

Dispute over the Status and Use of the Waters of the Silala (Chile v. Bolivia) was a case at the International Court of Justice. In the case, Chile petitioned the Court to declare the Silala River an "international watercourse whose use by Chile and Bolivia is governed by customary international law." Chile presented the case in 2016 while the Bolivian case against Chile, Obligation to Negotiate Access to the Pacific Ocean, was still ongoing. According to France 24 the case came as a surprise. The upper area of Silala River around the Bolivia–Chile border have had its flow enhanced by channels since 1928 for sanitary reasons given that the river sources lie in small wetlands. These wetlands are bofedales with insect fauna and were intervened for better drainage after fly eggs were detected in the water supply of the city of Antofagasta.

Bolivia's position is that the waters of the Silala flow into Chile through artificial channels, while Chile claims that it is an international river. Bolivia also sought a ruling that specified that any future enhanced flow into Chile had to be the subject of an agreement.

As a backdrop to the dispute none of the parties had signed the 1997 Convention on the Law of Non-Navigational Uses of International Watercourses or the 1992 Convention on the Protection and Use of Transboundary Watercourses and International Lakes and there was no specific basin agreement. Bolivia had as of 2022 made little use of the waters the Silala River given an unfavourable geographical position.

Within the context of the Bolivian demand for sovereign access to the Pacific Ocean Bolivian President Evo Morales threatened various times during his 2006–2019 ternures to reduce the flow into Chile and charge Chile for the use of its water.

== Court ruling and reactions ==
On December 1, 2022, the ICJ delivered its judgement in the case. It found that the 'parties agree with respect to the legal status of the Silala River', and therefore the Court was not called upon to give a decision. The court also established that any improvement in the flow of the river did not have repercussions in customary international law.

Various sources, like El País, described the ruling as favourable to Chile, as the court acknowledged the international character of Silala River, which was the prime Chilean objective. The Chilean ministry of foreign affairs said it "appreciated" the court ruling and the president of Chile Gabriel Boric said that "Chile went for judicial certainty and obtained it".

The ruling did not say much on the specifics of the management of the water resources, but it recognized Bolivia's right to carry out certain types of unilateral measures in its territory, such as dismantling the channels. Bolivian newspapers found the ruling favourable to Bolivia, taking note of the court's acknowledgement of certain Bolivian rights and its rejection of Chile's claim that Bolivia was not fulfilling its obligations under international law.

According to lawyer Raquel Cárcar Izurriaga of the University of Navarra the ruling diminishes the potential for future conflicts over the river but does not remove them completely, since rightful Bolivian actions could upset Chile. The magnitude of any international conflicts arising from the Silala River is expected by Cárcar Izurriaga to remain limited given the very small amounts of water resources involved.

== See also ==
- Bofedales
- Uruguay River pulp mill dispute
