= Wanaku (Potosí) =

Mountain in Bolivia

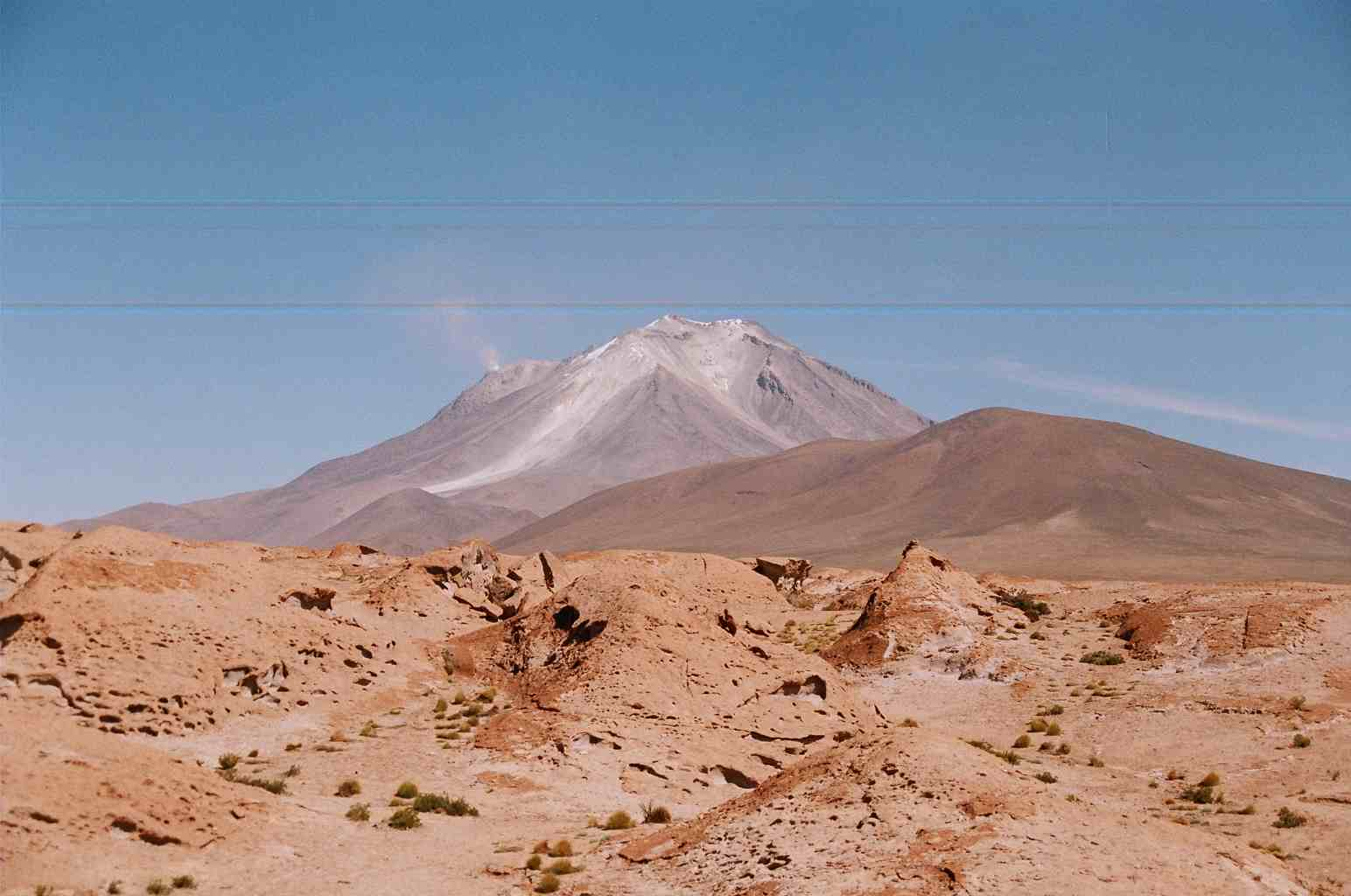
- Ollagüe (Ullawi) and Wanaku

Highest point
- Elevation: 4,700 m (15,400 ft)
- Coordinates: 21°19′37″S 68°5′39″W

Geography
- Location within Bolivia
- Location: Bolivia, Potosí Department, Nor Lípez Province
- Parent range: Andes

Wanaku (Quechua for guanaco, Hispanicized spelling Huanaco, Huanacu) is a mountain in the Andes of Bolivia, about 4,700 metres (15,420 ft) high. It is situated in the Potosí Department, Nor Lípez Province, Quemes Municipality, Pelcoya Canton. Wanaku lies southeast of the Ollagüe (Ullawi) volcano and northeast of Ch'aska Urqu.
