= Silala River =

- Loa and its tributaries San Pedro, Silala and Salado Rivers

Location
- Countries: Bolivia; Chile
- Department (BO): Potosí
- Region (CL): Antofagasta

Physical characteristics
- Source
  - elevation: c. 4400 m asl
- Mouth
  - location: Inacaliri River
- Length: 8.5 km
- Discharge
  - location: Bolivia–Chile border
  - average: 160 L/s

The Silala or Siloli is an international river arising from springs in Bolivia and flowing naturally westward into Chile. It originates in the Potosí Department of Bolivia, on the slopes of Cerro Inacaliri and Cerro de Silala in the Andean altiplano, and after crossing the international border travels approximately 7 km through the Antofagasta Region of Chile before joining the San Pedro de Inacaliri River, a tributary of the Loa River, which ultimately discharges into the Pacific Ocean.

The river's status was for many years the subject of a bilateral dispute: Bolivia maintained that the watercourse was an artificial creation, its springs redirected into Chilean territory by man-made canals, while Chile held that it was a natural international river to whose waters both countries were entitled under international law. In 2016, Chile brought the matter before the International Court of Justice in the case Dispute over the Status and Use of the Waters of the Silala. During proceedings, Bolivia recognised the water body as a river, reducing the controversy to the question of artificial infrastructure. On 1 December 2022, the Court ruled that the Silala is an international river and that Chile holds an equitable and reasonable right to use its waters.

== Course ==
The Silala originates on the slopes of Cerro Inacaliri (5,689 m) and Cerro de Silala (5,703 m), at the northern end of the Eduardo Avaroa Andean Fauna National Reserve, in the Sud Lípez Province, Potosí Department, Bolivia. The main source lies approximately 4 km from the border with Chile, at 22°0′34″S 68°0′12″W, from which the watercourse flows westward. About 2.5 km from its source it is joined by a second stream originating 400 m higher, at 22°0′18″S 68°1′24″W.

After the two streams merge and enter a small gorge, the Silala descends some 720 m to reach the Bolivia–Chile border. From that point it travels approximately 7 km until it joins the Cajón River at 22°2′31″S 68°4′44″W in Chile, together forming the San Pedro de Inacaliri River. That river in turn flows into the Loa, the longest river in Chile and the principal watercourse crossing the Atacama Desert, which ultimately discharges into the Pacific Ocean.

== Hydrology ==
The river has a flow-gauging station from which annual mean discharge records are available for the period 2000–2006, showing an average annual flow of somewhat less than 0.2 m³/s. At the Bolivia–Chile border, average discharge is recorded at 160 L/s.

== Dispute over its status and use ==
The division of the flow from this water body was for many years a matter of controversy between Bolivia and Chile. Chile maintained that the river's present course makes it an international river, while Bolivia denied that any river existed, asserting that the Silala springs would not flow into Chile were it not for artificial canals constructed over a century ago.

Between 1999 and 2016, Bolivia characterised the water body as a series of springs—referred to as the Silala springs—originating from a collection of water eyes and bofedales that merge to form a single body, and which it claimed had been artificially channelled by Chile to divert their waters into Chilean territory for industrial use.

Chile maintained that the watercourse originates in Bolivia and flows naturally westward by virtue of the terrain's gradient, crossing the border and thus constituting a successive and transboundary watercourse—that is, an international river—belonging to the drainage basin of the Loa River and therefore to the Pacific Ocean hydrological basin. Chile further argued that both nations have the right to use its waters in a reasonable and equitable manner under international law governing international watercourses used for purposes other than navigation, and that any engineering works carried out in its channel were minor, did not alter the river's natural course, and were intended solely to reduce water loss through infiltration.

In 2016, Chile brought proceedings against Bolivia before the International Court of Justice. In its counter-memorial, Bolivia recognised the water body as a river, narrowing the remaining controversy to the question of artificial infrastructure, which Bolivia claimed had increased the flow reaching Chile by 30%. In 2022, the Court ruled that the water body is in fact an international river and that Chile has an equitable and reasonable right to use its waters, thereby resolving the dispute between the two countries.

== Sources ==
- EVALUACION DE LOS RECURSOS HIDRICOS SUPERFICIALES EN LA CUENCA DEL RIO BIO BIO (PDF)
