= Cerro Colorado mine =

Mine in Chile

Cerro Colorado
- Location within Chile
- Location: Pozo Almonte, Tarapacá Region, Chile; 20°2′59.48″S 69°15′36.65″W
- Products: Copper
- Production: 35,000 tonnes copper
- Financial year: 2023
- Opened: 1994
- Closed: 2023
- Company: Pampa Norte (BHP)

Cerro Colorado is an open pit copper mine located in the Atacama Desert of northern Chile. More precisely it lies in the commune of Pozo Almonte in Tarapacá Region. It lies about 90 km east of the port city of Iquique and 45 km north of the oasis town of Pica. In 2023 the mine was closed as its permit expired to extract water from the bofedal-hosting aquifer of Lagunillas expired and was not renewed. In addition the mine hass faced problems of water supply, as the cost of establishing a supply by desalination at the coast is high relative to earnings of the mine and BHP has pledge not to use continental waters such as the nearby Lagunillas Aquifer. According to Reporte Minero & Energético it is the first large mine closure in Chile since El Indio begun its closure process in 2002. However, the operating company Pampa Norte (owned by BHP) have stated that the mine will reopen when issues are resolved, and –if a new environmental impact assessment is approved by authorities– Pampa Norte plans to start in 2028 works for a reopening near 2030.

In 2023 the mine produced 35,000 tonnes of copper, but had once a peak annual production of little over 130,000 tonnes of copper.
