= San Pedro de Inacaliri River =

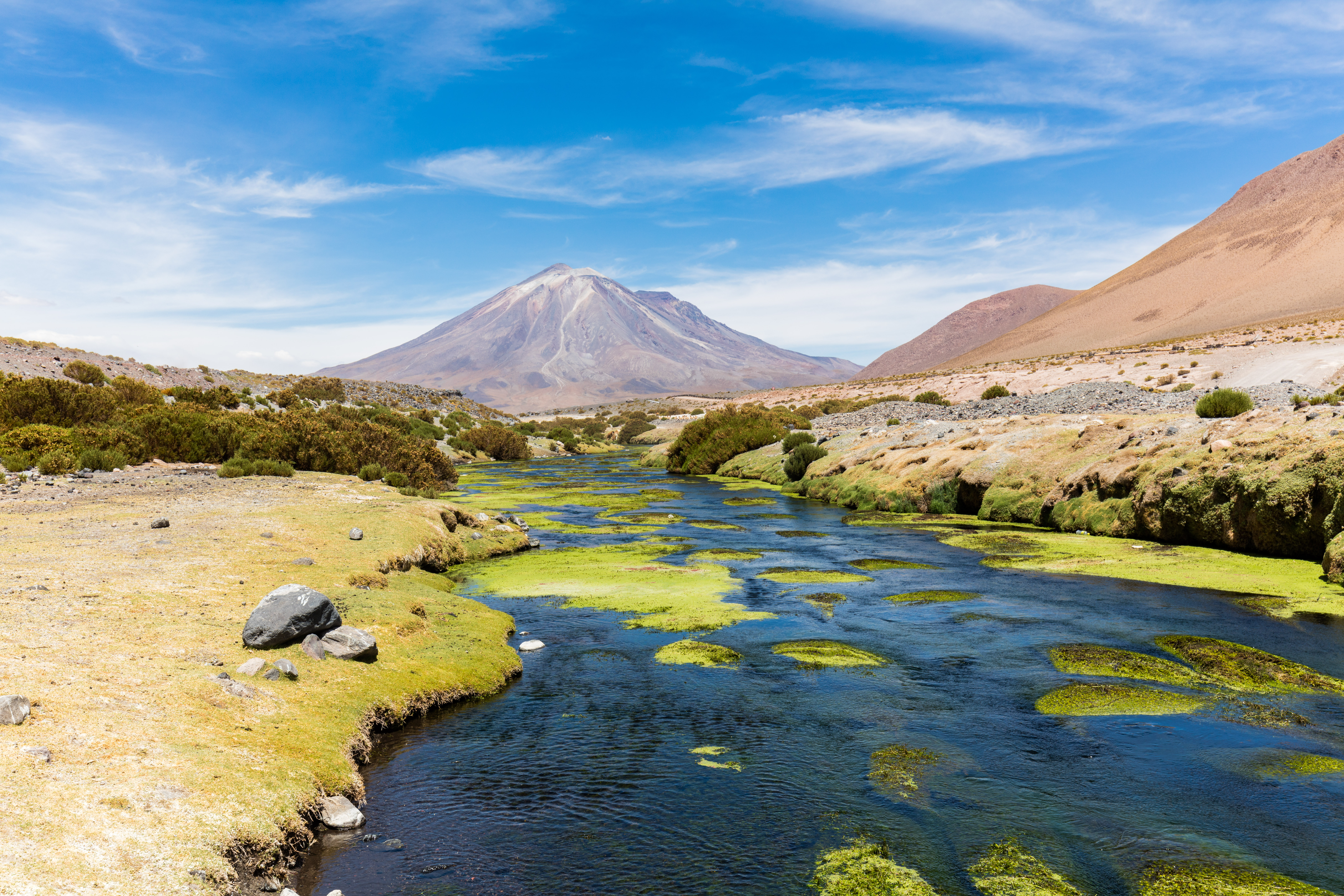
- San Pedro River and Paniri volcano

Location
- Country: Chile

Physical characteristics
- Mouth
  - location: Loa River
- Length: 76 km (47 mi)
- Basin size: 9,850 km^{2} (3,800 sq mi)
- Discharge
  - average: 0.2 m^{3}/s (7.1 cu ft/s)

Basin features
- Tributaries
  - left: Silala River

San Pedro de Inacaliri River, or called simply San Pedro River, is a river of Chile located in El Loa Province, Antofagasta Region. It begins at the confluence of the rivers Silala and Cajón, at an elevation over 4,000 m asl.

A part of its flow is diverted (between 50 and 60 L/s) and conducted across the desert to Chuquicamata for domestic water supply. About 8 km south, the waters of the river disappear in a floodplain area to reappear 15 km downstream at the so-called Ojos del San Pedro in the form of a partially overground stream, at the eastern border of a salt flat with a surface of 5 km^{2}.

Loa and its tributaries San Pedro, Silala and Salado Rivers

Before discharging into Loa River, the river skirts the San Pedro volcano, where it has carved a 100-m-deep canyon through a rhyolite lava flow.
