= Pampa Lagunillas Aquifer =

Coordinates: 19°56′0.21″S 68°50′3.74″W

Pampa Lagunillas Aquifer (Spanish: acuífero Pampa Lagunillas or acuífero Lagunillas) is a body of underground water in the Atacama Desert and the western edge of the Altiplano Plateau in Chile. The aquifer lies in an endorheic basin at 4,000 to 4,100 meters above sea level. The water is hosted in alluvial sedimentary fill, pyroclastic deposits and fractured ignimbrites. On surface the alluvial plain associated with the aquifer has an area of about 30 km^{2} and a bofedal wetland.

The aquifer had a well field established in the mid-1990s to supply freshwater to the Cerro Colorado copper mine 45 km to the west. Initially an abstraction of 120 L/s for 30 years was planned and by 2015 the mine reported to extract c. 130 L/s. In 1991 groundwater levels were near surface and in local Aymara people took notice that five springs springs had dried out and in 2012 it was confirmed the groundwater level was at about 15 m belowe the surface. In the 2000s the mine was sanctioned by authorities and ordered to restore wetlands, which it did artificially by irrigating them with aquifer water. The drying of the aquifer and the surface waters above have altered the local climate by increasing air temperature oscillations in the area.

In 2023, Cerro Colorado mine was closed as its permit to extract water from the Pampa Lagunillas Aquifer expired and was not renewed. The company operating the mine, Pampa Norte (subsidiary of BHP), have stated that the mine will reopen when issues are resolved and that no water from the aquifer will be used.
