= Ch'aska Urqu (Nor Lípez) =

Mountain in Bolivia

- Location within Bolivia

Highest point
- Elevation: 4,100 m (13,500 ft)
- Coordinates: 21°21′52″S 68°9′30″W

Geography
- Location: Bolivia, Potosí Department, Nor Lípez Province
- Parent range: Andes

Ch'aska Urqu (Quechua ch'aska star; tousled, urqu mountain, "star mountain" or "tousled mountain", also spelled Chasca Orkho) is a mountain in the Andes of Bolivia, about 4,100 metres (13,451 ft) high. It is located in the Potosí Department, Nor Lípez Province, Quemes Municipality, Pelcoya Canton. Ch'aska Urqu lies near the border with Chile, southeast of the Ollagüe (Ullawi) volcano and southwest of Wanaku.
