= Bolivia–Chile border =

International border

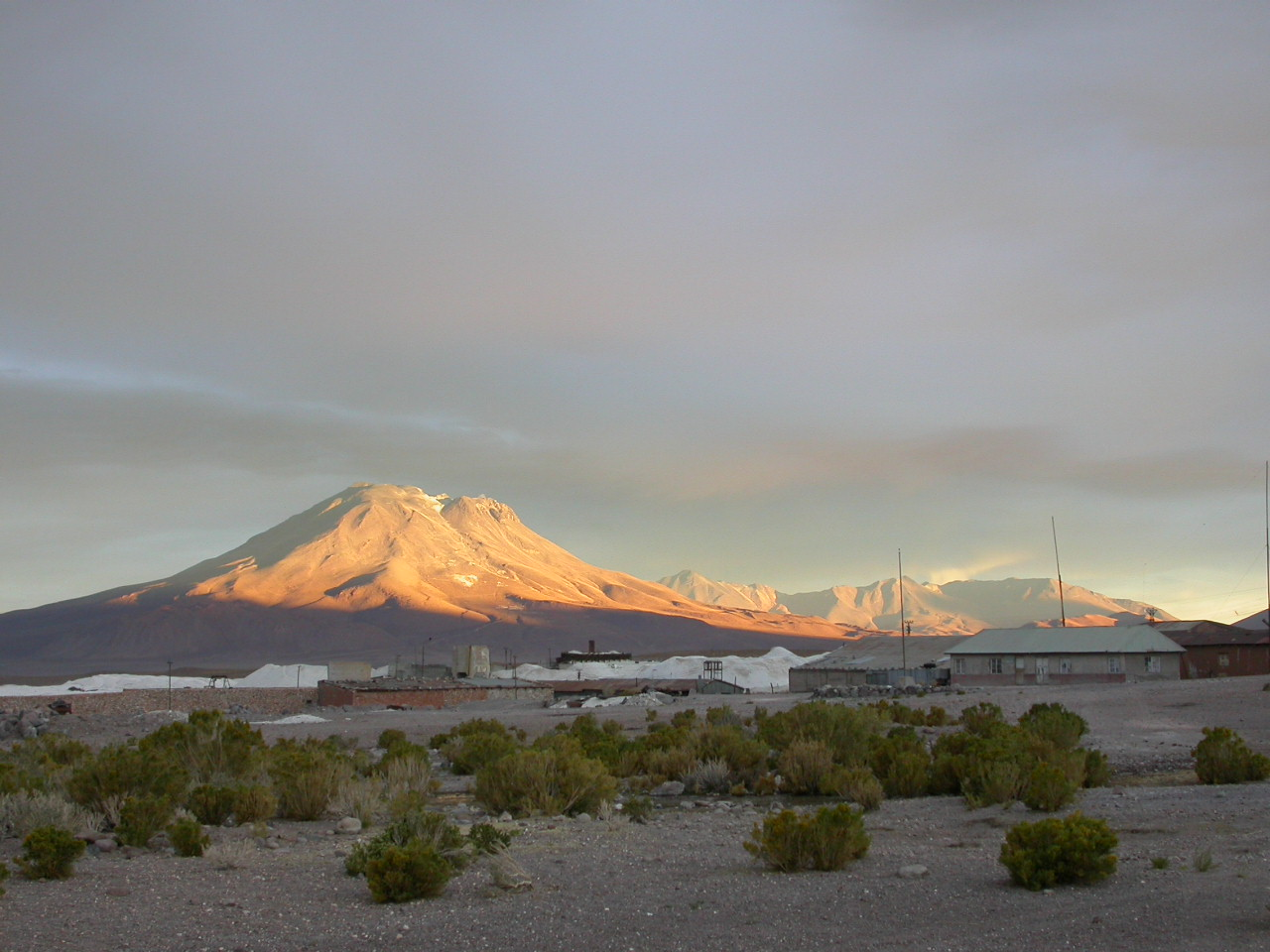
View of Ollagüe volcano on the Bolivia–Chile border from west.

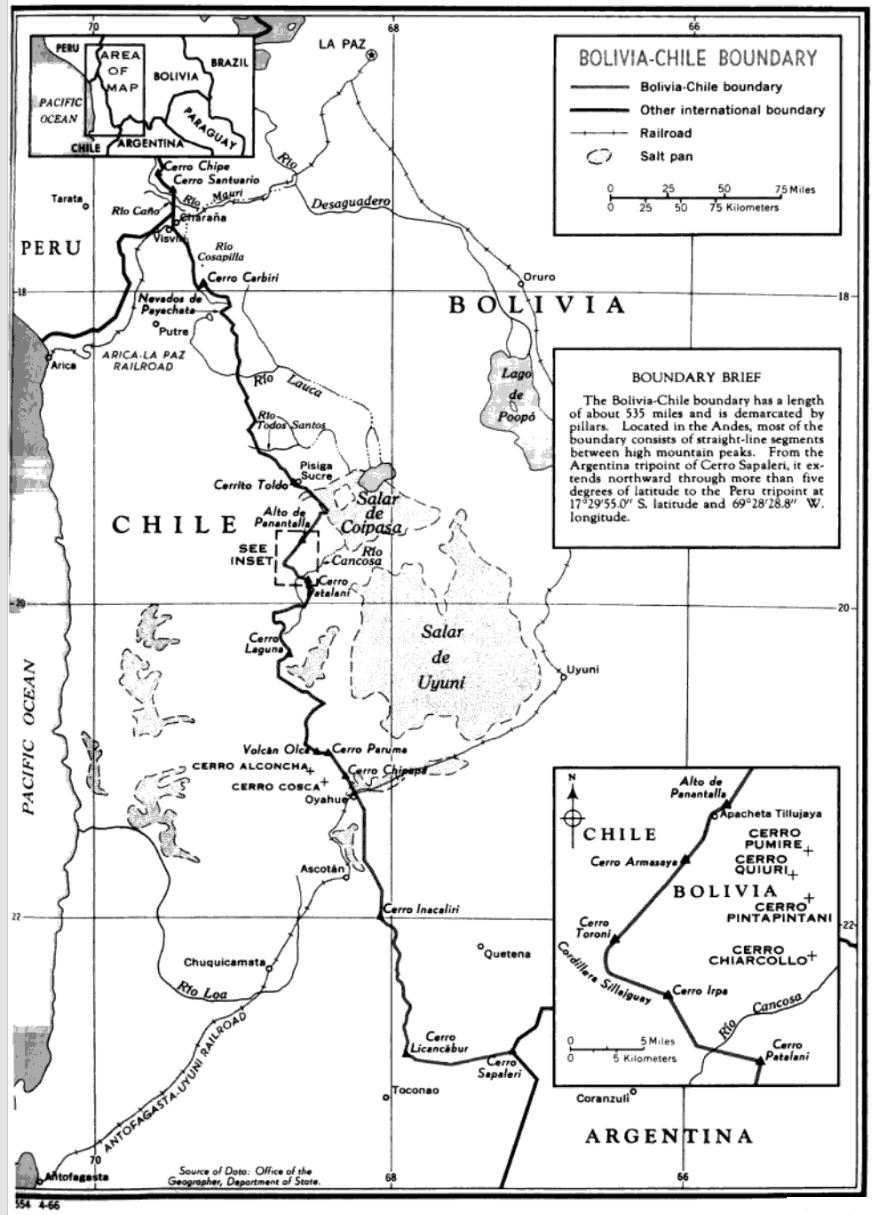
Map of the Bolivia–Chile border.

Map of the bofedal sources of Silala River in Bolivia near the Bolivia–Chile border.

The Bolivia–Chile border is an international border of South America. It separates Bolivia from Chile along Cordillera Occidental on the western edge of the Altiplano Plateau.

There is an ongoing dispute about the nature of Silala River and Chile's use of its waters.

Since 2021 the Bolivia–Chile border has been a major point of entry of irregular Venezuelan migrants into Chile. Migrants are aided in the crossing by human smugglers. Irregular migration has been particularly troublesome for the Chilean border town of Colchane.

Indigenous Aymara communities live on both sides of the border.
