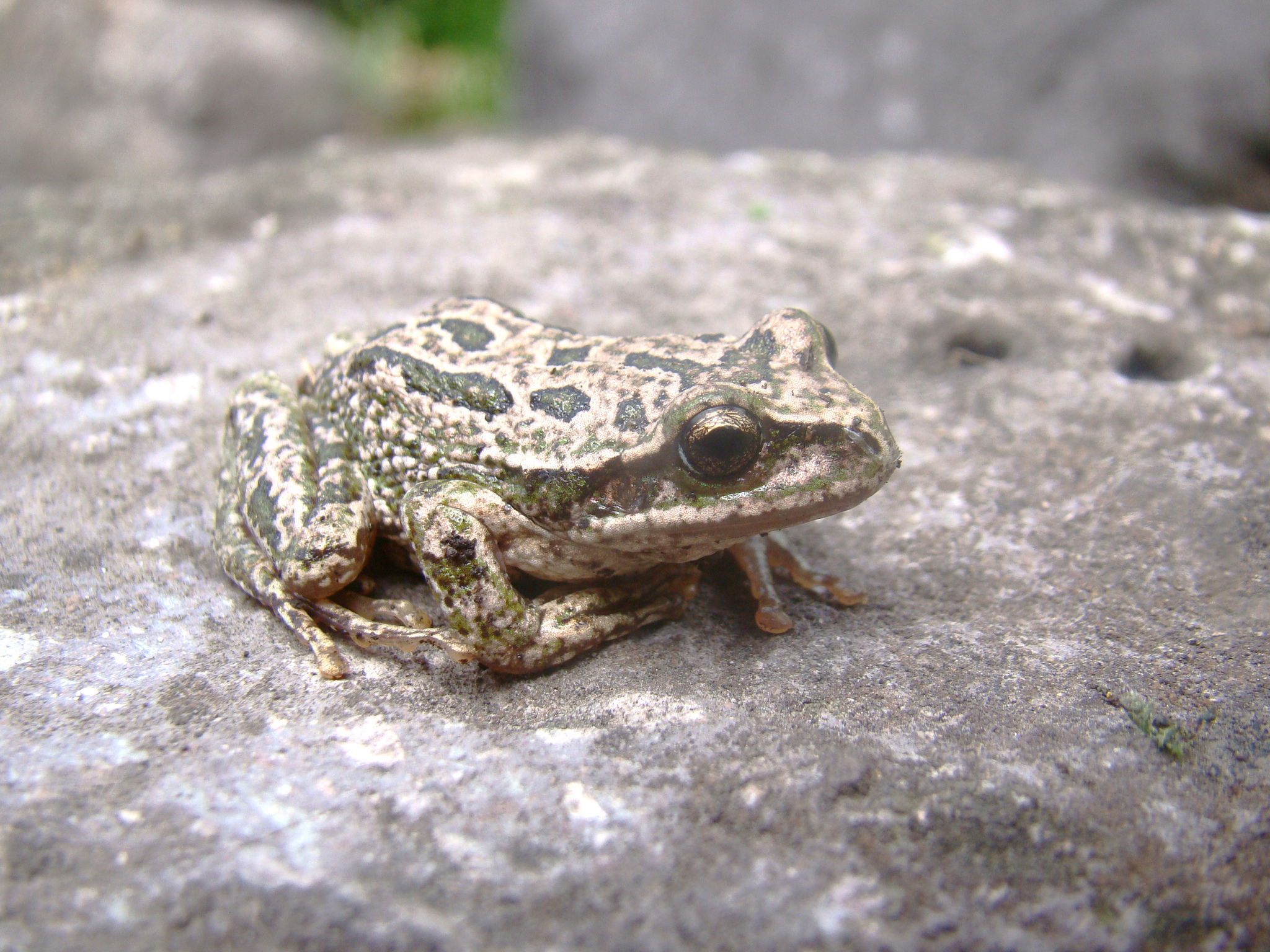

Conservation status
- Least Concern (IUCN 3.1)

Scientific classification
- Kingdom: Animalia
- Phylum: Chordata
- Class: Amphibia
- Order: Anura
- Family: Hemiphractidae
- Genus: Gastrotheca
- Species: G. marsupiata

Binomial name
- Gastrotheca marsupiata (Duméril and Bibron, 1841): Hyla marsupiata Duméril and Bibron, 1841; Nototrema marsupiatum Günther, 1859 "1858"; Chorophilus cuzcanus Cope, 1878 "1877"; Nototrema bolivianum Steindachner, 1892; Eleutherodactylus binghami Stejneger, 1913; Eleutherodactylus footei Stejneger, 1913; Gastrotheca boliviana Barbour and Noble, 1920; Hylodes footei Nieden, 1923; Hylodes binghami Nieden, 1923; Gastrotheca marsupiata marsupiata Parker, 1932; Pseudacris cuzcanus Goin, 1961; Gastrotheca bifasciata vellardi Laurent, 1969; Gastrotheca (Gastrotheca) marsupiata Dubois, 1987 "1986"

= Gastrotheca marsupiata =

Species of frog

Gastrotheca marsupiata is a species of frog in the family Hemiphractidae. It is found in the Amazonian drainage systems of Andes from central Peru to southern Bolivia. Its common names are marsupian frog, common marsupial frog, and for now synonymized Leptodactylus/Eleutherodactylus andicola, Boettger's robber frog.

== Habitat ==
This frog lives in both unchanged and recovering grasslands. Scientists have seen the frog between 2,500 and 4,660 m (8,200 and 15,290 ft) above sea level.

Scientists have reported the frog in Carrasco National Park, Tunari National Park, Cotapata National Park, and Pilon Lajas National Park. They believe it may also live in Huayllay National Sanctuary, Ampay National Sanctuary, Junin National Reserve, Chacamarca Historical Sanctuary, and Apurimac Reserved Zone.

== Reproduction ==
This frog reproduces in still water.

== Threats ==
The IUCN classifies this frog as least concern of extinction. In some places, it is in danger from habitat loss from fires and agriculture. Scientists believe climate change could affect this species as well. Scientists have detected the fungus Batrachochytrium dendrobatidis on some of these frogs in 1987, 2000, and 2001, but they are not sure if chytridiomycosis is a lethal threat.

Scientists believe people might sell these frogs as pets but they are not sure.
