= Palpana =

Volcano in Chile

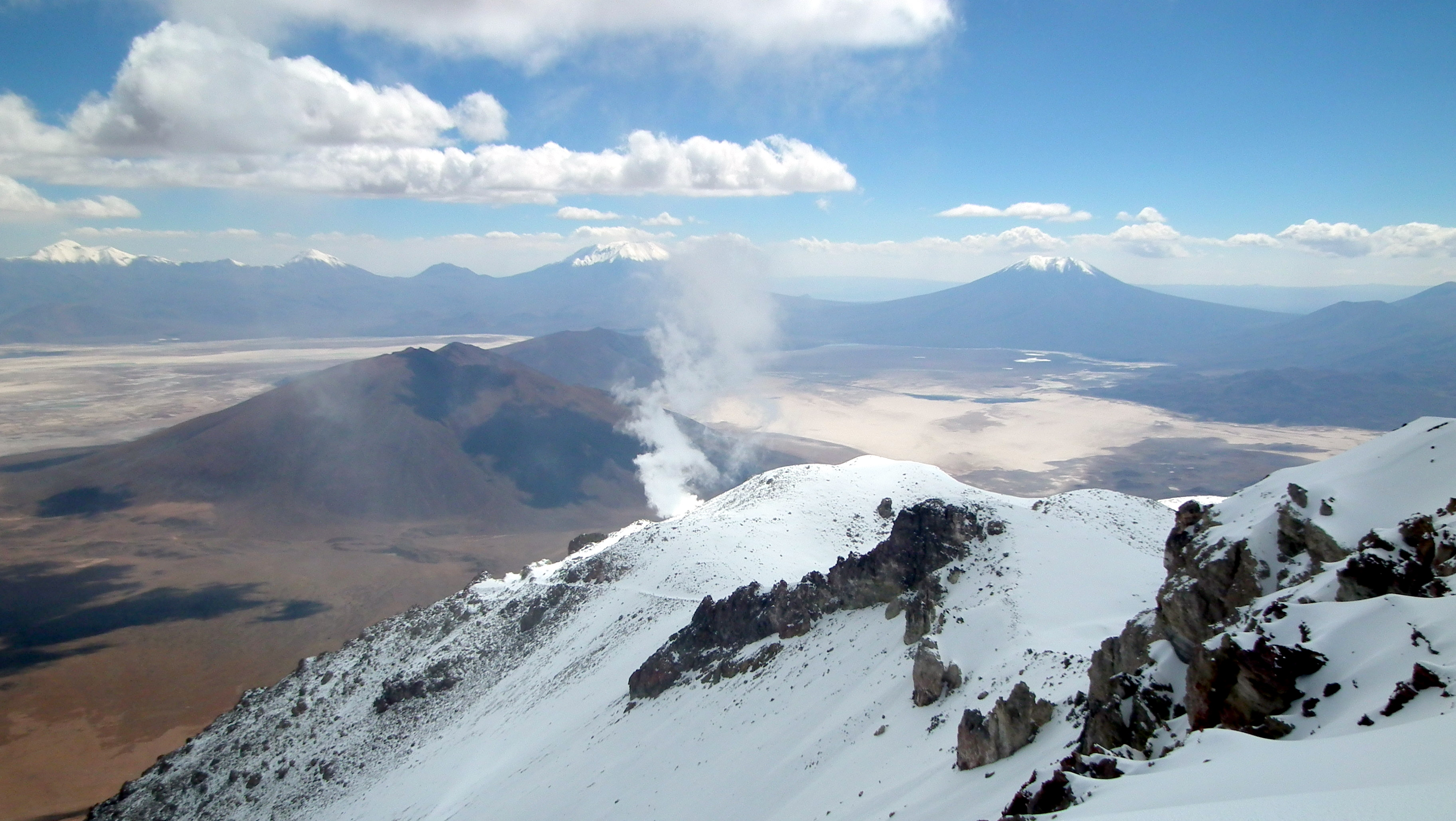
- The volcano is visible in the upper center portion of the photo, which was taken from the summit of Ollagüe volcano. Salar de Ascotán (left) and Salar de Carcote (right) are also visible in the photo.

Highest point
- Prominence: 1,947 m (6,388 ft)
- Parent peak: Aucanquilcha
- Listing: Ultra
- Coordinates: 21°32′48″S 68°31′21″W

Geography
- Location within Chile
- Location: Chile
- Parent range: Andes

Climbing
- First ascent: 13 October 1977 - José Ambrus and Jaime Sepúlveda (Chile)

Palpana (from pparpana, ram) is a volcano in the Andes of Chile. It has a summit elevation of 6,040 metres (19,820 ft). (Note: Other data from digital elevation models: SRTM yields 6,034 metres (19,797 ft), ASTER 6,024 metres (19,764 ft), SRTM filled with ASTER6,034 metres (19,797 ft), ALOS 6,024 metres (19,764 ft), TanDEM-X 6,076 metres (19,934 ft) and a handheld GPS survey by Maximo Kausch September 2012 6,050 metres (19,850 ft).) (Note: The height of the nearest key col is 4,093 metres (13,428 ft), leading to a topographic prominence of 1,947 metres (6,388 ft) with a topographical dominance of 32.24%. Its parent peak is Aucanquilcha and the Topographic isolation is 36.6 kilometres (22.7 mi).)

It is part of the dividing range between Upper Loa River basin and Salar de Ascotán basin. Together with Inacaliri and Azufre, it forms a 50 kilometres (31 mi) long volcanic chain constructed along the Inacaliri lineament. The volcano rises above an ignimbrite plain that in the area reaches an altitude of 3,700 metres (12,100 ft) and forms a chain of volcanoes with Inacaliri.

A 1.3 by 1.8 kilometres (0.81 mi × 1.12 mi) wide crater surmounts the volcano and features late lava domes. A lava dome cluster is recognizable in the central sector of the volcano, forming a flat area with a surface of 4.7 square kilometres (1.8 sq mi). The volcano contains basaltic rocks with an extrusion formed from more silicic rock. Layers of mafic andesite, scoria and some pumice extend outwards away from the central sector. The volcano rises 6,023 metres (19,760 ft) above its terrain and its average summit slope is 26°. The western flank underwent a collapse, leaving a 2.9 kilometres (1.8 mi) wide and 5.9 kilometres (3.7 mi) long scar and a deposit at the volcano's foot. Olivine and plagioclase phenocrysts are found in the andesites, the overall SiO_{2} content is 57.6-58.9% in samples from the southern ridge. The volcano probably formed in a short timespan, given the mountainous composition and form. Normal faults have affected the area.

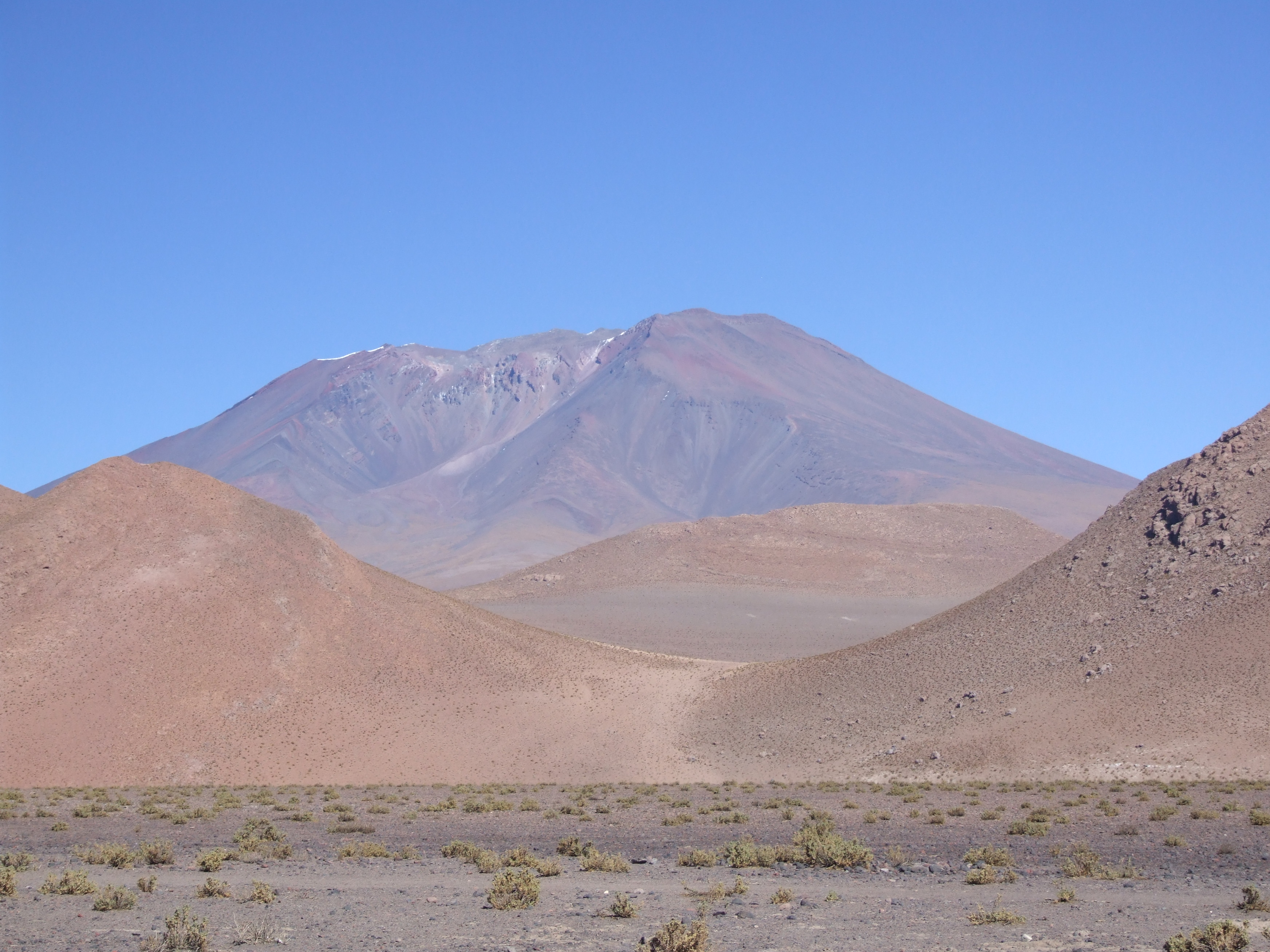
Palpana from the east

The volcano is no more than 1-2 mya old, but there is no evidence of postglacial material and erosion has carved radial ridges into the volcano. Precise dating methods performed on the southeastern flank have found ages of 3.65±0.15 mya and 3.81±0.30 for lavas and scoria. The snowline altitude in the area is 5,900–6,000 metres (19,400–19,700 ft) Four moraine stages are found on the mountain, with the lowest moraines on the southern flank at 4,200 metres (13,800 ft) altitude. Nowadays, block glaciers have been identified in the area, one of which is found at 5,300 metres (17,400 ft). The mountain is also one of the headwaters of the Loa River, and water was transferred from Palpana to Antofagasta by pipeline. A minor vegetation cover of 20-25% of the surface is present.

The mountain is worshipped by pastoralist people who inhabit the surrounding land, and remnants of a sanctuary have been found on its summit.

== See also ==
- Cerro Chela
- Cerro de las Cuevas
- List of mountains in the Andes
- List of Ultras of South America
