= Cerro Chela =

Volcano in Chile

Chela
- Location within Chile

Highest point
- Elevation: 5,644 m (18,517 ft)
- Coordinates: 21°24′S 68°30′W

Geography
- Location: Chile

Chela is a volcano in Chile that was active between 3.75±0.5 and 4.11±0.25 million years ago. It is constructed on top of the 5.4±0.3 million years old rhyolitic Carcote ignimbrite. Its eruption products are mafic andesites.

The volcano was degraded by glaciation but radial ridges and red-gray rocks as well as the uniform slopes indicate that it was a symmetric stratovolcano. The Pleistocene snow line was located at 4,800 metres (15,700 ft) altitude and moraines formed on the northern, western and southern flanks. Perhaps volcanically pre-formed cirques also developed.

Cerro Chela is located south of Aucanquilcha, from which it is separated by the Portezuelo Puquíos. It forms a lineament with Cerro Carcote, Cerro Palpana, Miño Volcano and Volcan Las Cuevas that is oriented north-south.
