= Cerro Cebollar =

Volcano in Chile

Coordinates: 21°37′S 68°28′W

Cerro Cebollar is a 5,716-metre-high (18,753 ft) volcano in Antofagasta Region, Chile including andesitic-dacitic irregular lava flows. They contain 61.7–61.8% SiO_{2}; the volcano itself is a few million years old judging by its appearance. It is covered by a rhyolitic pumice coming from a neighbouring caldera. It is part of the Cerro de las Cuevas-Cerro Palpana volcanic chain.
