= Aucanquilcha =

Stratovolcano in Chile

- Aucaquilcha and Auncanquilcha
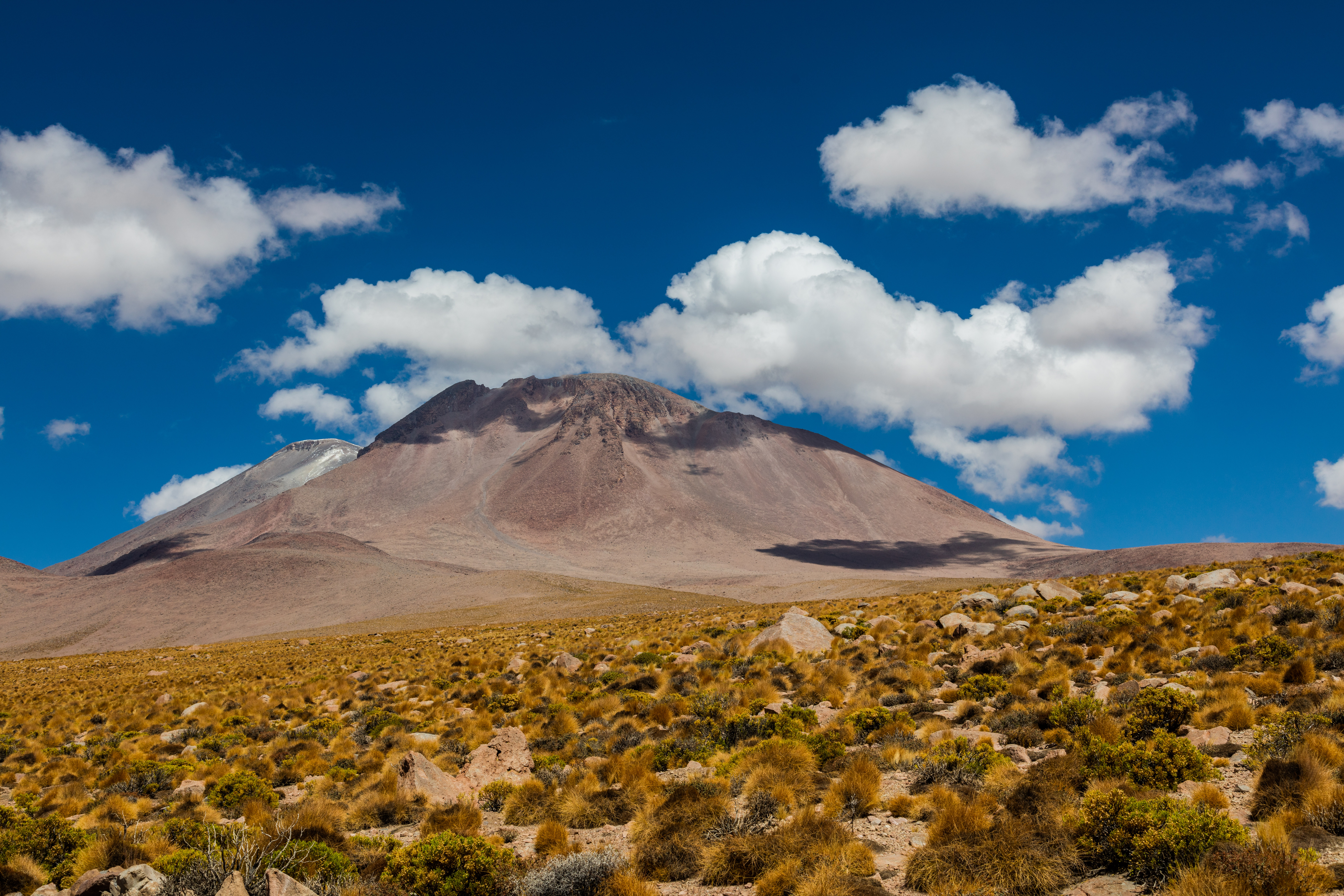
- View of Aucanquilcha volcano from the northwest

Highest point
- Elevation: 6,176 m (20,262 ft)
- Prominence: 2,145 m (7,037 ft)
- Parent peak: Huascaran
- Coordinates: 21°13′15″S 68°28′07″W

Naming
- Etymology: Quechua, although the ending "-che" (Note: In the Aymara language, which shares numerous structural traits with Quechua, "-che" has a causative function.) might be influenced by the Diaguita language: Auqa/aukka; "cruel"/"enemy", kichka/khiska; "spine"; "cruel spine"
- Pronunciation: OW-kahn-KEEL-chuh

Geography
- Location within Chile
- Location: Antofagasta
- Parent range: Andes

Geology
- Rock age: Up to 11 Ma (Late Miocene)
- Mountain type: Stratovolcano
- Rock type: Dacite
- Volcanic zone: Central Volcanic Zone
- Last eruption: 240,000 ± 50,000 years ago (Pleistocene)

Aucanquilcha (Spanish pronunciation: [awkaŋˈkiltʃa]) is a large compound volcano in the Antofagasta Region of northern Chile, within the Central Volcanic Zone of the Andes. The volcano has the form of a ridge reaching an altitude of 6,176 metres (20,262 ft) above sea level, formed between 1.04 and 0.23 million years ago; there is ongoing fumarolic (Note: Fumaroles are gas vents on volcanoes, which release water-containing or wet gases.) activity. The volcano is part of a larger cluster of volcanoes sometimes known as the "Aucanquilcha cluster" or "Aucanquilcha complex". This cluster includes lava domes and lava flows that have formed in several stages over 11 million years of activity with varying magma output. During the ice ages, Aucanquilcha was covered in an ice cap that left moraines and cirques.

The cluster has generated lava ranging in composition from andesite to dacite; the main Aucanquilcha volcano has produced dacites exclusively. Systematic variations in temperature, crystal and biotite content have been recorded during the evolution of the cluster. They reflect the change of the magma supply conduits in the crust from dispersed magma chambers to a centralized volcanic system.

One mine at an altitude of 5,950 m (19,520 ft) was opened in 1913 and remained in use from 1950 to 1992, constituting at that time the world's highest mine. It exploited the sulfur deposits in the mountain's summit area. As part of this mining activity, a road and an aerial cableway were built on Aucanquilcha, and still stand although they are partially unusable. In 1986, four men were reported to be living at an altitude of 5,900 m (19,400 ft), making them the highest permanent residents on Earth, drawing scientific attention.

== Geography and geomorphology ==
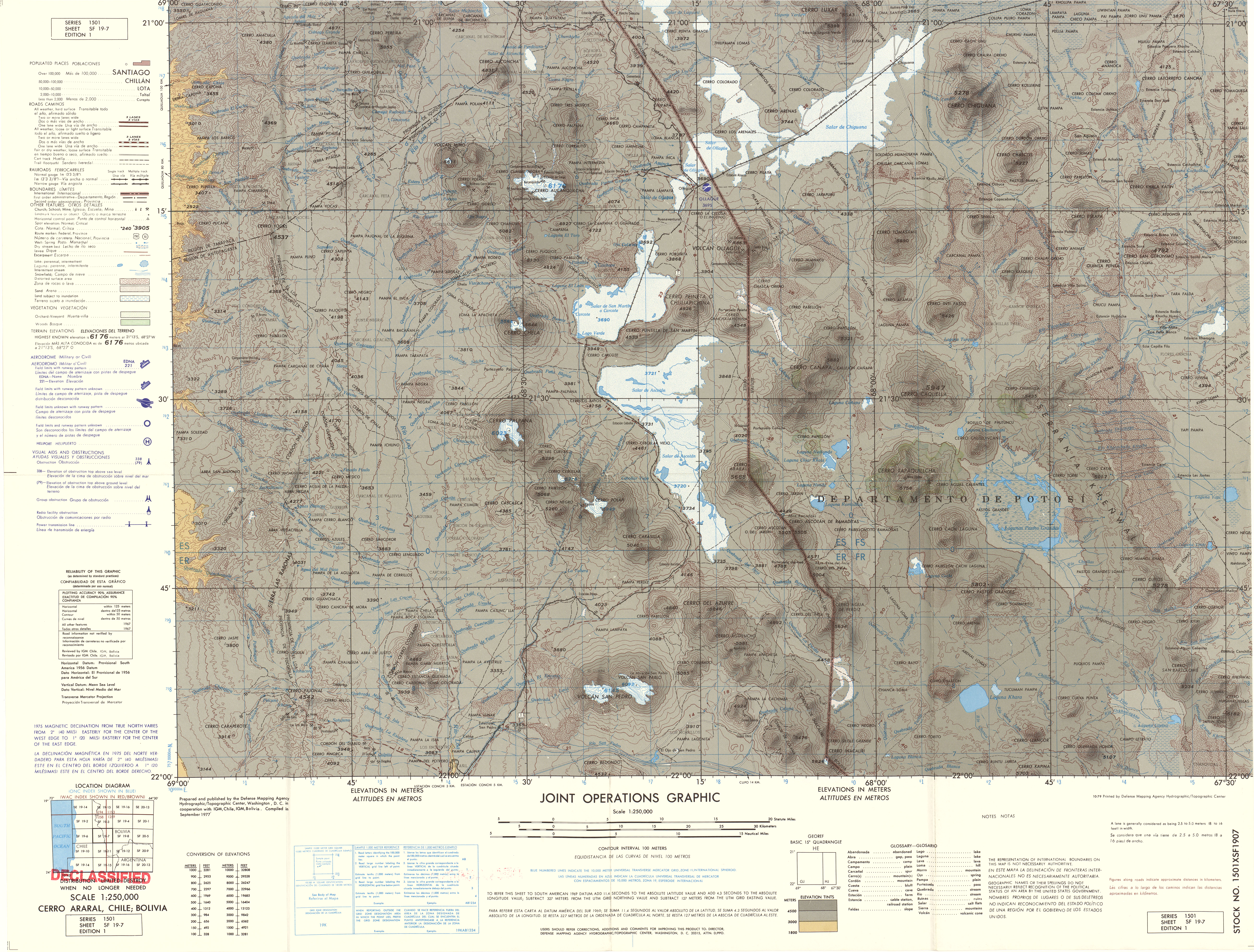
Topographic map of the Aucanquilcha region (the volcano is in the upper left corner)

Aucanquilcha is a compound volcano in the El Loa Province of Chile's Antofagasta Region. Roads and railways, including a branch line of the Antofagasta-Bolivia railway going to the Collahuasi mine, pass near the volcano. A road with many switchbacks leads up to the Aucanquilcha mine; it was built in 1972 and is now impassable because of rock falls, and might have made the mine on Aucanquilcha the highest point on Earth accessible by road. The mountain was evaluated as a potential site for the European Southern Observatory and its surroundings for the Submillimeter Array observatory.

The main volcano is composed of an east–west 8 km long chain of at least six stratovolcanoes, some with well-preserved volcanic craters, that rise 1.4 kilometres (4,600 ft) above a platform of andesitic rocks. The mountains are formed by about 37 km^{3} (Note: There are smaller estimates) of lava domes and pyroclastic rocks, making it one of the largest volcanoes of northern Chile. Four peaks (Note: The maximum slope of the summit area is 25°.) exceed altitudes of 6,000 m (20,000 ft); at the end of a ridge is the highest peak, reaching 6,176 m (20,262 ft) (Note: Sometimes called Ponte del Cerro. Some sources have different altitudes, e.g 6190 m) above sea level. It is the summit of the Aucanquilcha volcano, one can see the Salar de Uyuni and other Andean volcanoes from there. Lava flows extend mostly from the summit areas as far as 2–3 km (1.2–1.9 mi) from their vents; they are dark to grey in colour. It is likely that two small lava domes (Cerro Cumbre Negra and Summit 5867) on the northwest flank occupy flank vents. To the north lies the 3.3 million-year-old andesite Cerro Tres Monos ridge; to the west lies the east-west Cerro Polan and La Luna ridge.

Aucanquilcha collapsed to the northwest, forming a 1 km^{3} (0.24 cu mi) debris avalanche that descended 2,100 m (6,900 ft) and ran for 17 km (11 mi) to the northwest and north. It eventually formed a tongue-shaped deposit covering an area of 59 km^{2}. The flow was channeled between Miño Volcano and Cerro Cumbre Negra towards the dry Rio Loa valley, which helped to preserve the slide deposit. The slide lacks the hummocky topography usually found on debris avalanches but has radial ridges and grooves and lateral levees; its upper sector is buried by more recent volcanic rocks and moraines. Another landslide occurred during the Redondo stage on the eastern side of the main volcano into the Salar de Carcote. It has the classic hummocky topography of landslides and covers a length of 17 km and a surface area of 35 km^{2} (14 sq mi); this is roughly half of the surface area of the Mount St Helens avalanche of 1980 and one-third of the surface area of the Ollagüe avalanche. A volume of 0.35 km^{3} is assumed based on a probable thickness of 10 m (33 ft).

There are anecdotal reports of crater lakes on the mountain, and lake El Toro on its southern foot. Some of the source creeks and springs of the Rio Loa are on Aucanquilcha, forming its headwaters when they converge in Lago Seco. The Loa drains the western and northwestern sides of the volcano; the eastern side drains into the Salar de Ollagüe salt pan, the northeastern into the Salar de Laguani, and the southeastern into the Salar de Carcote. Most valleys (Note: The Rio Blanco, Rio Casicsa, Rio Chela and Quebrada de Chaigüire valleys originate at the foot of Aucanquilcha.) only intermittently transport water, if at all.

The volcano is part of a quasi-circular cluster of about 19–20 volcanoes between the Rio Loa and the Chile–Bolivia border, covering a surface area of 700 km^{2} (270 sq mi). Salt flats and alluvial deposits surround it to the east, north and west. On its southern side is the Cerro Chela volcano. The cluster lies on 70 km (43 mi) thick crust, and arid conditions since the Miocene have preserved its structures. Its volcanoes are arranged in north–south and northwestern alignments, which may indicate a rupture of the crust above shallow magma reservoirs.

== Geology ==
Off the western coast of South America, the Nazca Plate subducts beneath the South America Plate at a rate of 7 cm/year. As it descends, it releases fluids into the mantle that induce its melting and the onset of volcanism at the surface. This volcanism of the Andean Volcanic Belt is distributed over four arcs, including the Northern Volcanic Zone (NVZ), the Central Volcanic Zone (CVZ) and Southern Volcanic Zone (SVZ), which are separated by gaps without volcanic activity. Aucanquilcha is part of the CVZ, which contains more than a thousand volcanoes (including ignimbrites and compound volcanoes). During the past 28 million years, it has produced more than 3000 km^{3} of eruption products; the average rate of 0.11 km^{3}/ka is one tenth of the global maximum rate of arc magma production. Rocks are typically silicic or have intermediate compositions between silicic and mafic. (Note: A volcanic rock relatively rich in iron and magnesium, relative to silicium.) The arc has migrated eastward towards the high Andes from the Pacific Ocean coast since the Jurassic and has been producing ignimbrites and stratovolcanoes since the Miocene. The arc features an eastward offset at the latitude of Aucanquilcha. Lascar is the most active volcano of the CVZ, having erupted more than thirty times since 1800; other active volcanoes of the CVZ include Taapaca, Parinacota, Irruputuncu, Ollagüe, San Pedro, Socompa and Lastarria.

The crust under the CVZ reaches high thicknesses exceeding 60–70 km (37–43 mi), leading to widespread contamination of ascending magmas. The basement of the Central Andes consists of volcanic rocks and marine sediments from the Mesozoic, and volcanic and volcano-sedimentary rocks from the Cenozoic; they overlie metamorphic rocks and amphibolite of the lower crust. The offset in the volcanic arc coincides with a boundary between two distinct crustal domains to the north and south in the Arequipa-Antofalla terrane. A fracture in the crust under Aucanquilcha might be responsible both for its elongated shape and the dominance of effusive eruptions (as it would facilitate degassing). Seismic and electric tomography indicate the presence of a hot zone in the crust, which may be a developing batholith (Note: A batholith is a very large scale mass of volcanic or intrusive rock within a different rock.).

The Aucanquilcha complex lies northwest of the Altiplano–Puna volcanic complex (APVC), a local large igneous province. The APVC is underpinned below at a depth of 20 km (12 mi) by a slow seismic velocity zone that has been linked to the presence of 15–25% of partial melts in the zone. The Aucanquilcha complex is much smaller volumetrically than the APVC ignimbrites, but the duration of activity and the location indicate that Aucanquilcha is a subcomponent of the APVC complex. The volcano might be a surface manifestation of copper porphyry deposits and a batholith-plutonic complex resembling the Tuolumne Intrusive Suite of the Sierra Nevada.

=== Composition ===
The rocks from the main Aucanquilcha volcano are uniformly dacitic and show little evidence of composition changes over time. The Aucanquilcha complex produced both andesite and dacite. Andesites appear as lava flows whereas dacites form lava domes and dome complexes. The rocks define a calc-alkaline suite rich in potassium (content ranges 1.5–4%), typical for Central Andean volcanoes and subduction zone volcanoes in general. Plagioclase is the dominant component of the magma. Clinopyroxene + orthopyroxene + amphibole (hornblende and pargasite) or amphibole + biotite + minor amounts of pyroxene are subordinate components. Anhydrite, apatite, ilmenite, magnetite and zircon can also be found. Rocks have a porphyritic texture and the more recent (last 1 million years) rocks contain inclusions of mafic rocks. Basaltic andesites typically are less than 10% crystals whereas dacites generally are more than 20% crystals. The Alconcha group lavas form two distinct families: Early lavas are crystal-poor and lack biotite, later rocks contain biotite and more crystals. There is evidence of magma mixing and mingling, and of multiple generations of crystals being extracted from the magma reservoir especially during inactive periods. The magmas form at 5–20 km (3.1–12 mi) depth.

Several parts of the main volcano have been subjected to hydrothermal and fumarolic alteration, especially the central parts of the complex and the Azufrera stage edifice. Hydrothermal alteration may be driven by the formation of a deep magma reservoir and resulting hydrothermal circulation in overlying rocks. The summit area and the area between the Azufrera and Angulo complex feature talus deposits containing sulfur, which formed at temperatures of 450 °C in a now extinct fumarole. Some of the sulfur may have been emplaced in liquid form. The geologist Friedrich Ahlfeld in a 1947 publication reported ongoing formation of sulfur crystals in a cave on the summit. Pyrite and hypogene-derived copper sulfides such as covellite and idaite occur on Aucanquilcha in the sulfur deposits, cementing volcanic rocks. The copper sulfides found in the area appear to have formed through postvolcanic epithermal mineralization above deep porphyry copper mineralization, and before the sulfur deposits.

=== Magma output and evolution ===
The surrounding Aucanquilcha complex had a fairly stable magma output between 12 and 6 million years ago, followed by an increase that peaked between 4 and 1 million years ago (with a possible hiatus between 2 and 1 million years ago). The long-term magma output of Aucanquilcha itself is comparable to the magma output of other long-term active volcanoes in the central Andes such as Ollagüe and Llullaillaco. In all such cases, an early peak in magma output is followed by later lower-volume activity (0.1 to 0.2 km^{3}/ka, followed by 0.01 to 0.02 km^{3}/ka). Mount Unzen in Japan and Mount Duff and Lassen Peak in California have similar eruption histories. Such decreases may occur because of the lithostatic load imposed by the edifices on the magma chambers and the increased travel distance of the magma through the edifice. The low output of Aucanquilcha relative to other volcanoes in the region might reflect the fact that it is located at the edge of the Altiplano–Puna volcanic complex, and might explain why no major caldera-forming eruption ever took place.

The repeated formation of magma chambers heated the crust under the volcano, warming the magmatic system. This crustal feedback and increased deep crustal influx of mantle-derived basalts drove increased magma production, and ephemeral shallow magma chambers formed which were supplied from the deeper reservoir. Eruption rates and hydrothermal activity increased, and crystal populations in the magmatic system shifted. Four million years ago the magmatic system became centralized and stable, allowing the continuous production of dacitic magmas. Under the volcano, dacite built a barrier that prevented the ascent of denser magmas. Accordingly, the central volcanos erupted dacites; andesite was confined to the peripheral Miño Volcano. The Aucanquilcha volcanic complex has been interpreted as the surface component of a developing pluton.

Crustal rocks were absorbed in the magma, especially the more evolved (dacitic) ones and during declining stages. Magma and included crystals were drawn from depths of 3 to 23 km during the main Aucanquilcha stage of volcanism, with evidence of stronger crustal contributions or of a change of their composition. Based on geothermometric data, the highest temperatures occurred during phases of high activity and lower temperatures are associated with low output periods.

== Eruptive history ==
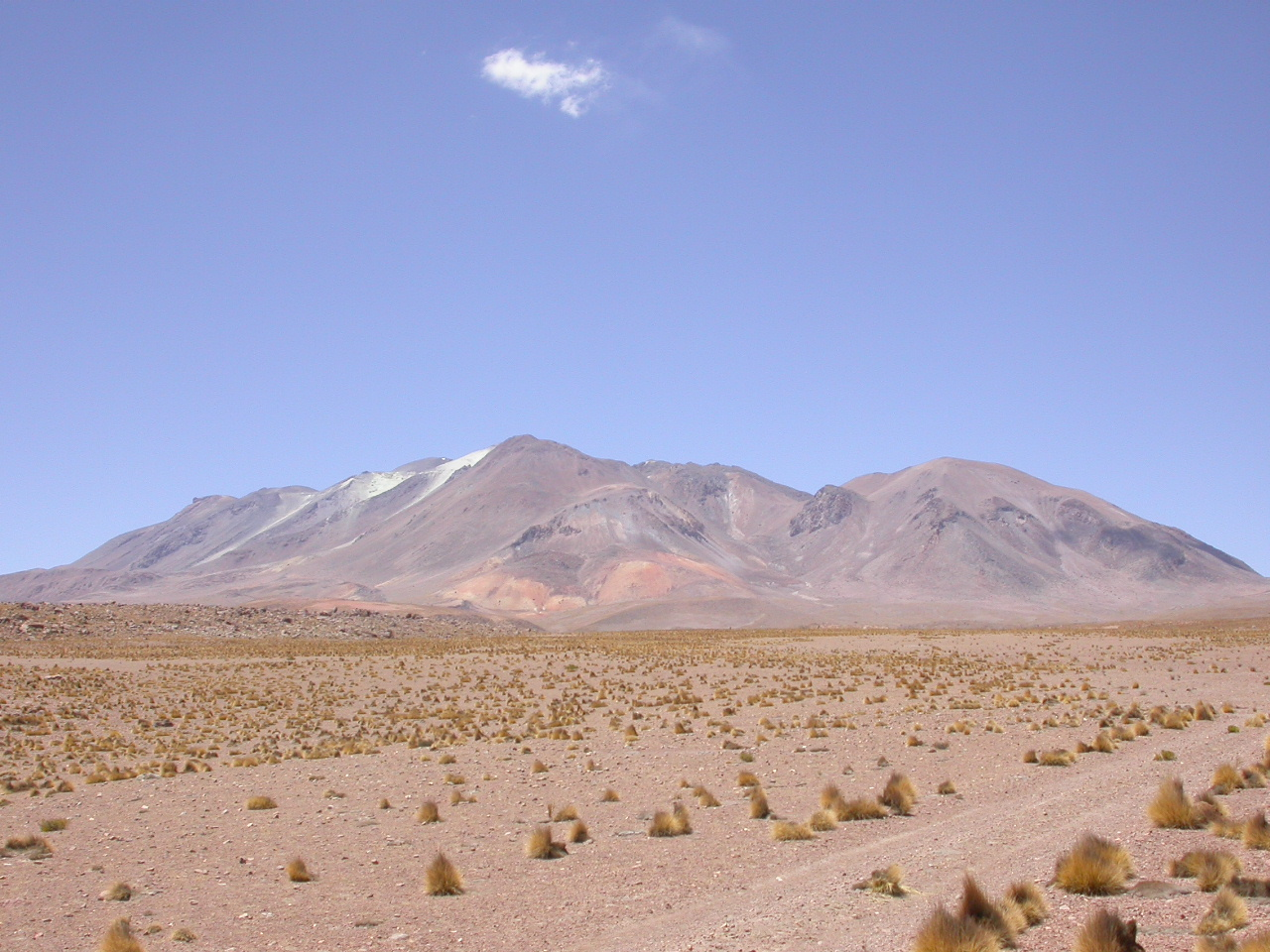
Aucanquilcha

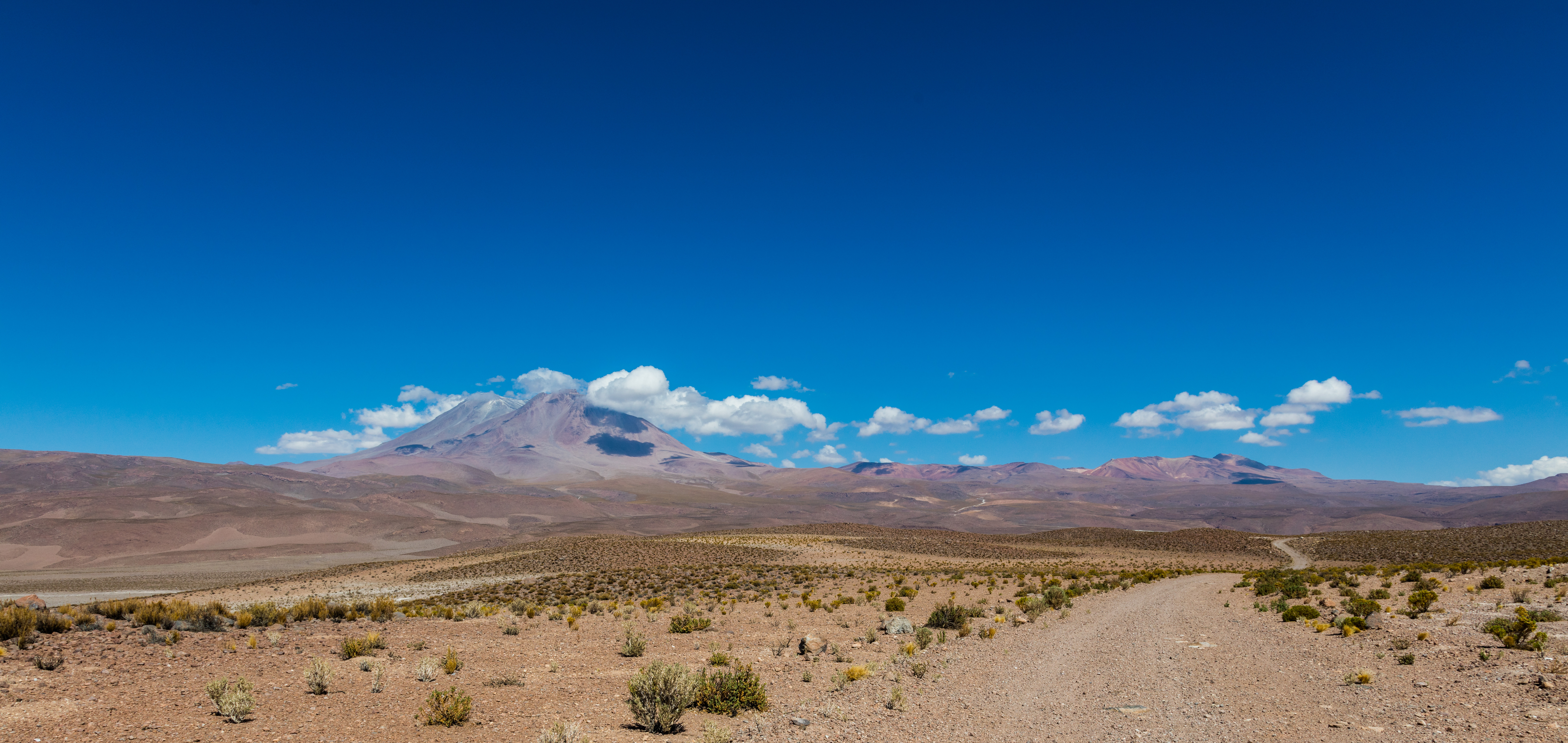
Landscape view

Volcanic activity of the Aucanquilcha cluster commenced 11 million years ago. From 6–5 million years ago, activity increased, and at the same time the magmas became more uniform in composition and strong hydrothermal alteration commenced. The Aucanquilcha cluster generated about 340±20 km^{3} of volcanic rock, with each centre being active for a few hundred thousand years. Over time, centres became less distributed and their magmas more uniform. Activity waned 2–1 million years ago: the Aucanquilcha volcano proper may be a waning stage of the overall cluster. Both the timing and the duration of volcanic activity of the Aucanquilcha cluster are comparable to that of the Altiplano–Puna volcanic complex.

Aucanquilcha itself began erupting about 1 million years ago, producing mostly lava flows with little variation in eruption style and with a prolonged decline after an initial phase of high output. Eruptions occurred every 50,000–100,000 years, with breaks as long as 250,000 years. The age of the lava flows ranges from heavily glaciated flows underlying less-eroded ones to possibly postglacial lava flows that may be tens of thousands of years old. The site of volcanic activity has migrated over time.

=== Stages of the Aucanquilcha complex ===
Both the Aucanquilcha cluster and Aucanquilcha proper formed in four stages each:

- The Alconcha group, with seven volcanoes, is constructed from andesite and dacite that was erupted 11–8 million years ago. It consists of two northern composite cones, Alconcha and Volcan Tuco (also known as Cerro Garage, dated 10.96–10.51 million years), and five lava domes on the northeastern side of the cluster. Alconcha has a large breach on the southern side of its crater that is likely the product of a flank collapse but the avalanche deposit may be buried beneath younger material. Lavas within the breach are dated 10.78–10.43 million years. The centres of Volcan Tuco and Alconcha are heavily eroded, and Alconcha's lavas and scoria lie on top of Tuco. The dacitic Ujina ignimbrite was erupted 9.4 million years ago from an unknown vent and has a volume of 2 km^{3}. Although the vent location is unknown, the composition of the ignimbrite, and its dating and distribution, indicate an association with this group. The domes are poorly researched; the Coscalito dome is dated 8.9–8.7 million years old and Cerro Amincha 8.01. The total volume of this group is 46 km^{3}, indicating a flux rate of 0.013 km^{3}/ka.
- The Gordo group, which erupted 6–4 million years ago following a probable 2-million-year hiatus, is located in the southern and western parts of the cluster. Cerro Gordo itself (5.49 million years) has a crater breached to the west, exposing about twelve radial dykes but with no trace of a debris avalanche. One of the larger centres of the cluster, Gordo is associated with a lava field on its western side that is dated 4.9 million years old. Cerro Puquíos and Cerro Negro (5.81–5.28 million years old) lie on the southern side of the cluster, and glacial cirques cutting their northeastern flanks reveal layers of scoria and lavas. Puquíos has an amphitheatre structure on its western side. Paco Paco (4.41–4.27 million years old) is located north of most Gordo group volcanoes. It forms a 4 km wide stratocone with a lava-filled crater, and layers of scoria and agglutinated lavas dip from it. Volcan Pabellón (4.14–4.12 million years old) sits southwest of the Puquíos-Negro ridge. The Las Bolitas lava field (5.23–5.13 million years old) is associated with the Gordo group but the locations of its vents are unknown. The total volume of the Alconcha group is 55 km^{3}, indicating a flux rate of 0.027 km^{3}/ka.
- The 3.6–2.3 million-year-old Polan group is the largest group in the cluster. It includes ten dispersed volcanoes, such as Tres Monos, La Luna, Cerro Polan, Chaihuiri, Miño Volcano and the lavas of the Aucanquilcha platform. Cerro Polan's (3.5–3 million years) eastern side is deeply dissected, and the exposed materials are heavily altered in the deeper sections. Lava fields to Polan's west and southwest (2.6 million years on one western field) are associated with it. La Luna (2.97–2.57 million years old) lies just east of Polan; these two mountains were probably one volcano in the past. La Luna has a lava dome surrounded by a glaciated but unaltered lava table. Cerro Tres Monos (3.4–2.78 million years old) forms a northbound 14 km long ridge with at least six vents. Hydrothermal alteration has affected some lavas and pyroclastics from Tres Monos, and the western side has lateral and terminal moraines. The Aucanquilcha platform (3.6–2.7 million years old) sits underneath the main Aucanquilcha volcano, and its lava mostly flowed north. Its southern side is a 4500 m table with one hill, Cerro Campana, dated to 3.3 million years ago. The platform presumably forms one third of the total volume of the Aucanquilcha cluster and may have originated from a part of the ridge of the La Luna-Polan trend, now buried beneath Aucanquilcha. Chaihuiri (2.39 million years) is a lava dome with moraines and two short lava flows; it is the youngest Polan group volcano. The total volume of this group is 154 km^{3}, indicating a flux rate of 0.077 km^{3}/ka.

==== Stages of the main Aucanquilcha volcano ====
- The main Aucanquilcha volcano is the youngest volcano in the cluster and formed in four stages:
  - Between 1.04 and 0.92 million years during the Azufrera stage, the bulk of the volcano formed. A vent at 6116 m altitude fed most of this edifice; a second vent on the northern flank at the 5887 m summit generated three lava flows, two shorter ones and a long one to the northwest. One lava flow toward the southwest is unusually long, at 6 km. The Azufrera stage lavas are blocky dacites with large clasts and flow fronts up to 20 m high. These flows are moderately altered and have oxidation rinds. There is little evidence of explosive activity, but it may have been obscured by glacial erosion. The total volume is 21.1 km^{3}, indicating a flux rate of 0.16 km^{3}/ka. This volcano was probably an isolated cone, but the existence of a previous stage cannot be excluded.
  - The second stage, named Rodado, lasted from 0.95 to 0.85 million years ago. It formed on the eastern slopes of the Azufrera volcano, with one vent at the 6073 m summit. Rodado stage lavas are blocky, platy and usually thicker than the Azufrera stage lavas. Some of the summit vent lavas are among the most vesicular of this stage. They are also less weathered (oxidation rinds are c. 1 cm thick) and less subject to solfataric alteration. The Cerro Chinchillas lavas are the oldest of this stage; erupted from an unknown vent, they lack amphiboles. The total volume is 9.1 km^{3}, indicating a flux rate of 0.09 km^{3}/ka. A flank collapse, possibly triggered by a large earthquake, occurred during this stage.
  - The third stage is the Cumbre Negra stage, named after the westernmost summit and principal vent of this stage, Cerro Cumbre Negra (5670 m). The timing of its activity is less defined than the previous two stages; it may have occurred between 1 and 0.47 million years ago, but most likely 0.6–0.5 million years ago based on potassium–argon dating. Four lava flows issued from the main vent, all of which are less than one kilometre long and 40–60 m thicker than those produced during previous stages. They all have hydration rinds but no native sulfur deposits. This stage generated Aucanquilcha's only pyroclastic flow (Note: During the Cumbre Negra stage, a pyroclastic flow occurred on the northwestern side of the volcano. It covered 34 km^{2} on a run of 10 km^{2} and now has a volume of 0.3 km^{3}. It was at first identified as a debris avalanche, but the lack of hummocky topography and the presence of large juvenile blocks identify it as a pyroclastic flow. The process through which it formed has been compared to the eruptions of Indonesia's Mount Merapi. One block in the flow and the lava dome from which the flow originated have been dated at 0.6 million years.) during a lava dome collapse. The total volume of this stage is 0.7 km^{3}, indicating a flux rate of 0.005 km^{3}/ka.
  - The youngest stage, known as Angulo, lasted from 0.66 to 0.2–0.23 million years ago. It took place between the Azufrera and Rodado stage edifices, on a 1 km long ridge that includes Aucanquilcha's highest summit and which became the source of most of the Angulo lava flows. One crater on the northeast side of the ridge fed lavas to the north. Other than that, most flows extend southwards 4 to 9 km from the vent, and with the exception of a due south flow 50 m thick they are thin, with thicknesses of 15–20 m. One of the oldest flows has been compared in length to the 50% longer Chao Dacite flow but is much thinner. The flows from this stage are weakly weathered and partially overlie glacial deposits. The total volume is 5.8 km^{3}, indicating a flux rate of 0.015 km^{3}/ka.

=== Last activity, fumaroles and hazards ===
The last dated eruption occurred 450,000 ± 70,000 years ago. Some scoria cones of basaltic composition, including Poruñita and Luna de Tierra, formed between Aucanquilcha and Ollagüe after Aucanquilcha's last activity. There is no clear evidence of Holocene activity, except possibly for lava flows overlying moraines, and there are no known historical eruptions or ongoing ground deformation. There are active fumaroles or hot ground, most conspicuous in the trenches dug during sulfur mining operations. (Note: Sources disagree on whether their thermal anomalies are visible from space or not.) The emitted gases in 1947 had temperatures of 60–85 °C; an 1988 source described them as "low temperature fumaroles" without giving exact values.

The Chilean geological agency SERNAGEOMIN considers Aucanquilcha a low hazard volcano, ranking it 71st (Note: The ranking has varied over time: In 2019 it was 70th out of 92 Chilean volcanoes and 73rd out of 91 in 2014.) out of 87 volcanoes as of 2023. As of 2021 Aucanquilcha was not monitored. Ice and snow avalanches, lava flow emissions and minor explosive activity, confined to the edifice of the volcano, are the most important risks from renewed activity, and a hazard map has been published. There are signs that warn of volcanic danger in the area.

== Climate and vegetation ==
Temperatures at the summit are usually below freezing, (Note: In 1963 the temperature at the summit of Aucanquilcha was about −8 °C.) but owing to the thin atmosphere at this altitude insolation is among the highest on Earth's surface and can cause sunburns. Mean annual precipitation at Aucanquilcha is unknown, but it did not exceed 100 mm per year at Ollagüe in 1963. It occurs mostly during summer as the so-called Bolivian winter. Aridity has prevailed here since the Miocene but with short-term fluctuations, a more humid period between 14,000 and 9,500 years ago and a drier period between 9,000 and 4,000 years ago for example. The summit region is windy and can experience snowstorms, and seasonal snow cover can reach a substantial thickness.

Three distinct vegetation belts occur in the region. The aridity prevents plant growth below 3,100 m (10,200 ft) altitude, but a sparse cover of Acantholippia punensis exists above this. Between 3,750 and 3,300 m (12,300 and 10,830 ft) vegetation is denser, featuring Baccharis boliviensi and Fabiana densa. A more diverse plant community is found between 4100 and 3750 m, consisting of bushes and grasses. Species there include Azorella compacta, Festuca chrysophylla, Pycnophyllum and Stipa venusta. The occurrence of Polylepis has been reported. The exact vegetation structure depends on the availability of water. Vegetation cover ends at about 4,900 m (16,100 ft). Mice have been found around 4500 m; regional mice populations are known to reach extreme altitudes.

=== Glaciation ===
There is some snow and ice on the mountains, as well as rock glaciers between 5,200 and 5,500 m (17,100 and 18,000 ft); permafrost occurs down to 4385 m altitude. With the exception of one 1999 report sources agree that there are no active glaciers on Aucanquilcha as the climate is too dry for glacier development despite the low temperature.

During glacials an ice cap covered the volcano, leaving cirques, glacial striations and extensive moraines on both the main volcano (Note: The western Azufrera edifice was heavily glaciated in the past. At least three moraine stages have been mapped on that edifice, and on its southern side is found a modest cirque with glacially polished lavas on the floor. The Rodado stage edifice has several moraine stages on its southern slopes. Another small cirque with a moraine has been found in the northeastern side of the Cerro Cumbre Negra summit next to an Azufrera stage lava flow. A small moraine lies on the south side of the Angulo edifice; some lavas from that edifice overlie glacial deposits.) and its subsidiaries. At its maximum extent, it covered an area of at least 45 km^{2} (17 sq mi). The exact altitude of the ice edge ranged between 4,500 and 5,200 m (14,800 and 17,100 ft) (Note: Identical to the altitude of the cirques.) with lower altitudes reached on the eastern and southeastern side. At least two distinct glacier stages took place. The development of glaciers in the region was probably a consequence of a wetter climate.

== Human activity and mining ==
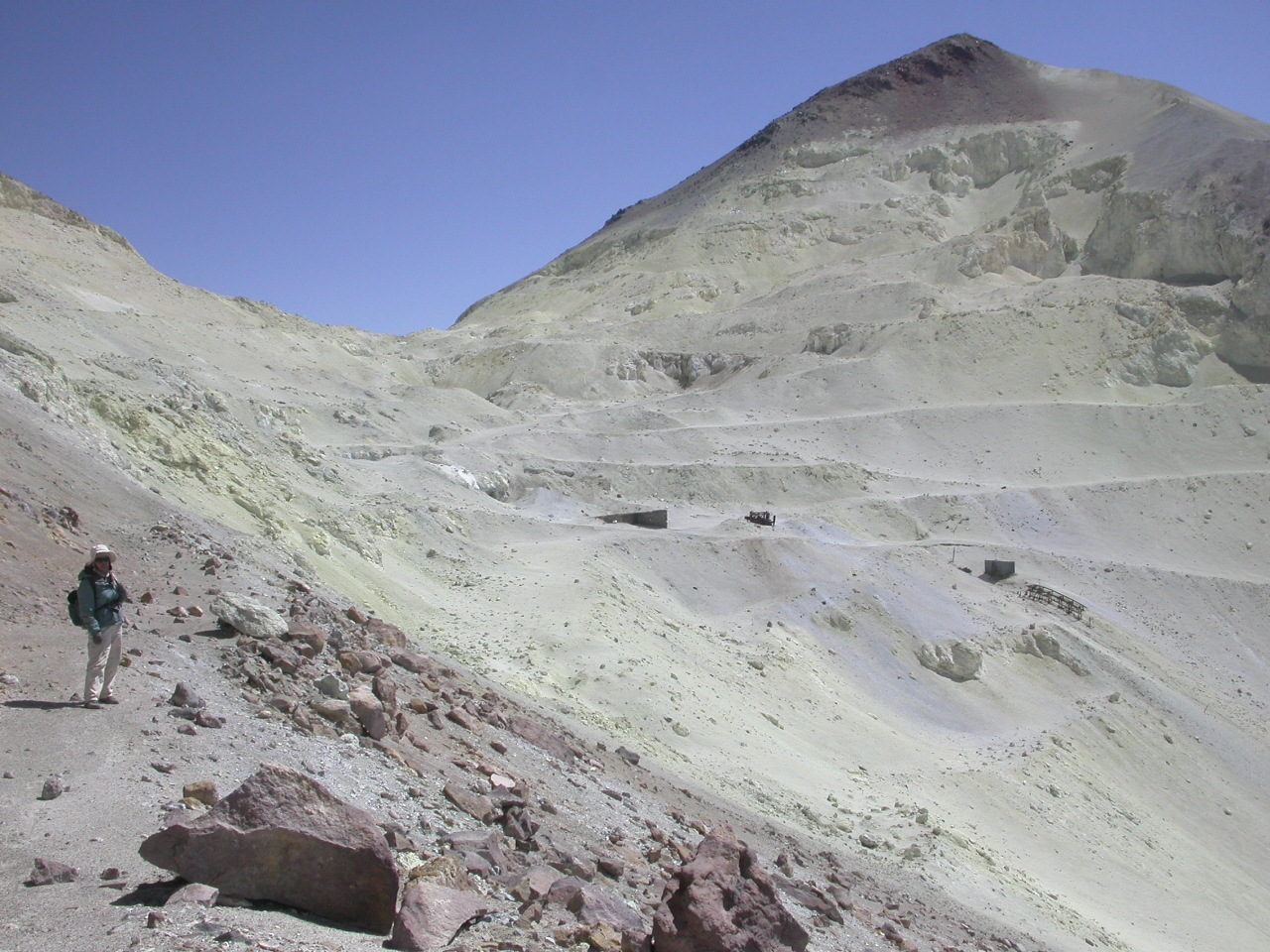
A sulfur mine on Aucanquilcha

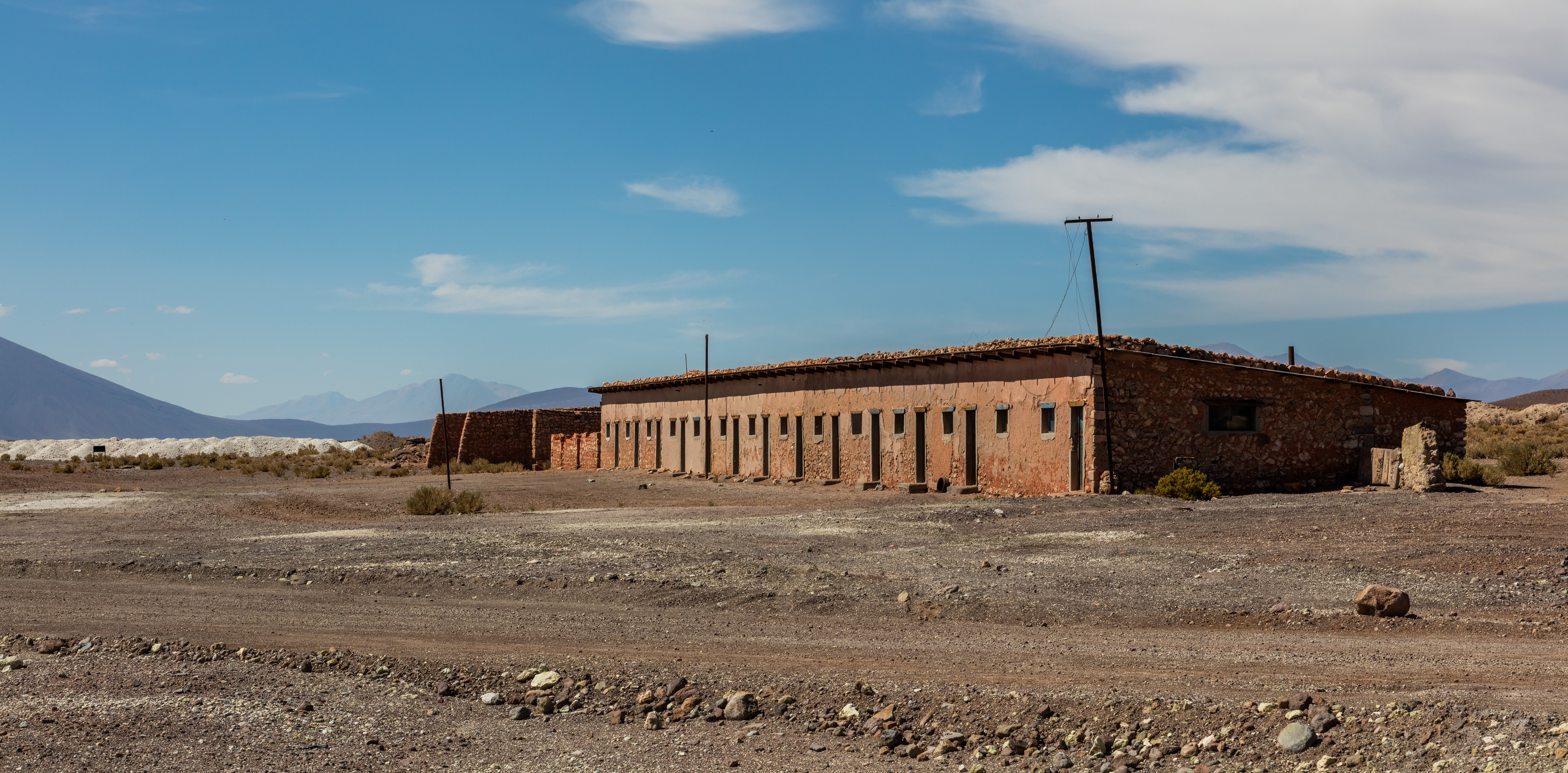
Aucanquilcha camp

A mine at 5950 m altitude on Aucanquilcha is famous for being the highest mine in the world (Note: The runner-up might have been the Ganesh Himal mine in the Himalayas.). It produced sulfur ore with an ore grade of 30% deposited by fumaroles in the area of hydrothermally altered rocks around the summit. The mine was opened in 1913 by Julian B. Carrasco, who subsequently established the Compañía Minera y Azufrera Carrasco S.A in 1933, in Ollagüe, moving to Amincha in 1950. In 1942, the mine produced about 180 tons of ore per day, in 1953 annual production was 12,000 tons and in 1974 an annual production of 33,000 tons was reported. The sulfur was transported down first with llamas, later by trucks and eventually through an aerial cableway system from Quilcha/Quilca/El Ángulo to Amincha station (3900 m) where the sulfur was refined. There are anecdotal reports of a railway. The sulfur was then transported to Chuquicamata to be converted into sulfuric acid or to Antofagasta to be shipped; the Antofagasta–Bolivia railway was essential for the sulfur mining in the Ollagüe area. In 1977 other sulfur mines were present to the west between Cerro Polan and Cerro Gordo and south of the main Aucanquilcha massif, and another camp (Polan) is marked on modern maps west-southwest of Aucanquilcha. Neighbouring volcanoes were also mined.

In 1935, mining took place throughout the year but typical workhours were only about 8 hours per day owing to the conditions. Owing to the extreme conditions, sulfur from the mines in the Ollagüe area was only rarely competitive on global markets. After an initial crisis in the 1950s, sulfur mining began to decline in the Ollagüe region during the 1970s; during the 1980s–1990s the worker camps were abandoned. Amincha was closed in 1992 or 1993, and the last reported mining activity on the mountain was in 1993 or 1994. The cessation of sulfur production in Chile during the 1990s was due to imported sulfur being cheaper and of higher quality. The mines and adjacent infrastructure were investigated beginning in 2015 as part of the Alto Cielo Archaeological Project and there has been research on the living conditions and ethnic relations between Bolivian and Chilean workers in the region.

There are still ruins of the cableway, a relic network of roads leading up to 5900 m as well as ruins of the Amincha and El Ángulo stations. Apart from mining activity, an Inca mountain sanctuary with offerings of llamas has been reported to exist on Aucanquilcha. Such Inca findings are common on mountaintops of the region. Other archaeological sites are found around the volcano, including the Inca road Qhapaq Ñan, and there might have been copper mining at Miño.

The inhabitants of Ollagüe viewed Aucanquilcha as the devil's mountain and nicknamed it El Rebelde. Its masculine nature (reflecting the hard work of mining) was contrasted to the female, more ambiguous, interpretation of Ollagüe volcano. Anecdotal reports indicate that mine workers presented offerings to the mountain to secure a high mine yield. According to a local folktale, when the Spaniards attempted to rename the mountain to San José, it resisted as it had been named by the goddess Pachamama. It occasionally threw sulfur and killed miners on the mountain.

=== Altitude and habitation ===
Just below the mine was formerly (Note: Sites at comparable elevation include Indian Army outposts in the Himalayas; some outposts at the Siachen Glacier might be at an even higher altitude.) the highest permanently inhabited place on Earth in the form of a galvanized iron hut. In 1986, several caretakers lived there, including Justo Copa who had been living there for two years; (Note: Although the caretakers occasionally descended from Aucanquilcha to lower altitudes.) they were the highest (Note: An expedition in 1935, part of the International High Altitude Expedition, found that 150 miners lived at an altitude of 5,300 metres (17,500 ft) in Quilcha and reached the higher mine on foot. The expedition found that an even higher abandoned village at 5639 m existed, but miners refused to live there. The conclusion taken from the expedition was that 5334 m was the highest habitable altitude but later investigations recognized that the caretakers lived at higher altitudes.) human inhabitants on Earth.

With increasing altitude, atmospheric pressure decreases and with it the availability of oxygen for breathing, eventually leading to altitude sickness. Aucanquilcha has been used for studies on the effects of high altitude on human behaviour and medical parameters. They indicated that the Aymara miners were fully acclimatized to the altitude, with less hyperventilation and higher hemoglobin than acclimatized people from lower areas. They are more tolerant of the high altitude than the researchers who studied them in 1942, although some European workers also managed to tolerate the environment. Their families are born and raised at lower altitudes, (Note: The highest known town with families is La Rinconada in Peru.) although they could handle the high altitude conditions as well. Only a small fraction of the mineworkers could live on Aucanquilcha for longer timespans, leading to a frequent turnover in personnel and frequent sickness and mortality.

== See also ==
- List of volcanoes in Chile
