= Cerro de las Cuevas =

Mountain in Chile

Coordinates: 21°35′S 68°29′W

Cerro de las Cuevas is a 5,294-metre-high (17,369 ft) volcano in the Andes.

The volcano is formed by thick lava flows that surround a lava dome. A spatter cone is also found on the northeastern flank of the volcano.

The volcano is made of andesite. Lava flows contain clinopyroxene, olivine and quartz, the latter in the form of xenocrysts; rocks on the spatter cone are aphyric.

A line of volcanoes extends from Cerro Cebollar to Cerro Palpana in south–north direction, of which Cerro de las Cuevas is the youngest volcano. Potassium-argon dating of the spatter cone on the northeastern flank of the volcano has yielded ages of 3.15±0.15 and 3.36±0.13 million before present.
