= Miño Volcano =

Mountain in Chile

Miño

Highest point
- Elevation: 5,661 m (18,573 ft)
- Coordinates: 21°11′S 68°36′W

Geography
- Location: Chile
- Parent range: Andes

Geology
- Mountain type: Stratovolcano

Miño Volcano is a symmetrical cone-shaped stratovolcano located in El Loa Province, Antofagasta Region, Chile. It lies a few kilometres northwest of Aucanquilcha volcano and at its foot originates Loa River. The major settlement in its vicinity is Ollagüe at the border with Bolivia. The volcano has erupted mafic andesite. Potassium-argon dating has yielded ages of 3.59±0.11 and 3.27±0.40 million years ago for Miño. This volcano is usually considered part of Aucanquilcha, and lava flows appear to originate from the summit.

Unlike many other high summits in the area, there is no evidence of a pre-Columbian ascent to its summit.
