= Cerro del Azufre =

Mountain in Chile

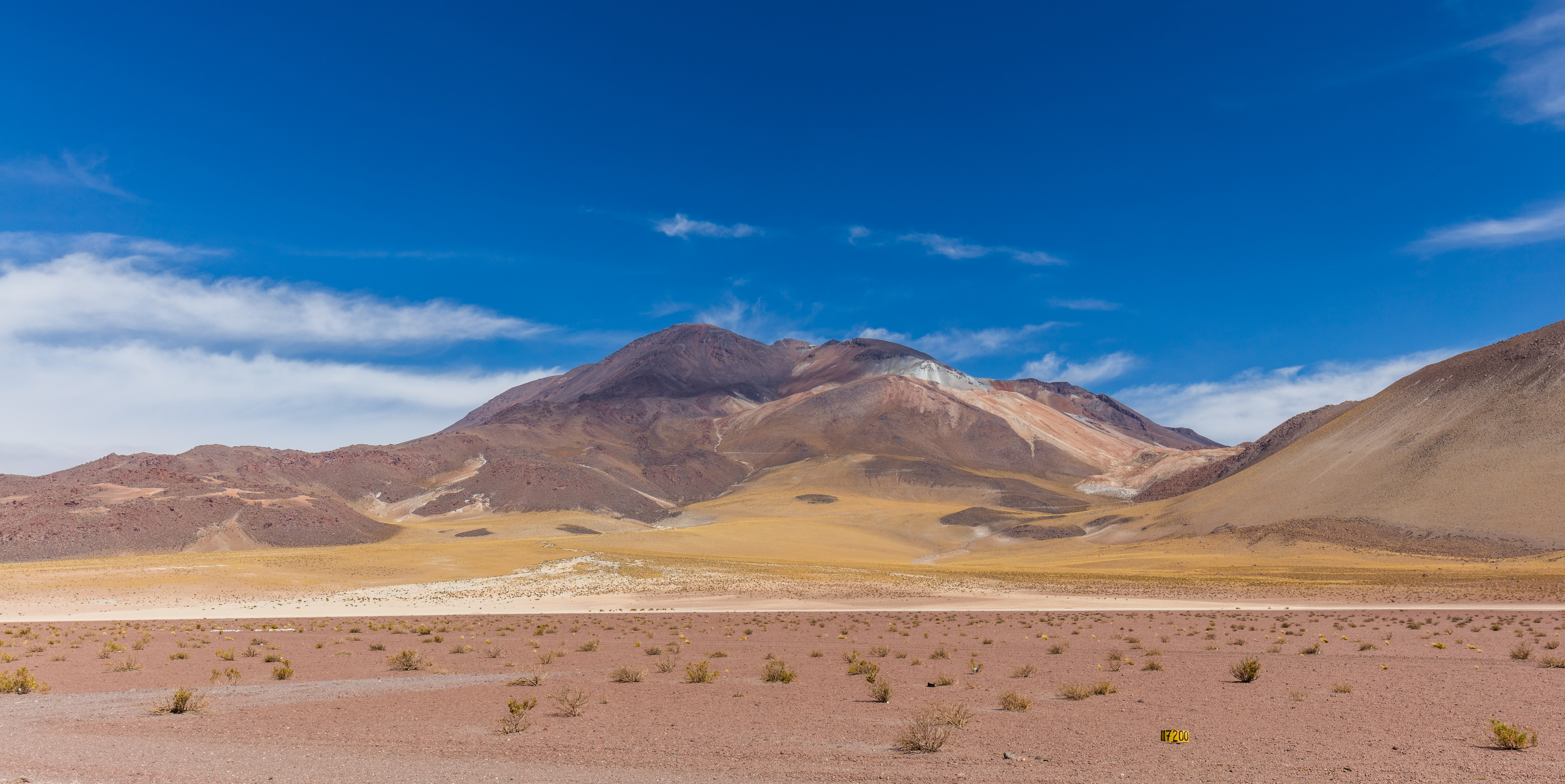
- Cerro del Azufre.

Highest point
- Elevation: 5,846 m (19,180 ft)
- Coordinates: 21.787°S 68.237°W

Geography
- Location within Chile
- Location: Chile
- Parent range: Andes

Geology
- Mountain type: Stratovolcano
- Last eruption: Unknown

Cerro del Azufre (Spanish pronunciation: [ˈsero ðel aˈsufɾe]) is a stratovolcano located in El Loa Province, Antofagasta Region, Chile. It is part of a chain of volcanoes that separate Upper Loa River basin from the endorheic Salar de Ascotán basin and is flanked to the west by a dacitic lava dome called Chanka or Pabellón. The 6000 metre volcanoes San Pedro and San Pablo are located to the southwest of Cerro del Azufre.

== Geography and geomorphology ==
Cerro del Azufre lies in northern Chile, close to the border with Bolivia and south of the Salar de Ascotan. Route 21-CH highway, which passes northwest from the volcano, connects the city of Calama with Ollagüe town. Formerly, the Inca road system passed east of the volcano. Sulfur was mined on the mountain in the past.

With a diameter of 14 kilometres (8.7 mi), the volcano is one of the largest in the area, and reaches a height of 5,846 metres (19,180 ft). It consists of two overlapping volcanic edifices, with the northern having two vents and the southern three; each edifice has a summit crater and there are reportedly crater lakes. They are separated by about 2 kilometres (1.2 mi) of hydrothermally altered terrain, where there are three mining areas. The northern edifice bears evidence of a sector collapse that produced a northward debris avalanche, which was later buried by lava flows. The southern edifice has moraine deposits and gorges formed by erosion; there are also traces of rock glaciers. The Chac-Inca and Cerro Chanka lava domes lie east and west, respectively, between the two edifices of Cerro del Azufre.

The area is dominated by volcanoes that often reach over 6,000 metres (20,000 ft) elevation and are of Miocene to Holocene age. Neighbouring volcanoes include San Pedro and San Pablo to the south, Carasilla to the northwest and the Apacheta-Aguilucho volcanic complex to the east which is sometimes grouped with Cerro del Azufre. Cerro del Azufre and neighbouring volcanoes to the southeast form the Azufre-Inacaliri volcanic chain, which is formed mainly by lava flows with compositions ranging from basaltic andesite to rhyolite.

== Geology ==
During the last 10 million years, caldera eruptions in the Altiplano-Puna volcanic complex (APVC) have generated ignimbrites and lavas which underlie Cerro del Azufre. The APVC is linked to the Altiplano-Puna Magma Body under the Altiplano; the latter is the highest volcanic plateau in the world. It has a volume of about 500,000 cubic kilometres (120,000 cu mi) of partially molten rock and may be the source of heat for geothermal fields, of magma for lava domes that were emplaced in the area during the last 120,000 years and of the Azufre magma. Northwest-southeast trending strike-slip faults run across the volcanic arc and appear to have influenced both the volcanic activity and the formation of ore deposits; they include the Azufre-Inacaliri lineament that Cerro del Azufre is part of. The Pabelloncito graben formed in the Azufre-Inacaliri chain when the volcanoes spread under their own weight and deformed during the Pliocene-Quaternary.

=== Composition ===
Volcanic rocks from Cerro del Azufre define an andesite to dacite suite, with plagioclase phenocrysts. The pathways of magma formation are poorly elucidated but appear to have taken place at two different depths under the volcano. Hydrothermal alteration has produced alunite, gypsum, hematite, kaolinite and sulfur. Isotope ratios indicate that distinct components went into forming the erupted magmas, including possible below-volcanic arc magmas and hydrothermally altered rocks. The magma would be stored at two levels, and eruptions took place when magma from the lower level entered the upper level.

== Eruption history ==
Volcanic activity at Cerro del Azufre took place in four stages. The first stage crops out at isolated sites on the southern flank, and consists of eroded lava flows; one age of 1.1±0.2 million years may be attributable to this unit. The second stage was emplaced between about 0.7-0.5 million years ago and forms parts of the western and northern parts of Cerro del Azufre. It consists of lava flows and pyroclastic flows less than 2 metres (6 ft 7 in) thick; the sector collapse may have occurred during this stage. The third stage formed between 0.5-0.3 million years ago and is constituted by the southern edifice; it is made up by lava flows and a summit lava dome. The fourth stage makes up the northern edifice and the conspicuous lava flows there. It is not precisely dated, but based on the amount of erosion it was subject to it was probably emplaced between 0.3-0.12 million years ago and before the late glacial 20,000 years ago. The volcano grew at a rate of 0.01–0.2 cubic kilometres per kiloare (2.2×10^{−9}–4.46×10^{−8} cu mi/sq ft), which is typical for volcanoes in the region. Several lava domes such as Chac-Inca, Pabellón and Chanca grew around the volcano. Despite the young appearance of the volcanic features, none of its structures have yielded ages of less than 80,000 years and the volcano is considered extinct. Current geomorphic processes include landslides.

=== Geothermal activity ===
While there are no active hydrothermal structures at Cerro del Azufre, traces of extinct fumaroles are found on the western flank of the northern edifice, and active hot springs with temperatures of about 42 °C (108 °F) occur at the northern foot of Cerro del Azufre. Seismic tomography and electrical conductivity analysis has identified a zone under the volcano that may be either a magma chamber or a hydrothermal system. Cerro Pabellón is one of several geothermal fields in this part of the Andes and as of 2022 the only one where geothermal power is being produced. The field reaches the surface in the Apacheta-Aguilucho volcanic complex but may extend over an area of 25 square kilometres (9.7 sq mi) underground.

== See also ==
- List of volcanoes in Chile
- Ollagüe
- Cerro Paniri
- San Pedro de Inacaliri River
