= Salar de Carcote =

Coordinates: 21°22′S 68°22′W

Salar de Carcote viewed from the south

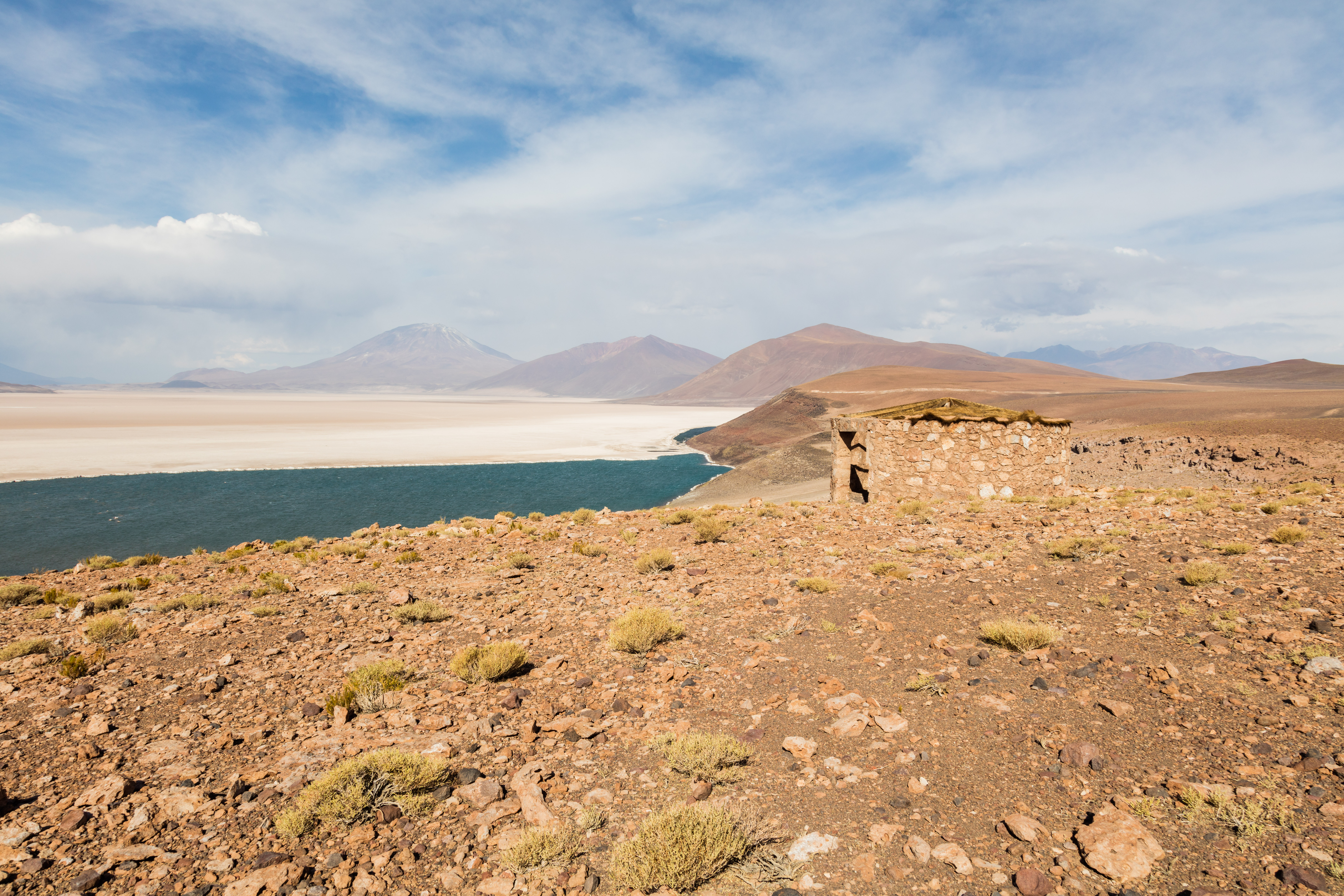
Salar de Carcote.

Salar de Carcote, also known as Salar de San Martín, is a salt flat in northern Chile. The salar is located southwest of Ollagüe. It covers an area of around 108 km^{2} (42 sq mi) and its surface elevation is 3,690 m (12,110 ft). The landscape of the area is dominated by the volcanoes Ollagüe to the east and Aucanquilcha to the north. Salar de Carcote basin is bordered by the Loa River basin to the west and the Salar de Ascotán basin to the south.

Salar de Carcote is a remnant of an ancient lake. Formerly, a connection existed to Lake Minchin. Nowadays, small lakes dot the shores of this salt flat. They are concentrated mainly along its western shore and comprise a surface of approximately between 3 and 4 km^{2} (1.2 and 1.5 sq mi). The main one of those is Laguna Verde (Green Lagoon).
