= Ollagüe, Chile =

Ollagüe
- Commune
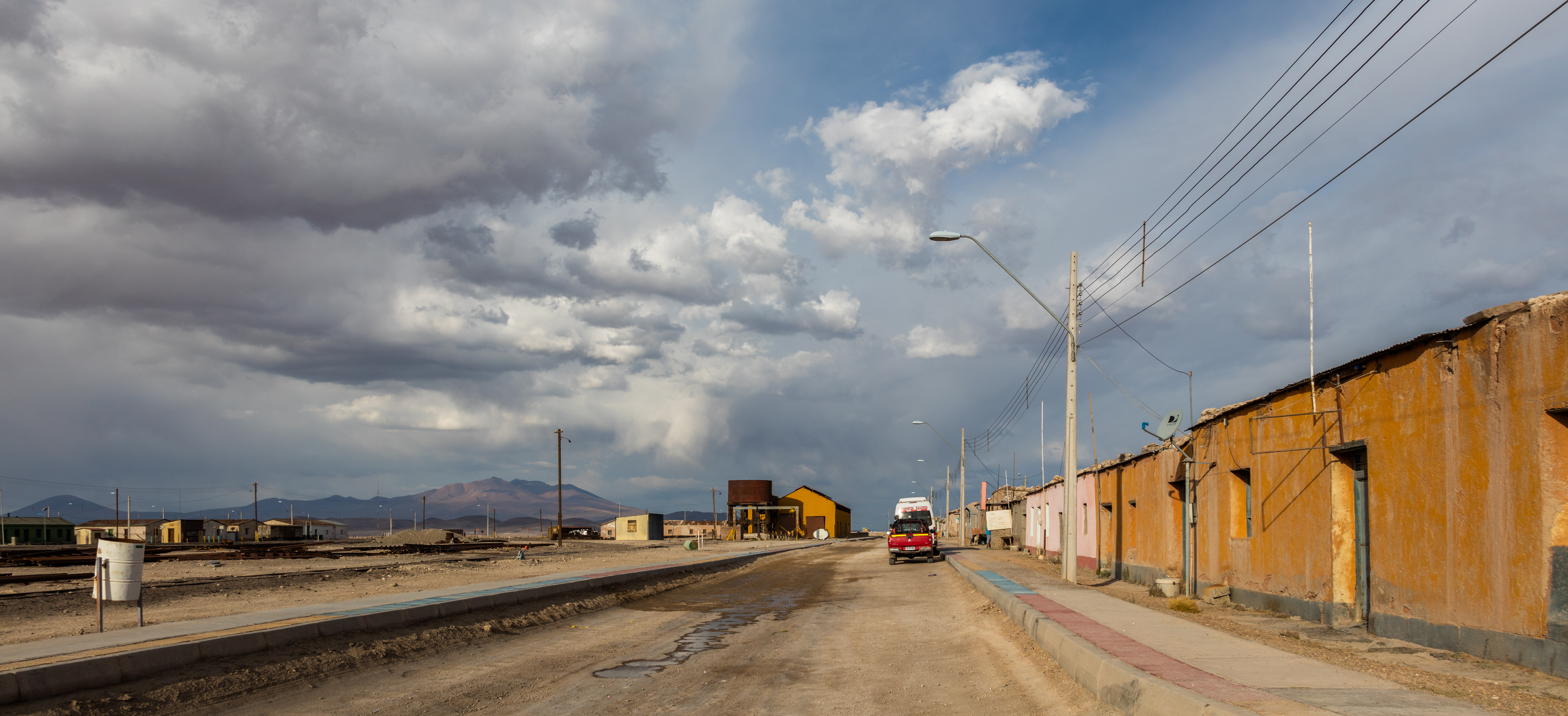
- Ollagüe

- Coat of arms Map of Ollagüe in Antofagasta Region Location in Chile
- Mottoes: Ilustre Municipalidad de Ollagüe, El Loa - Chile. Soberanía, Progreso; Illustrious Municipality of Ollagüe, El Loa - Chile; Sovereignty, Progress
- Coordinates: 21°13′29″S 68°15′10″W
- Country: Chile
- Region: Antofagasta
- Province: El Loa
- Founded: 1979

Government
  - Type: Municipal council
  - Alcalde: Carlos Reygadas Bavestrello (UDI)

Area
  - Total: 2,963.9 km^{2} (1,144.4 sq mi)
- Elevation: 3,703 m (12,149 ft)

Population (2012 Census)
  - Total: 199
  - Density: 0.0671/km^{2} (0.174/sq mi)
  - Urban: 0
  - Rural: 318

Sex
  - Men: 210
  - Women: 108
- Time zone: UTC-4 (CLT)
  - Summer (DST): UTC-3 (CLST)
- Area code: (+56) 5
- Website: Municipalidad de Ollagüe

Ollagüe is a Chilean frontier village and commune in El Loa Province, Antofagasta Region. The village is 215 kilometres (134 mi) northeast of the city of Calama, and has a station and marshalling yard on the FCAB rail line.

The commune is in the Andean altiplano, bordering with Bolivia. It also includes the localities of Cebollar, Ascotán, Amincha, El Inca, Coska, Puquios, and Chela.

"Ollagüe" (Pronounced: oh-YA-gweh) is the Hispanicized spelling of Ullawi (Aymara ullaña to see, to look at, to watch, wi a nominalizing suffix to indicate a place, "viewpoint").

== Demographics ==
According to the 2002 census of the National Statistics Institute, Ollagüe had 318 inhabitants (210 men and 108 women). Of these, none lived in urban areas and 318 (100%) in rural areas. The population fell by 28.2% (125 persons) between the 1992 and 2002 censuses.

== Administration ==
As a commune, Ollagüe is a third-level administrative division of Chile administered by a municipal council, headed by an alcalde who is directly elected every four years.

Within the electoral divisions of Chile, Ollagüe is represented in the Chamber of Deputies by Marcos Espinosa (PRSD) and Felipe Ward (UDI) as part of the third electoral district, (together with Tocopilla, María Elena, Calama and San Pedro de Atacama). The commune is represented in the Senate by Carlos Cantero Ojeda (Ind.) and José Antonio Gómez Urrutia (PRSD) as part of the second senatorial constituency (Antofagasta Region).

== Nearby Attractions ==
Nearby attractions include:

- Ollagüe volcano
- Aucanquilcha volcano
- Salar de Ascotán
- Salar de Carcote
