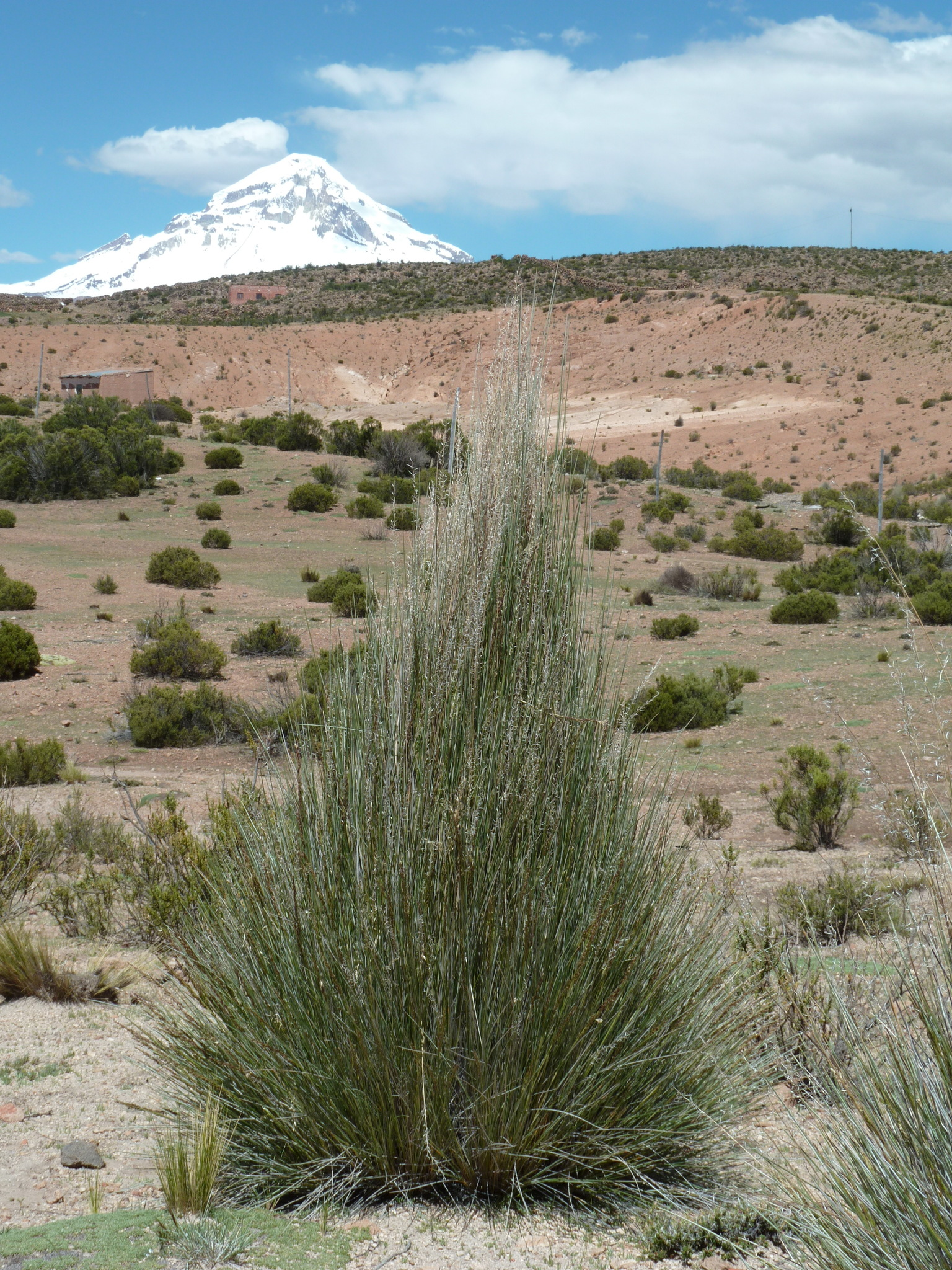
- In Bolivia

Scientific classification
- Kingdom: Plantae
- Clade: Tracheophytes
- Clade: Angiosperms
- Clade: Monocots
- Clade: Commelinids
- Order: Poales
- Family: Poaceae
- Subfamily: Pooideae
- Genus: Festuca
- Species: F. chrysophylla

Binomial name
- Festuca chrysophylla Phil.

Synonyms
- Festuca deserticola var. chrysophylla (Phil.) St.-Yves; Festuca deserticola var. juncea St.-Yves; Festuca eriostoma Hack.; Festuca juncea Phil.; Festuca meyenii (St.-Yves); Festuca orthophylla Pilg.; Festuca orthophylla var. boliviana Pilg.; Festuca orthophylla subvar. boliviana (Pilg.) St.-Yves; Festuca orthophylla var. eriostoma (Hack.) St.-Yves; Festuca orthophylla subvar. glabrescens (Pilg.) St.-Yves; Festuca orthophylla var. glabrescens Pilg.; Festuca orthophylla var. meyenii St.-Yves

= Festuca chrysophylla =

Species of grass

Festuca chrysophylla is a species of grass in the family Poaceae. It is native to Peru, Bolivia, northwestern Argentina, and north central Chile. It grows in subalpine or subarctic biomes. It was first described in 1891.

== Description ==
Festuca chrysophylla is perennial and caespitose. Its culms are erect, and can grow up from 30 to 65 cm long. It is lacking of lateral branches. The leaf sheaths are glabrous on the surface. It's ligules is a ciliolate membrane, growing up from 0.3 to 0.5 mm long, and are bilobed. The leaf blades are filiform, conduplicate and can grow up from 7–40 cm long and 0.7–1 mm wide.
