= Salar de Ascotán =

Coordinates: 21°35′S 68°15′W

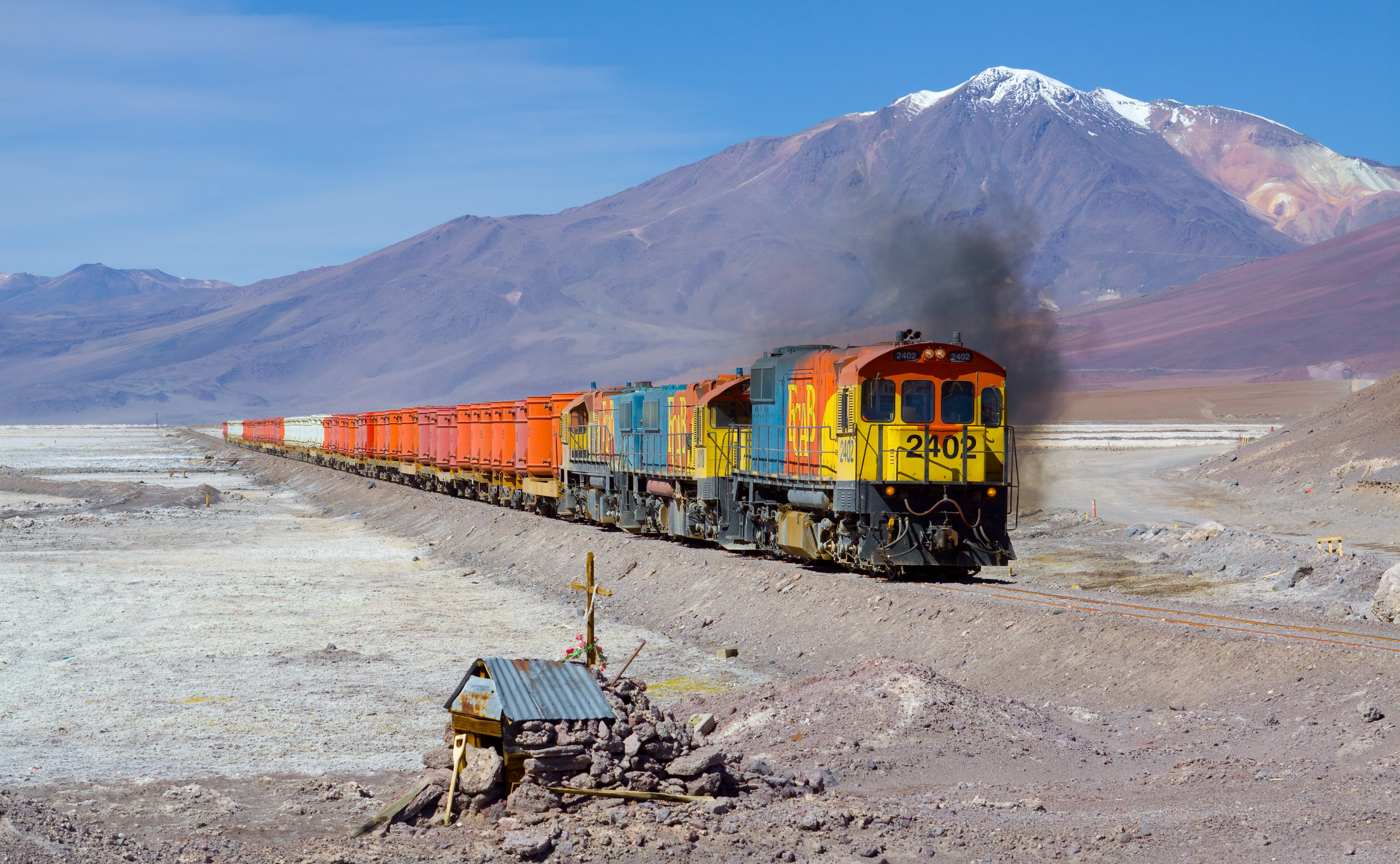
Three FCAB engines with a "bucket train" crossing the Salar de Ascotán, with Cerro del Azufre in the background.

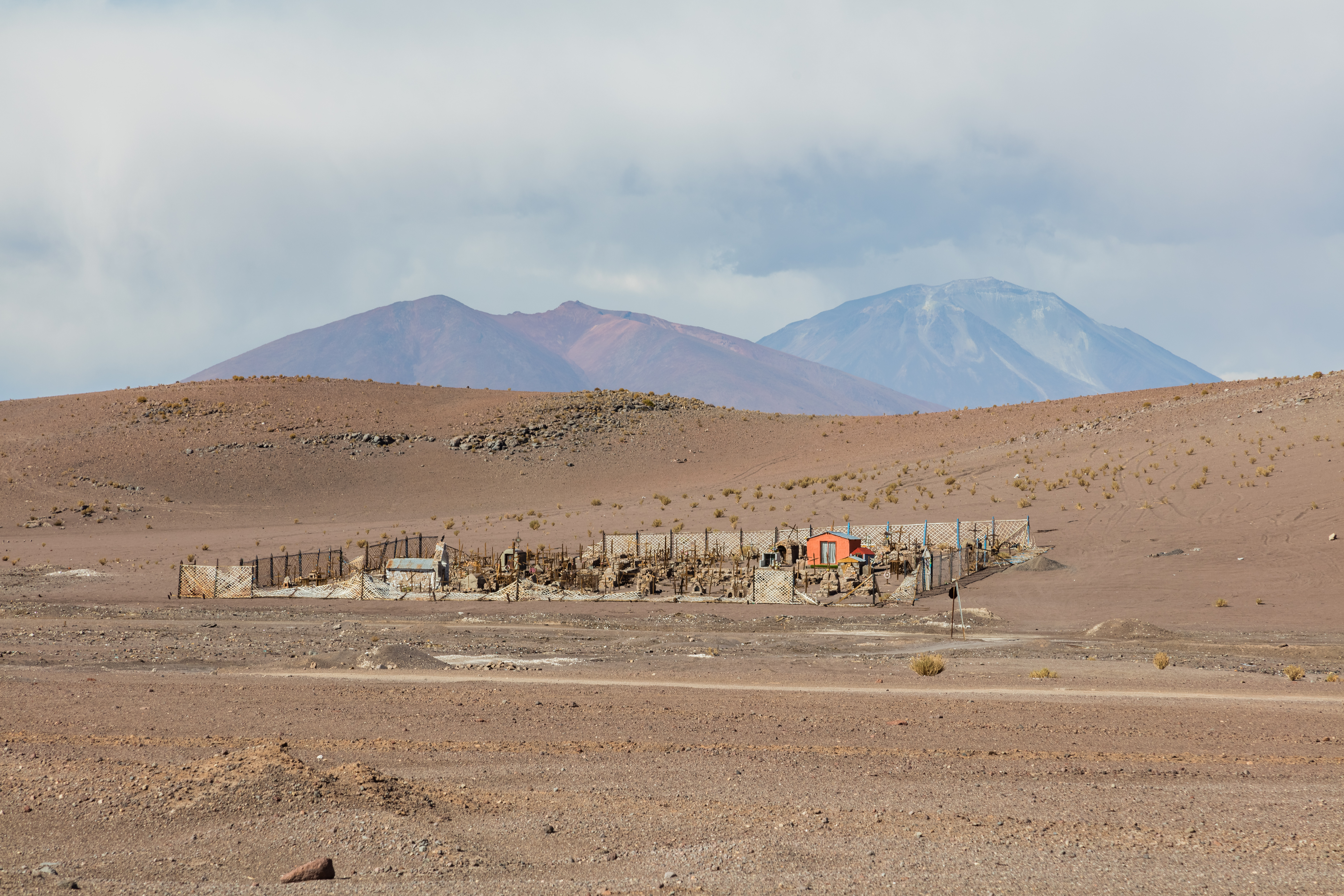
Cemetery at the salar.

Salar de Ascotán, also known as Salar de Cebollar, is a salt flat in northern Chile. Its drainage basin is 1,455 square kilometers (562 sq mi) and is shared with Bolivia. The basin is bordered on the north by the Salar de Carcote basin, on the east by small endorheic basins, including those of Laguna Cañapa and Laguna Hedionda, from which it is separated by the crest of the Cerros de Cañapa, Cerro Araral and others. To the south, the basin is bordered by the San Pedro de Inacaliri River basin, while to the west the drainage divide between the salt flat and the Upper Loa River basin is marked by the summits of a chain of volcanoes culminating in Palpana.

Salar de Ascotán has a surface area of 246 square kilometers (95 sq mi) and the train line of the FCAB runs on the west side of the salt flat for over 35 kilometers (22 mi). The salt pan was formerly filled by a 270 square kilometres (104 sq mi) large lake that was separated from Lake Minchin by a barrier at least 79 metres (260 ft) high.
