= Inacaliri =

Mountain in Bolivia

Coordinates: 21.981°S 68.071°W

Inacaliri is a mountain in the Andes Mountains, situated on the border of Bolivia and Chile in the Potosí Department and in the Antofagasta Region. It has a height of 5,618 metres (18,432 ft) and has a summit crater about 400 metres (1,312 ft) in diameter, which contains a crater lake.

== See also ==
- List of mountains in the Andes
