= Vilama (caldera) =

Mountain in Bolivia and Argentina

Vilama caldera
- Location within Bolivia

Highest point
- Elevation: 5,340 m (17,520 ft)

Vilama is a Miocene caldera in Bolivia and Argentina. Straddling the border between the two countries, it is part of the Central Volcanic Zone, one of the four volcanic belts in the Andes. Vilama is remote and forms part of the Altiplano-Puna volcanic complex, a province of large calderas and associated ignimbrites that were active since about 8 million years ago, sometimes in the form of supervolcanoes.

The Vilama caldera was originally estimated to have a size of 40 by 65 kilometres (25 mi × 40 mi) but the size was later revised to be between 15–18 kilometres (9.3–11.2 mi) and 35–40 kilometres (22–25 mi) and is almost entirely buried beneath younger volcanoes that have grown along the margin of the caldera; volcanic activity on these volcanoes continued into the Pleistocene. Several lakes also developed on the floor of the caldera, which contains a resurgent dome.

Vilama is the source of the enormous Vilama ignimbrite, which was emplaced during an eruption with a volcanic explosivity index of 8 about 8.4–8.5 million years ago. A large amount of the Vilama ignimbrite is inside the caldera depression, while the part outside of the caldera covers a surface area exceeding 4,000 square kilometres (1,500 sq mi). The total volume of the ignimbrite is about 1,200–1,800 cubic kilometres (290–430 cu mi), possibly as much as 2,100 cubic kilometres (500 cu mi). Another large ignimbrite, the Sifon ignimbrite, may also have been erupted by Vilama, while the Granada ignimbrite was later attributed to a separate volcano.

== Geography and geomorphology ==
The Vilama caldera lies on the border between Argentina and Bolivia in the Puna-Altiplano, a high plateau in the Central Andes. The volcano straddles the border between Bolivia and Argentina, northeast of Cerro Zapaleri which is the tripoint between Argentina, Bolivia and Chile there. The region is largely uninhabited owing to its harsh climate, however several archeological sites have been found and obsidian from Vilama has been found throughout northwestern Argentina.

Vilama is part of the Central Volcanic Zone, which together with the Northern Volcanic Zone, Southern Volcanic Zone and Austral Volcanic Zone is one of the four volcanic belts along the Andes. The Central Volcanic Zone is home to more than a thousand volcanoes, of which 44 were active after glacial times. Many of these are part of the main volcanic arc, which consists of stratovolcanoes such as Coropuna, the Nevados de Payachata, Ojos del Salado and Ollagüe and frequently reach heights of above 6,000 metres (20,000 ft). The Central Volcanic Zone is also the site of a number of large calderas, such as Los Frailes, Kari-Kari, Pastos Grandes, Cerro Panizos, Cerro Guacha, Purico complex, Coranzulí, La Pacana, Aguas Calientes, Negra Muerta volcanic complex, Galán, Wheelwright caldera and Incapillo.

The Vilama caldera is between 15–18 kilometres (9.3–11.2 mi) and 35–40 kilometres (22–25 mi) wide. Younger volcanic rocks have almost entirely obscured its margins, with the exception of a 250–400-metre (820–1,310 ft) high escarpment on the western side of the caldera. The caldera contains a 30-by-10-kilometre (18.6 mi × 6.2 mi) large resurgent dome surrounded by a 400–800-metre (1,300–2,600 ft) deep moat. This moat, which is missing on the eastern side of the caldera, contains several lakes such as Laguna Chojllas, Laguna Coruto and Laguna de Vilama, the last of which gives the caldera its name. Several younger volcanic centres are found around the caldera and may be located above its margin, such as the Khastor domes and stratovolcano, the Cerro Alcoak and Cerro Salle volcanoes, the Cerros Conventos-Niño-Coyamboy chain, Vitichi and Cerro Bayo domes and the 5,678 metres (18,629 ft) high Vilama stratovolcano. These edifices are mostly dacitic centres that are considered to be the expression of post-collapse volcanism at the Vilama system.

The caldera was at first considered to be 40 by 65 kilometres (25 mi × 40 mi) in width with a centre around 22°36′S 66°51′W, coinciding with the Vilama depression. Vents were localized on the eastern margin beneath the Cerro Caucani, Cerro Solterío, Campanario and Coyaguayma volcanoes, which in turn make up the Abra Granada volcanic complex. One nested caldera associated with the Bonanza ignimbrite was identified as well, the 20-by-40-kilometre (12 mi × 25 mi) Coruto caldera which is situated southwest of the redefined extent of the Vilama caldera.

== Geology ==
Off the western coast of South America, the oceanic Nazca Plate subducts beneath the South America Plate in the Peru-Chile Trench. Volcanism associated with subduction in the region has been ongoing since the Jurassic. Dehydration of the downgoing slab causes melts to form in the abovelying asthenosphere which drive the activity in the volcanic arc.

East of the main volcanic arc of the Central Volcanic Zone the back-arc region has been volcanically active since the Oligocene, generating volcanic edifices ranging from small monogenetic volcanoes to large calderas with their ignimbrites. The latter form the so-called Altiplano-Puna volcanic complex centered around the Chile-Bolivia-Argentina tripoint, which was mainly active in the Miocene to Pleistocene and is one of the largest such ignimbrite provinces in the world. These centres mainly erupted dacitic magmas. Among the Altiplano-Puna volcanic complex volcanoes are the Cerro Panizos northeast of Vilama and the Cerro Guacha southwest of Vilama; the Vilama, Coruto and Guacha calderas have been designed the "Eduardo Avaroa caldera complex" (Complejo Caldérico Eduardo Avaroa).

The volcanic history of the Altiplano-Puna volcanic complex is poorly known, due to the overlap and burial of older volcanic centres beneath younger ones, difficulties in separating different ignimbrites, the lack of erosion resulting in poor exposure of the units and the challenges of accessing the remote region. Chronological correlations indicate that volcanic activity commenced 10 million years ago and increased 8 million years ago; the onset of volcanic activity was likely triggered by the entry of basaltic magma in the crust after a portion of the lithosphere had broken off. Between 8-4 million years ago large scale eruptions occurred, such as these at Cerro Panizos, Coranzulí, Vilama, Cerro Guacha and La Pacana. Volcanic activity decreased by the Pleistocene, during which activity occurred within the La Pacana caldera and at Cerro Purico, with the most recent eruptions formed the Cerro Chao dome and the Cerro Chascon-Runtu Jarita complex. Ongoing surface deformation at Uturunku is viewed as a sign that volcanic activity in the Altiplano-Puna volcanic complex is still ongoing. Seismic imaging shows the existence of a partially molten magma body in the crust beneath the Altiplano-Puna volcanic complex.

The pre-caldera terrain at Vilama is formed by various sedimentary and volcanic formations, such as the Paleozoic Acoite Formation and the Cretaceous Salta Group; Ordovician sediments are the most important component of the basement while later units only sporadically crop out. Volcanic units of Oligocene-Miocene age predating the formation of the Vilama caldera include the 9.7–9.8 million years old Granada ignimbrite, the 10.25 ± 0.12 million years old Lagunillas ignimbrite, the 9.8 ± 0.7 million years old Ojo de Perico lavas and other volcanic units. Later volcanic activity from other volcanoes in the region led to the emplacement of extraneous volcanic rocks in the Vilama caldera, such as the Bonanza, Cienago and Panizos ignimbrites and the Loromayu lavas. In terms of tectonics, during the Cenozoic the region was substantially uplifted, forming a high plateau with an average elevation of about 4 kilometres (2.5 mi).

=== Composition ===
The Vilama ignimbrite is made out of dacite, which belongs to a potassium-rich calc-alkaline suite. The ignimbrite contains phenocrysts consisting of biotite, hornblende, andesine plagioclase, pyroxene quartz and opaque components. These minerals more generally also form the primary mineral phases of the ignimbrite, while allanite, apatite, iron oxide, titanium oxide and zircon are accessory phases. Probably as a consequence of heterogeneous magma composition, the chemistry and petrography of the ignimbrites varies between separate units and outcrops. It has been inferred that before the eruption the magma was 760–810 °C (1,400–1,490 °F) hot. A mixing between mantle derived and crustal melts has been suggested to be the source of the magma for both Vilama and other Altiplano-Puna volcanic complex systems.

== Climate and vegetation ==
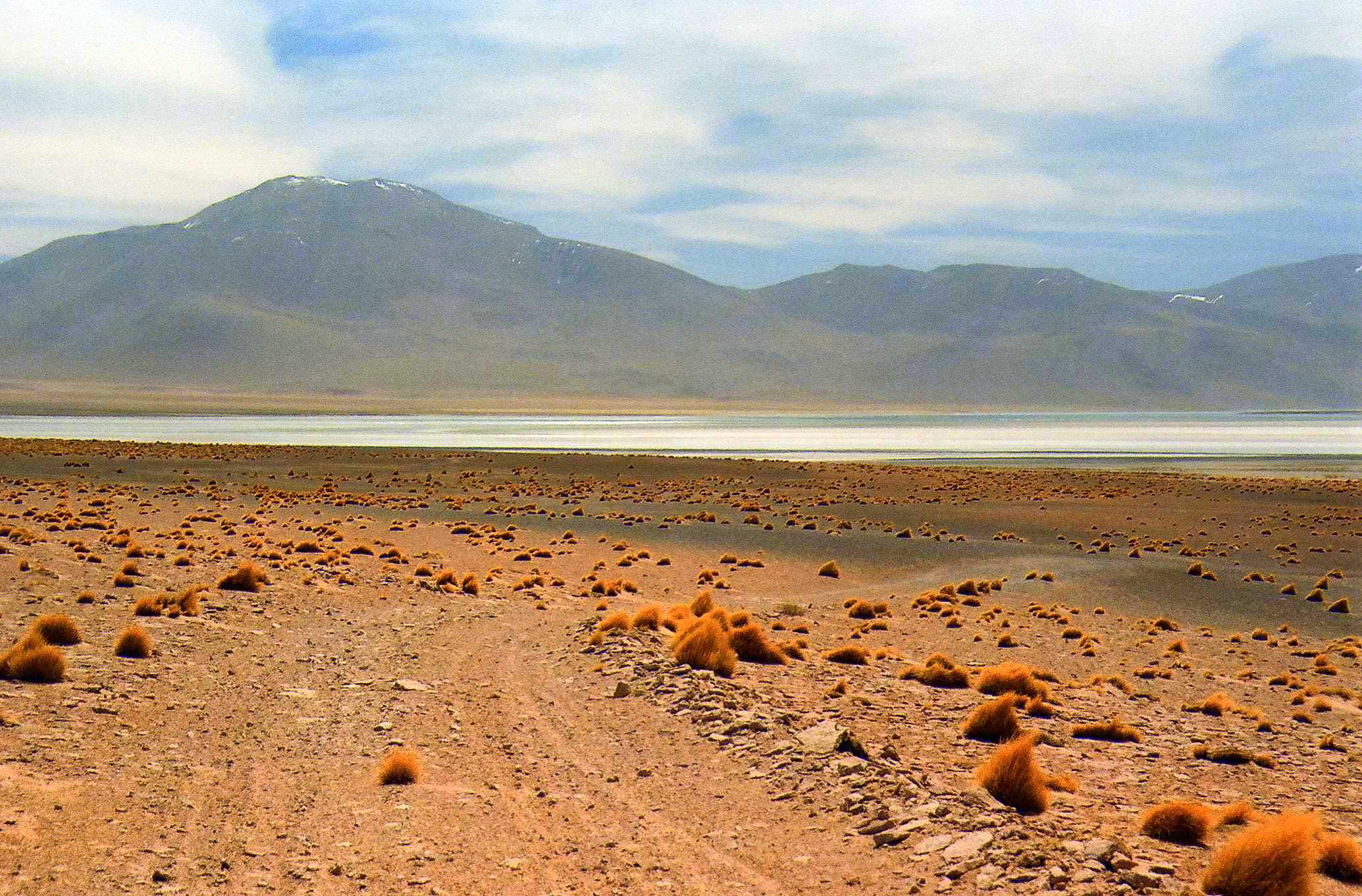
View from the Laguna Vilama to the Vilama stratovolcano, showing a typical landscape

The region has a dry climate with irregular rainfall (300 millimetres per year (12 in/year)), temperatures between 3–6 °C (37–43 °F) and high diurnal temperature variations. Vegetation consists of shrub steppe, with Festuca, quenoa, tola, Prosopis ferox and yareta being typical members. The volcanically dominated terrain is free of vegetation, with most life occurring close to waterbodies (including the grasses Oxychloe andina and Werneria pygmaea). A number of mammals and birds are found in the region, including flamingos at lakes.

== Eruption history ==
The Vilama caldera is the source of the Vilama ignimbrite, which covers a surface of more than 4,000 square kilometres (1,500 sq mi) and was erupted concurrently with the collapse and formation of the caldera. The eruption occurred between 8.4–8.5 million years ago, but with substantial scatter of the radiometric dates which according to Soler et al. 2007 may be due to excess argon contaminating biotites and thus resulting in spurious age data. Based on the characteristics of the ignimbrite, the eruption was likely triggered by the failure of the magma chamber roof and subsequent onset of vigorous fountaining of ignimbrites through vents formed in the magma chamber roof; similar eruption conditions have been inferred for other Altiplano-Puna ignimbrites. The eruption may have taken the form of a Plinian eruption, an unusual occurrence for Altiplano-Puna caldera collapse events.

The ignimbrite is often welded and displays joint features. It is rich in crystals but has little lithic and pumiceous content and few fiamme. The entire ignimbrite contains phenocrysts with sizes reaching about 3–5 millimetres (0.12–0.20 in) of length. Detailed descriptions of the ignimbrite were provided by Soler et al. 2007.

Inside the caldera, the Vilama ignimbrite was emplaced as several flow units which are usually 10–20-metre (33–66 ft) thick; some units reach thicknesses of 40–50 metres (130–160 ft). These units together are at least 400–700 metres (1,300–2,300 ft) thick and form a uniform layer of densely welded ignimbrites with poorly preserved pumice and lithic fragments. The ignimbrite deposit inside the caldera shows evidence of flow forms and alteration by vapour interactions. Outside of the caldera, the ignimbrite is formed by two different cooling units with distinct characteristics. The lower cooling unit is massive, poorly welded and contains lithics and pumices; the content of these varies at different sites and there are several different types of pumices. The thickness of the lower cooling unit varies between 7 metres (23 ft) to exceeding 110 metres (360 ft), and pre-existent topography has controlled the emplacement of the unit; it crops out mainly in valleys. The upper cooling unit is thicker and covers a larger surface than the lower unit, although part of the latter may be buried beneath the upper cooling unit. The upper cooling unit was emplaced on a flat surface as a uniform deposit with thicknesses ranging from 18 metres (59 ft) in its southern sector to 60 metres (200 ft) north. The upper cooling unit is itself subdivided into a basal and an upper section; the basal section is strongly welded sometimes to the point of being vitrophyric with few fiamme and lithic fragments, whereas the upper section is poorly welded and light brown to pink in colour, with columnar jointing. A transitional area separates the 1–50 metres (3 ft 3 in – 164 ft 1 in) thick upper unit with moderate quantities of lithics and fiamme from the lower unit. The two cooling units may have formed under different eruption conditions: High fountains may be the source of the lower cooling unit and lower and less stable fountains that of the upper cooling unit.

The Vilama ignimbrite also includes other ignimbrites that were formerly considered to be separate ignimbrites, such as the Capaderos ignimbrite, Ceja Grande ignimbrite, Tobas Coruto, Tobas Lagunillas 1, Tobas Lagunillas 2, Tobas Lagunillas 3, Tobas Loromayu 1, Tobas Lupi Gera and Toloma ignimbrite. The inclusion of these volcanic products into the Vilama ignimbrite was based on the similarity between their characteristics and those of the actual Vilama ignimbrite, including paleomagnetic and petrologic traits, and together they establish an ignimbrite field elongated towards the south and northwest away from the caldera. The outcrops cover an area of 4,000 square kilometres (1,500 sq mi). The total volume of the ignimbrite is difficult to constrain as much of it is not exposed and the shape of the caldera where large parts of the ignimbrite ponded is poorly known, but may range from between 1,200–1,800 cubic kilometres (290–430 cu mi) to 2,100 cubic kilometres (500 cu mi), with most of it being contained within the caldera. Based on such sizes, the caldera-forming eruption is considered to be a supereruption with a volcanic explosivity index of 8 and Vilama caldera is thus a supervolcano.

Fracchia et al. 2010 further proposed that the "Pululus ignimbrite" which forms the Cerro Pululos southeast of Vilama is actually a section of the Vilama ignimbrite, which was later uplifted by a dacitic intrusion. Additionally, it has been proposed that the 1,000 cubic kilometres (240 cu mi) Sifon ignimbrite, which was erupted 8.33 ± 0.06 million years ago, may originate in the Vilama caldera.

Volcanic activity continued at Vilama after the caldera collapse, driven by a relatively quick recovery of the magmatic system after the formation of the caldera, and resulted in the formation of the resurgent dome. Among the products of this volcanism are the 5–8.1 ± 0.6 million year old northerly Khastor domes and stratovolcano, the 6–8.4 ± 0.6 million year old eastern centres (Cerro Alcoak, Cerro Salle, Bayo dome and the Vilama and Toloma lavas) and the less than 8.4 million years old Mesada Negra lavas on the resurgent dome. The Vitichi domes are of Pliocene age. At Cerro Vilama volcanic activity continued into the Pleistocene, with potassium-argon dating yielding dates of 1.2 ± 0.1 and 900,000 ± 30,000 years ago. Magnetotelluric imaging of the area has identified a low electrical conductivity anomaly beneath the caldera, which may be a solidified magma body.

Originally, the Granada ignimbrite was also considered to be a product of an earlier eruption of the Vilama caldera; later research indicated that it has its own eruptive centre at Abra Granada that is unrelated to Vilama. According to this older theory of caldera history, the Granada ignimbrite was the first stage of caldera formation, with the second stage generating the Vilama ignimbrite proper. This theory also envisaged two later stages of activity, the first linked to the Cerro Morado mafic volcanics and the Salle and Ceja Grande ignimbrites, while the fourth produced the Bonanza ignimbrite from the Coruto caldera as well as additional volcanoes including Cerro Zapaleri.
