= Altiplano–Puna volcanic complex =

Complex of volcanic systems in the Puna of the Andes

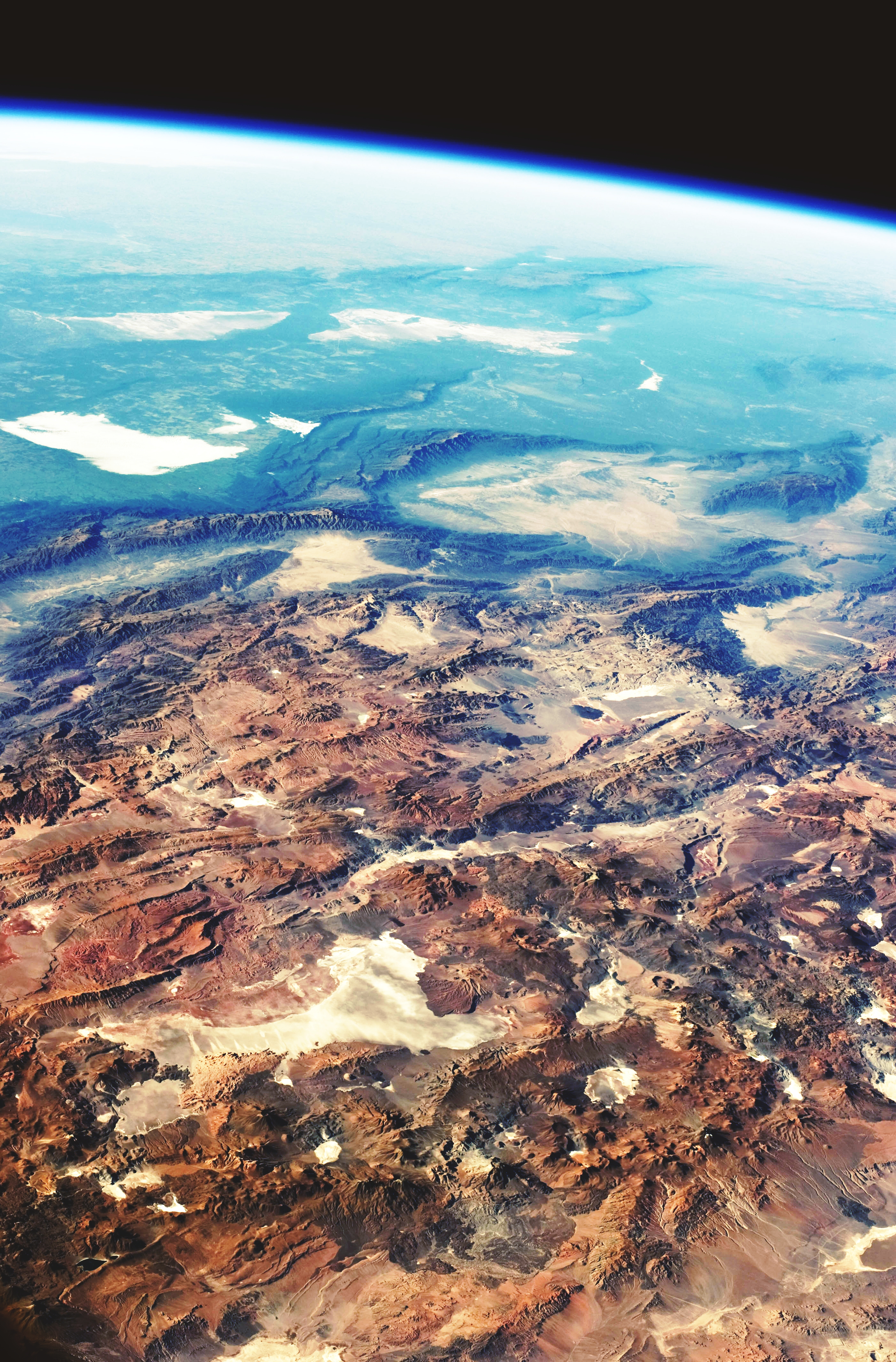
The APVC lies in the lower part of the image, above the chain of volcanoes at the bottom.

The Altiplano–Puna volcanic complex (Spanish: Complejo volcánico Altiplano-Puna), also known as APVC, is a complex of volcanic systems at the Puna of the Andes. It is located in the Altiplano area, a highland bounded by the Bolivian Cordillera Real in the east and by the main chain of the Andes, the Western Cordillera, in the west. It results from the subduction of the Nazca Plate beneath the South American Plate. Melts caused by subduction have generated the volcanoes of the Andean Volcanic Belt including the APVC. The volcanic province is located between 21–24°S latitude. The APVC spans the countries of Argentina, Bolivia, and Chile.

In the Miocene–Pliocene (10–1 Mya), calderas erupted felsic ignimbrites in four distinct pulses separated by periods of low levels of activity. At least three volcanic centres (Guacha caldera, La Pacana, Pastos Grandes, Vilama) had eruptions of a Volcanic Explosivity Index (VEI) of 8, as well as smaller-scale eruptive centres. Activity waned after 2 Mya, but present-day geothermal activity and volcanoes dated to the Holocene, as well as recent ground deformation at Uturuncu volcano indicate still-extant present-day activity of the system.

== Geography ==
The Andes mountain chain originated from the subduction of the Nazca Plate below the South American Plate and was accompanied by extensive volcanism. Between 14° S and 28° S lies one volcanic area with over fifty recently active systems, the Central Volcanic Zone (CVZ). Since the late Miocene between 21° S and 24° S, a major ignimbrite province formed over 70-kilometre-thick (43-mile) crust, the Altiplano–Puna volcanic complex, between the Atacama and the Altiplano. The Toba volcanic system in Indonesia and Taupō in New Zealand are analogous to the province. The APVC is located in the southern Altiplano–Puna plateau, a surface plateau 300 kilometres (190 mi) wide and 2,000 kilometres (1,200 mi) long at an altitude of 4,000 metres (13,000 ft), and lies 50–150 kilometres (31–93 mi) east of the volcanic front of the Andes. Deformational belts limit it in the east. The Altiplano itself forms a block that has been geologically stable since the Eocene; below the Atacama area, conversely, recent extensional dynamics and a weakened crust exist. The Puna has a higher average elevation than the Altiplano, and some individual volcanic centres reach altitudes of more than 6,000 metres (20,000 ft). The basement of the northern Puna is of Ordovician to Eocene age. The Pastos Grandes-Lipez-Coranzuli lineament forms the northern boundary of the Altiplano–Puna volcanic complex.

== Geology ==
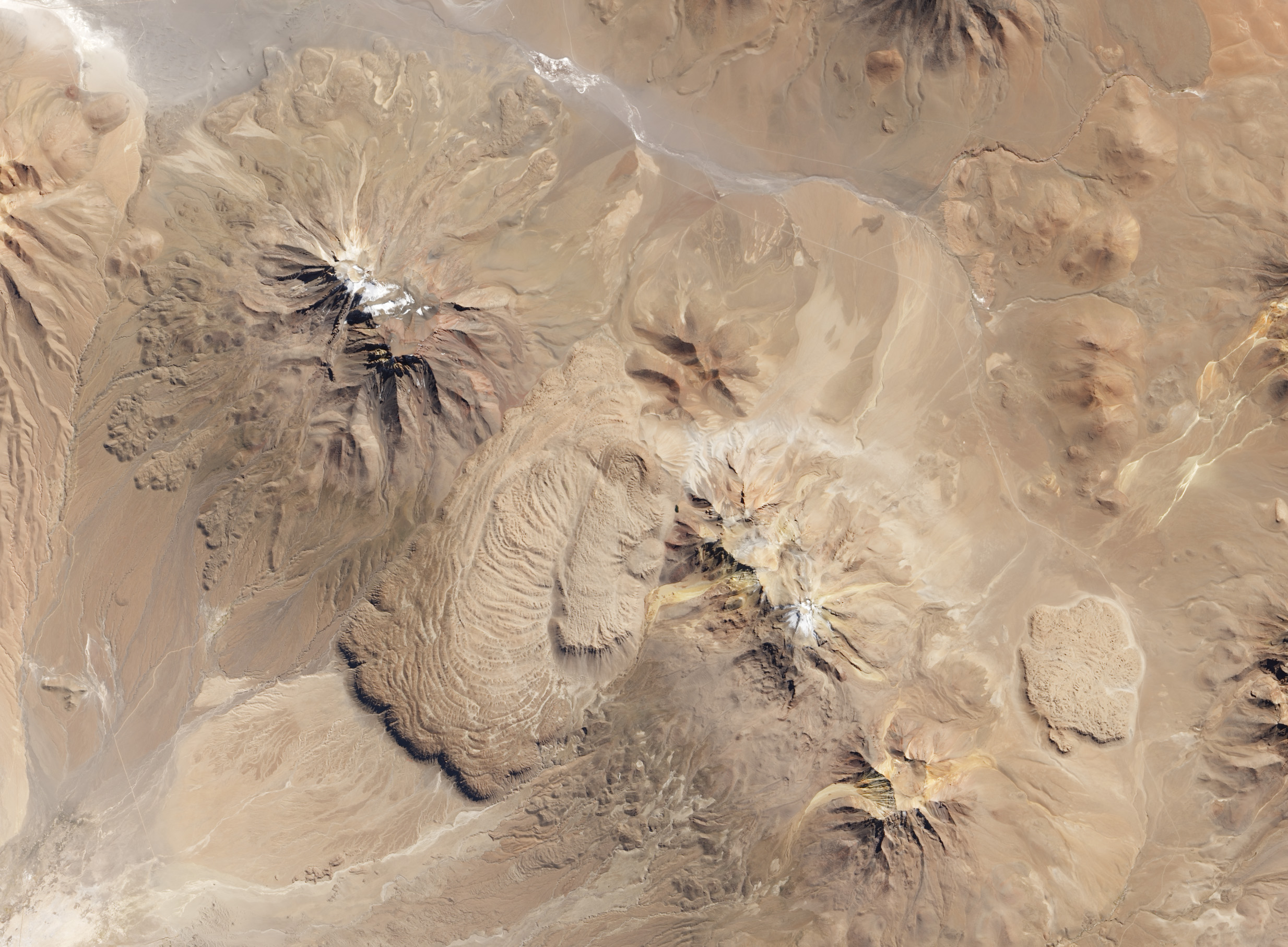
The lobate flows of the Cerro Chao lava dome

The APVC is generated by the subduction of the Nazca Plate beneath the South American Plate at an angle of nearly 30°. Delamination of the crust has occurred beneath the northern Puna and southern Altiplano. Below 20 kilometres (12 mi) depth, seismic data indicate the presence of melts in a layer called the Altiplano–Puna low-velocity zone or Altiplano Puna magma body. Regional variations of activity north and south of 24°S have been attributed to the southwards-moving subduction of the Juan Fernández Ridge. This southwards migration results in a steepening of the subducting plate behind the ridge, causing decompression melting and causing the area of active volcanism to move southward in the APVC. Between 1/4 and 1/6 of the generated melts are erupted to the surface as ignimbrites.

Mafic rocks are associated with strike-slip faults and normal faults and are found in the southern Puna and Altiplano. The southern Puna has calc-alkaline andesites erupted after 7 Mya, with the least evolved magmas being the 6.7-Mya Cerro Morado and 8–7-metre Rachaite complex flows. Basaltic over shoshonitic (both 25 and 21 metres) to andesitic (post-Miocene) lavas are found in the southern Altiplano.

Ignimbrites deposited during eruptions of APVC volcanoes are formed by "boiling-over" eruptions, where magma chambers containing viscous, crystal-rich, volatile-poor magmas partially empty in tranquil, non-explosive fashion. As a result, the deposits are massive and homogeneous and show few size-segregation or fluidization features. Such eruptions have been argued to require external triggers to occur. There is a volume-dependent relationship between homogeneity of the eruption products and their volume; large-volume ignimbrites have uniform mineralogical and compositional heterogeneity, while small volume ignimbrites often show gradation in composition. This pattern has been observed in other volcanic centres such as the Fish Canyon Tuff in the United States and the Toba ignimbrites in Indonesia.

Petrologically, ignimbrites are derived from dacitic–rhyodacitic magmas. Phenocrysts include biotite, iron–titanium oxides, plagioclase, and quartz with minor apatite and titanite. Northern Puna ignimbrites also contain amphibole, and clinopyroxene and orthopyroxene occur in low-silicon magmas, while higher-silicon magmas also contain sanidine. These magmas have temperatures of 700–850 °C (1,292–1,562 °F) and originate in depths of 4–8 kilometres (2.5–5.0 mi). The ignimbrites are collectively referred to as San Bartolo and Silapeti Groups.

Since the Miocene, less silicic magmas containing olivine, plagioclase, and clinopyroxene have been erupted by the APVC as well. These "mafic" magmas form various monogenetic volcanoes, inclusions in more silicic magmas and lava flows which sometimes occur in isolation and sometimes are linked to stratovolcanoes.

Eruptions are affected by the local conditions, resulting in high-altitude eruption columns that are sorted by westerly stratospheric winds. Coarse deposits are deposited close to the vents, while fine ash is carried to the Chaco and eastern cordillera. The highest volcanoes in the world are located here, including the 6,887-metre (22,595-foot) Ojos del Salado and 6,723-metre (22,057-foot) Llullaillaco. Some volcanoes have undergone flank collapses covering as much as 200 km^{2} (77 mi^{2}). Most calderas are associated with fault systems that may play a role in caldera formation.

== Scientific investigation ==
The area's calderas are poorly understood and some may yet be undiscovered. Some calderas were subject to comprehensive research. Research in this area is physically and logistically difficult. Neodymium, lead, and boron isotope analysis has been used to determine the origin of eruption products.

The dry climate and high altitude of the Atacama Desert has protected the deposits of APVC volcanism from erosion, but limited erosion also reduces the exposure of buried layers and structures. Evidence of volcanic activity and cyclic variation has been obtained from remote fallout deposits as well.

== Geologic history ==
The APVC area before the upper Miocene was largely formed from sedimentary layers of Ordovician to Miocene age and deformed during previous stages of Andean orogeny, with low-volume volcanics. Activity until the late Miocene was effusive with andesite as the major product. After a volcanic pause related to flat-slab subduction, starting from 27 Mya volcanism increased suddenly.

Ignimbrites range in age from 25 Mya to 1 Mya. In the late Miocene, more evolved andesite magmas were erupted, and the crustal components increased. In the late Tertiary until the Quaternary, a sudden decrease of mafic volcanism coupled with a sudden appearance of rhyodacitic and dacitic ignimbrites occurred. During this flare-up, it erupted primarily dacites with subordinate amounts of rhyolites and andesites. The area was uplifted during the flare-up, and the crust thickened to 60–70 kilometres (37–43 mi). This triggered the formation of evaporite basins containing halite, boron, and sulfate and may have generated the nitrate deposits of the Atacama Desert. The sudden increase is explained by a sudden steepening of the subducting plate, similar to the Mid-Tertiary ignimbrite flare-up. In the northern Puna, ignimbrite activity began 10 Mya, with large-scale activity occurring 5 to 3.8 Ma in the arc front and 8.4 to 6.4 Ma in the back arc. In the southern Puna, backarc activity set in 14–12 Ma and the largest eruptions occurred after 4 Ma. The start of ignimbritic activity is not contemporaneous in the entire APVC area; north of 21°S the Alto de Pica and Oxaya Formations formed 15–17 and 18–23 Mya respectively, whereas south of 21°S large scale ignimbrite activity did not begin until 10.6 Mya, and the southernmost APVC segment has not undergone any widespread ignimbrite activity yet.

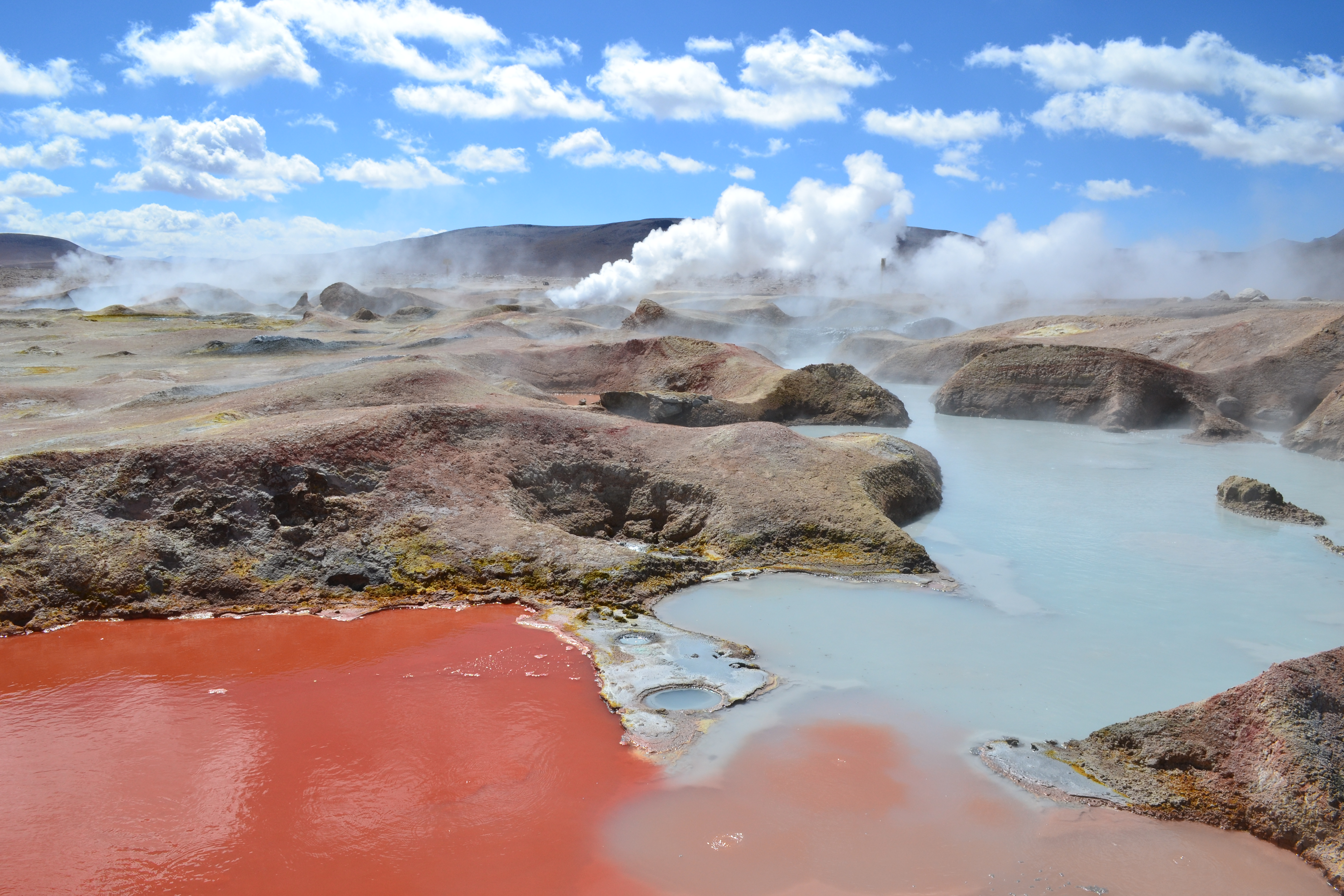
Sol de Mañana in southern Bolivia, a geothermally active area in the APVC

Activity waned after 2 Mya, and after 1 Mya and during the Holocene, activity was mostly andesitic in nature with large ignimbrites absent. Activity with composition similar to ignimbrites was limited to the eruption of lava domes and flows, interpreted as escaping from a regional sill 1–4 kilometres (0.62–2.49 mi) high at 14–17 kilometres (8.7–10.6 mi) depth.

The APVC is still active, with recent unrest and ground inflation detected by InSAR at Uturuncu volcano starting in 1996. Research indicates that this unrest results from the intrusion of dacitic magma at 17 kilometres (11 mi) or more depth and may be a prelude to caldera formation and large-scale eruptive activity. Other active centres include the El Tatio and Sol de Mañana geothermal fields and the fields within Cerro Guacha and Pastos Grandes calderas. The latter also contains <10 ka rhyolitic flows and domes. The implications of recent lava domes for future activity in the APVC are controversial, but the presence of mafic components in recently erupted volcanic rocks may indicate that the magma system is being recharged.

== Extent ==
The APVC erupted over an area of 70,000 square kilometres (27,000 mi^{2}) from ten major systems, some active over millions of years and comparable to Yellowstone Caldera and Long Valley Caldera in the United States. The APVC is the largest ignimbrite province of the Neogene with a volume of at least 15,000 cubic kilometres (3,600 mi^{3}), and the underlying magmatic body is considered to be the largest continental melt zone, forming a batholith. Alternatively, the body revealed by seismic studies is the remnant mush of the magma accumulation zone. Deposits from the volcanoes cover a surface area of more than 500,000 square kilometres (190,000 mi^{2}). La Pacana is the largest single complex in the APVC with dimensions 100 by 70 kilometres (62 mi × 43 mi), including the 65-by-35-kilometre (40 mi × 22 mi) caldera.

Magma generation rates during the pulses are about 0.001 cubic kilometres per year (0.032 m^{3}/s), based on the assumption that for each 50–100 cubic kilometres (12–24 cu mi) of arc there is one caldera. These rates are substantially higher than the average for the Central Volcanic Zone, 0.00015–0.0003 cubic kilometres per year (0.0048–0.0095 m^{3}/s). During the three strong pulses, extrusion was even higher at 0.004–0.012 cubic kilometres per year (0.13–0.38 m^{3}/s). Intrusion rates range from 0.003–0.005 cubic kilometres per year (0.095–0.158 m^{3}/s) and resulted in plutons of 30,000–50,000 cubic kilometres (7,200–12,000 cu mi) volume beneath the calderas.

== Source of magmas ==
Modelling indicates a system where andesitic melts coming from the mantle rise through the crust and generate a zone of mafic volcanism. Increases in the melt flux and thus heat and volatile input causes partial melting of the crust, forming a layer containing melts reaching down to the Moho that inhibits the ascent of mafic magmas because of its higher buoyancy. Instead, melts generated in this zone eventually reach the surface, generating felsic volcanism. Some mafic magmas escape sideward after stalling in the melt-containing zone; these generate more mafic volcanic systems at the edge of the felsic volcanism, such as Cerro Bitiche. The magmas are mixtures of crust derived and mafic mantle-derived melts with a consistent petrological and chemical signature. The melt generation process may involve several different layers in the crust.

Another model requires the intrusion of basaltic melts into an amphibole crust, resulting in the formation of hybrid magmas. Partial melting of the crust and of hydrous basalt generates andesitic–dacitic melts that escape upwards. A residual forms composed from garnet pyroxenite at a depth of 50 kilometres (31 mi). This residual is denser than the mantle peridotite and can cause delamination of the lower crust containing the residual.

Between 18 and 12 Mya the Puna–Altiplano region was subject to an episode of flat subduction of the Nazca Plate. A steepening of the subduction after 12 Mya resulted in the influx of hot asthenosphere. Until that point, differentiation and crystallization of rising mafic magmas had mostly produced andesitic magmas. The change in plate movements and increased melt generation caused an overturn and anatexis of the melt-generating zone, forming a density barrier for mafic melts which subsequently ponded below the melt-generating zone. Dacitic melts escaped from this zone, forming diapirs and the magma chambers that generated APVC ignimbrite volcanism.

Magma generation in the APVC is periodical, with pulses recognized 10, 8, 6, and 4 Mya. The first stage included the Artola, Granada, Lower Rio San Pedro, and Mucar ignimbrites. The second pulse involved the Panizos, Sifon, and Vilama ignimbrites, and the third was the largest, with a number of ignimbrites. The fourth pulse was weaker than the preceding ones and involved the Patao and Talabre ignimbrites, among others. The formation of silicic magmas in the crust hinders the ascent of other denser magmas, which resume erupting only after large explosions have removed the silicic magma.

The magmas beneath the APVC are noticeably rich in water derived from the subduction of water-rich rocks. A volume ratio of about 10–20% of water has been invoked to explain the pattern of electrical conductivity at a depth of 15–30 kilometres (9.3–18.6 mi). The total amount of water has been estimated to be c. 14×10^{15} kilograms (31×10^{15} lb), comparable to large lakes on Earth.

== Tomographic studies ==
Seismic tomography is a technique that uses seismic waves produced by earthquakes to gather information on the composition of the crust and mantle below a volcanic system. Different layers and structures in the Earth have different propagation speeds of seismic waves and attenuate them differently, resulting in different arrival times and strengths of waves travelling in a certain direction. From various measurements, 3D models of the geological structures can be inferred. Results of such research indicate that a highly hydrated slab derived from the Nazca Plate – a major source of melts in a collisional volcanism system – underlies the Western Cordillera. Below the Altiplano, low-velocity zones indicate the presence of large amounts of partial melts that correlate with volcanic zones south of 21° S, whereas north of 21° S, thicker lithospheric layers may prevent the formation of melts. Next to the Eastern Cordillera, low-velocity zones extend farther north to 18.5° S. A thermally weakened zone, evidenced by strong attenuation, in the crust is associated with the APVC. This indicates the presence of melts in the crust. A layer of low velocity (shear speed of 1 kilometre per second (0.62 mi/s)) 17–19 kilometres (11–12 mi) thick is assumed to host the APVC magma body. This body has a volume of about 480,000–530,000 cubic kilometres (120,000–130,000 cu mi) and a temperature of about 1,000 °C (1,830 °F). Other seismological data indicate a partial delamination of the crust under the Puna, resulting in increased volcanic activity and terrain height.

== Subsystems ==
- Aguas Calientes caldera (24°15′S 66°30′W)
- Alto de los Colorados (26°05′S 68°15′W)
- Cerro Bitiche (22°52′S 67°3′W)
- Cerro Blanco caldera (26°41′S 67°46′W)
- Cerro Chanka (21°48′S 68°15′W)
- Cerro Chao (22°07′S 68°09′W)
- Cerro Chascon (21°53′S 67°54′W)
- Cerro Chillahuita (22°10′S 68°02′W)
- Cerro Galán (26°00′S 66°50′W)
- Cerro Morado (22°51′S 66°43′W)
- Cerro Panizos (22°15′S 66°45′W)
- Chaxas (22°47.5′S 67°57.5′W)
- Chipas caldera
- Coranzulí caldera (23°0′S 66°15′W)
- Delmedio (24°10′S 67°03′W)
- El Morro-Organullo
- Granada complex (22°57′S 66°58′W)
- Guacha caldera (22°45′S 67°28′W)
- Huayra Huasi volcanic complex (23°30′S 66°37′W)
- Kapina caldera (21°50′S 67°35′W)
- Laguna Amarga caldera (26.7°S 68.5°W)
- La Torta (22°26′S 67°58′W)
- La Pacana (23°10′S 67°25′W)
- Lascar (23°22′S 67°44′W)
- Negra Muerta volcanic complex (24°28′S 66°12′W)
- Pairique volcanic complex (22°54′S 66°48′W)
- Pastos Grandes (21°45′S 67°50′W)
- Pocitos (24°10′S 67°03′W)
- Purico Complex (22°57′S 67°45′W)
- Quevar (24°19′S 66°43′W)
- Rachaite complex (23°0′S 66°5′W)
- Ramadas volcanic complex (24°10′S 66°20′W)
- Rincon volcanic complex (24°05′S 67°20′W)
- Tastil volcano (24°45′S 65°53′W)
- El Tatio (22°25′12″S 68°1′12″W)
- TulTul (24°10′S 67°03′W)
- Uturuncu (22°16′12″S 67°10′48″W)
- Vallecito caldera (26°30′S 68°30′W)
- Vilama (22°36′S 66°51′W)

== Ignimbrites ==
- Abra Grande Ignimbrite, 6.8 Mya.
- Acay Ignimbrite, 25 km^{3} (6.0 mi^{3}) 9.5–9.9 Mya.
- Antofalla Ignimbrite, 11.4–9.6 Mya.
- Arco Jara Ignimbrite, 2 km^{3} (0.48 mi^{3}) 11.3 Mya.
- Artola/Mucar Ignimbrite, 100 km^{3} (24 mi^{3}) 9.4–10.6 Mya.
- Atana Ignimbrite, 1,600 km^{3} (380 mi^{3}) 4.11 Mya.
- Blanco Ignimbrite, 7 km^{3} (1.7 mi^{3}).
- Caspana Ignimbrite, 8 km^{3} (1.9 mi^{3}) 4.59–4.18 Mya.
- Cerro Blanco Ignimbrite, 150 km^{3} (36 mi^{3}) 0.5–0.2 Mya.
- Cerro Colorado, 9.5–9.8 Mya.
- Cerro Lucho lavas, 1 km^{3} (0.24 mi^{3}) 10.6 Mya.
- Cerro Panizos Ignimbrite, 650 km^{3} (160 mi^{3}) 6.7–6.8 Mya.
- Chuhuilla Ignimbrite, 1,200 km^{3} (290 mi^{3}) 5.45 Mya.
- Cienago Ignimbrite, 7.9 Mya.
- Cueva Negra/Leon Muerto Ignimbrites, 35 km^{3} (8.4 mi^{3}) 3.8–4.25 Mya.
- Cusi Cusi Ignimbrite, >10 Mya.
- Galan Ignimbrite, 550 km^{3} (130 mi^{3}) 2.1 Mya.
- Granada/Orosmayo/Pampa Barreno Ignimbrite, 60 km^{3} (14 mi^{3}) 10-10.5 Mya.
- Grenada Ignimbrite, 9.8 Mya.
- Guacha Ignimbrite, 1,200 km^{3} (290 mi^{3}) 5.6–5.7 Mya.
- Guaitiquina Ignimbrite, 5.07 Mya.
- Laguna Amarga Ignimbrite, 3.7–4.0, 5.0 Mya.
- Laguna Colorada Ignimbrite, 60 km^{3} (14 mi^{3}) 1.98 Mya.
- Laguna Verde Ignimbrite, 70 km^{3} (17 mi^{3}) 3.7–4.0 Mya.
- Las Termas Ignimbrite 1 and 2, 650 km^{3} (160 mi^{3}) 6.45 Mya.
- Los Colorados Ignimbrite, 7.5–7.9 Mya.
- Merihuaca Ignimbrites, 50 km^{3} (12 mi^{3}) 5.49–6.39 Mya.
- Morro I Ignimbrite, 12 Mya.
- Morro II Ignimbrite, 6 Mya.
- Pairique Chico block and ash, 6 km^{3} (1.4 mi^{3}) 10.4 Mya.
- Pampa Chamaca, 100 km^{3} (24 mi^{3}) 2.52 Mya.
- Pitas/Vega Real Grande Ignimbrites, 600 km^{3} (140 mi^{3}) 4.51–4.84 Mya.
- Potrero Grande Ignimbrite, 9.8–9 Mya.
- Potreros Ignimbrite, 6.6 Mya.
- Purico Ignimbrite, 100 km^{3} (24 mi^{3}) 1.3 Mya.
- Puripicar Ignimbrite, 1,500 km^{3} (360 mi^{3}) 4.2 Mya.
- Rachaite volcanic complex, 7.2–8.4 Mya.
- Rosada Ignimbrite, 30 km^{3} (7.2 mi^{3}) 6.3–8.1 Mya.
- Sifon Ignimbrite, 8.3 Mya.
- Tajamar/Chorrillos Ignimbrite, 350 km^{3} (84 mi^{3}) 10.5–10.1 Mya.
- Tamberia Ignimbrite, 10.7–9.5 Mya.
- Tara Ignimbrite, 100 km^{3} (24 mi^{3}) 3.6 Mya.
- Tatio Ignimbrite, 40 km^{3} (9.6 mi^{3}) 0.703 Mya.
- Toba 1 Ignimbrite, 6 km^{3} (1.4 mi^{3}) 7.6 Mya.
- Toconao pumice, 100 km^{3} (24 mi^{3}) 4.65 Mya.
- Vallecito Ignimbrite, 40 km^{3} (9.6 mi^{3}) 3.6 Mya.
- Verde Ignimbrite, 140–300 km^{3} (34–72 mi^{3}) 17.2 Mya.
- Vilama Ignimbrite, 8.4–8.5 Mya.
- Vizcayayoc Ignimbrite, 13 Mya.

== Bibliography ==
- del Potro, Rodrigo; Díez, Mikel; Blundy, Jon; Camacho, Antonio G.; Gottsmann, Joachim (2013). "Diapiric ascent of silicic magma beneath the Bolivian Altiplano". Geophysical Research Letters. 40 (10): 2044–2048. Bibcode:2013GeoRL..40.2044D. doi:10.1002/grl.50493. hdl:10261/88258. S2CID 31771758.
- Salisbury, M. J.; Jicha, B. R.; de Silva, S. L.; Singer, B. S.; Jimenez, N. C.; Ort, M. H. (2010). "40Ar/39Ar chronostratigraphy of Altiplano-Puna volcanic complex ignimbrites reveals the development of a major magmatic province". Geological Society of America Bulletin. 123 (5–6): 821–840. Bibcode:2011GSAB..123..821S. doi:10.1130/B30280.1.
- Chmielowski, Josef; Zandt, George; Haberland, Christian (1999). "The Central Andean Altiplano-Puna magma body". Geophysical Research Letters. 26 (6): 783–786. Bibcode:1999GeoRL..26..783C. doi:10.1029/1999GL900078. S2CID 129812369.
- De Silva, S.; Zandt, G.; Trumbull, R.; Viramonte, J. G.; Salas, G.; Jimenez, N. (2006). "Large ignimbrite eruptions and volcano-tectonic depressions in the Central Andes: a thermomechanical perspective". Geological Society, London, Special Publications. 269 (1): 47–63. Bibcode:2006GSLSP.269...47D. doi:10.1144/GSL.SP.2006.269.01.04. S2CID 129924955.
