= Cerro Bitiche =

Volcanic field in Argentina

Coordinates: 22°52′S 67°3′W

Cerro Bitiche is a volcanic field in Argentina. It is located east of the Central Volcanic Zone away from the volcanic arc within the Altiplano-Puna volcanic complex (APVC), close to Zapaleri volcano.

The field is formed by seven scoria cones and lava flows, of andesite-basaltic andesite composition. The field was formed by volcanism contemporaneous with the ignimbrite volcanism of the APVC, with Cerro Guacha and La Pacana calderas being located nearby.

== Geography and Geology ==
=== Regional setting ===
Cerro Bitiche is located in the area of the northern Puna-southern Altiplano, within Argentina and close to the tripoint with Bolivia and Chile. The Altiplano-Puna highland with horizontal dimensions of 2,000 by 300 kilometres (1,240 mi × 190 mi) and average altitudes of 4,200–3,500 metres (13,800–11,500 ft) is the second highest plain in the world. Zapaleri and the Rio Zapaleri are located northwest of Bitiche.

The field is located c. 60 kilometres (37 mi) behind the main volcanic arc of the Central Volcanic Zone. The region is the site of the Miocene Altiplano-Puna volcanic complex, one of the world's largest ignimbrite province. The rocks erupted in the complex are derived from the crust and the mantle in equal amounts. A number of mafic volcanic fields and isolated cones are found in the northern Puna.

=== Local setting ===
Cerro Bitiche is part of a number of mafic volcanic centres associated with the Altiplano-Puna volcanic complex. The two major calderas La Pacana and Cerro Guacha are close to Cerro Bitiche, the eastern margin of Guacha's oldest caldera is located just east of Bitiche. Ordovician marine sequences form the tectonic basement of the area, but most of it is covered by ignimbrites and lavas between 8.5-4 million years old.

The volcanic field covers a surface area of 200 square kilometres (77 sq mi), including lava flows and scoria cones. The highest scoria cone has a height of 120 metres (390 ft). These scoria cones are formed by lapilli and pyroclastics with no welding and also contain lava bombs. They are in part constructed on top of pyroclastic and ash beds with some traces of sedimentation. Some cones have assumed a horseshoe shape resulting from the collapse of their flanks during lava emission. The arid climate in the area has preserved the edifices. The lava field has the shape of a plateau that has been modified by later tectonic movements. The lava flows carry pyroclastic mounds probably rafted from the scoria cones and have frequently developed foliations. Due to the overlapping of separate volcanoes and intense erosion discerning individual units is difficult.

The volcanic field has erupted andesite and basaltic andesite, which when in lava form is grey to black in colour. Phenocryst composition in the rocks varies, encompassing olivine, orthopyroxene, plagioclase and small amounts of biotite. Chemically, the rocks are magnesium-rich potassium-rich calc-alkaline. Ilmenite is an important accessory mineral. Some rocks have undergone palagonite-forming alteration. Xenoliths are also found within the lava, both quartz containing xenocrysts and sedimentary rocks. The magmas that formed the field have compositions indicating they derive from primitive mantle magmas, which formed in the shallow mantle. Based on geothermometer analysis, temperatures of crystallization of the magmas have been obtained ranging 1,000–1,200 °C (1,830–2,190 °F) and higher. Magma formation was probably influenced by the formation of ephemeral magma chambers and the interaction with crustal components and other magmas.

== Eruptive history ==
The Bitiche lavas cover the c. 8.4 million years old Vilama ignimbrites and are in part covered by the 3.49 ± 0.01 million years old Tara ignimbrite, indicating that the field formed in the late Miocene-early Pliocene at the time where volcanism in the Altiplano-Puna volcanic complex reached its maximum.

The volcanic activity that formed the scoria cones was probably mainly strombolian with some lava fountaining. The start of volcanic activity may have been preceded by hydrovolcanic processes that have left characteristic deposits.

== See also ==
- Cerro Morado
- List of volcanic fields

== Sources ==
- Coira, Beatriz L.L.; Cisterna, Clara Eugenia (2021). Textures, Structures and Processes of Volcanic Successions. Springer Earth System Sciences. doi:10.1007/978-3-030-52010-6. ISBN 978-3-030-52009-0. ISSN 2197-9596. S2CID 221767857.
- Maro, Guadalupe; Caffe, Pablo J. (21 June 2016). "The Cerro Bitiche Andesitic Field: petrological diversity and implications for magmatic evolution of mafic volcanic centers from the northern Puna". Bulletin of Volcanology. 78 (7): 51. Bibcode:2016BVol...78...51M. doi:10.1007/s00445-016-1039-y. hdl:11336/46534. S2CID 133134870.
