= Coranzulí (caldera) =

Volcano in Argentina

Coranzuli
- Location within Argentina

Highest point
- Coordinates: 23°00′S 66°18′W

Coranzulí is a Miocene caldera in northern Argentina's Jujuy Province. Part of the Argentine Andes' volcanic segment, it is considered a member of the Central Volcanic Zone (CVZ). At the heart of the CVZ lies the Altiplano-Puna volcanic complex, a group of volcanoes of which Coranzulí is a part: the complex has produced large ignimbrite sheets with a combined volume approaching 15,000 cubic kilometres (3,600 cu mi).

Coranzulí and the majority of the Andean volcanoes formed from the subduction of the oceanic Nazca Plate under the continental South American continental lithosphere. The caldera was probably supplied by a pool of rhyodacitic and rhyolitic magma that formed at the intersection of several faults. It sits on a basement formed by Paleozoic to Miocene volcanic, granitic and sedimentary rocks.

The caldera was the source of four large ignimbrites, which were erupted during a single event 6.6 million years ago. The ignimbrites have spread around the caldera and have a total volume of 650 cubic kilometres (160 cu mi). After their emplacement, the caldera produced several lava flows; rocks within the caldera were uplifted to form the mountain Cerro Coranzulí.

== Geography and structure ==
Coranzulí lies in northwestern Jujuy Province, Argentina. The town of Coranzulí lies just west of the volcano, and Argentina's National Route 40 road passes through the town. Most economic activity in the area consists of herding with some agriculture. Research on the volcano commenced in 1926, and it has been identified as a potential source of geothermal energy and a potential mining location.

It is part of the Central Volcanic Zone (CVZ) of the Andes, which extends over southern Peru and Bolivia and northern Chile and Argentina. The caldera itself is about 140 kilometres (87 mi) east from the main volcanic arc. There, volcanic activity and compression resulting from the subduction of the Nazca Plate have built the Altiplano-Puna high plateau at 3,700 metres (12,100 ft) elevation, the second-largest and second-highest high plateau in the world after Tibet. Volcanism in northwestern Argentina occurs in two distinct belts, one along the border with Chile and the other within Argentina.

The caldera has been eroded and buried by lava domes, which obscure its shape; only at the western border can its margin be recognized. It has dimensions estimated at 14 by 14 kilometres (8.7 mi × 8.7 mi) or 16 by 12 kilometres (9.9 mi × 7.5 mi) and is mostly filled by a several hundred metres high resurgent dome consisting of hydrothermally altered ignimbrites, which reach thicknesses of about 500 metres (1,600 ft). The dome forms the 5,181 metres (16,998 ft) high peak named Cerro Coranzulí. Other peaks around Cerro Coranzulí are Cerro Moraya and Cerro Condor southeast and north of Cerro Coranzulí, respectively. Ignimbrites from the caldera cover an area of about 2,050 square kilometres (790 sq mi) and form mesa landscapes. Baños de Coranzulí is an active warm spring on the northwestern flank of Cerro Coranzulí at 4,060 metres (13,320 ft) elevation, producing about 0.42 cubic metres per second (15 cu ft/s) water at a temperature of 34 °C (93 °F). The Coranzulí river originates on the volcano and eventually joins the Las Burras river, which flows towards Laguna Guayatayoc-Salinas Grandes.

== Geology ==
Off the western coast of South America, the Nazca Plate subducts in the Peru-Chile Trench beneath the South American Plate at a rate of about 10 centimetres per year (3.9 in/year). The subduction is responsible for the volcanism of the CVZ. In the middle of the CVZ lies the Altiplano-Puna volcanic complex (APVC), a group of volcanoes (mostly calderas) that since the Miocene have produced about 15,000 cubic kilometres (3,600 cu mi) of mainly dacitic ignimbrites, each exceeding 100 cubic kilometres (24 cu mi) in volume. The volcanoes include Cerro Guacha, Cerro Panizos, Coranzulí, Kapina, La Pacana, Pastos Grandes and Vilama, as well as as-yet undiscovered but presumed buried calderas. The volcanoes are underpinned by a magma body in the crust, the Altiplano-Puna Magma Body, and the detachment and fall of parts of the lower crust into the mantle may have played a key role in its origin.

The basement under the caldera consists of granites and marine and continental (Salta Group) sediments containing volcanic intrusions, with ages ranging from the Paleozoic to Miocene. During the Cenozoic, these were covered by sandstones and volcanic rocks from volcanoes that were active before Coranzulí. Numerous fault systems cross the region and influence the location of the calderas; several such faults, such as the Coyaguayma, Ramallo and Doncellas faults, intersect at Coranzulí and formed the Carhuasi and Tanque mountains north and south of Coranzulí, respectively. Movement along these faults may have created a space where magmas could accumulate, thus forming the Coranzulí volcano. Some of these faults are linked to the northwest–southeast trending Coyaguayma Lineament. A 40 kilometres (25 mi) long northwest-trending lineament may link Coranzulí to the Abra Grande volcano.

Volcanic activity in the CVZ goes back 26 million years, while in the APVC it began 11 million years ago. Mountain uplift commenced during the Palaeogene and picked up steam during the Miocene; after about 8.8-7 million years ago tectonic activity decreased again, while volcanism continued into the Pleistocene and migrated westwards over time. The eruptions at Coranzulí were contemporaneous with activity at Vilama and Cerro Panizos, and were the last major tectonic and volcanic activity in this sector of the Puna.

=== Composition ===
The ignimbrites consist of dacite and rhyodacite which define a calc-alkaline peraluminous suite similar to that of other calderas in the region. They contain numerous crystals of biotite, feldspar, plagioclase and quartz. Amphibole, apatite, biotite, iron-titanium oxides, plagioclase, quartz, sanidine and zircon form phenocrysts; the dacitic lavas also contain hypersthene and rutile. Xenoliths include gneiss, Ordovician metapelites, pelites, quartzites, as well as dacitic lava fragments reaching 8 centimetres (3.1 in) size. The rocks contain arsenic, which is released through weathering and pollutes regional waterbodies. Springs have precipitated travertine.

The formation of the Coranzulí magmas commenced in mantle domains affected by subduction. The magmas ascended to the crust, where they underwent magma mixing, crust melting and fractional crystallization processes. Eventually they were stored in a homogeneous magma chamber before reaching the surface. The magmas reached temperatures of 840 °C (1,540 °F) in the chamber and did not cool down significantly before erupting on the surface. Despite their high volatile content inferred from the pumices, they were highly viscous owing to their crystal content, yielding dense flows that did not reach large heights. The ignimbrites have similar compositions.

== Climate and vegetation ==
The climate is cold and dry with extreme temperature variations. Annual precipitation does not exceed 350 millimetres (14 in) and falls mostly during summer. At Coranzulí town, monthly temperatures range from 3 °C (37 °F) in winter to 13 °C (55 °F) in summer. The region is a semidesert, most vegetation consists of bushy or grassy steppe except in wetlands. Plant species include Prosopis ferox, the tree Polylepis tomentella and the "tola" Parastrephia lepidophylla; the tree Polylepis tarapacana forms woodlands on Cerro Coranzulí. At the time of the caldera-forming eruption, the region may have hosted a lake.

== Eruption history ==
The Coranzulí caldera formed 6.6 million years ago in one eruption, which produced four ignimbrites, each from a separate part of the caldera. They consist of a combination of lithic breccias, volcanic ash and rarely pumice, forming typical ignimbrite facies. The bottom of each ignimbrite is dominated close to the caldera by lithics, but after a few kilometres fine ash becomes the most important constituent. The degree of welding increases upwards in the pile. The ignimbrites have a volume of about 650 cubic kilometres (160 cu mi) (supereruption size), voluminous enough to completely obliterate the previous topography (blocking the outlet of the Laguna Pozuelos basin). Some erosion may have taken place after their emplacement, removing parts of the ignimbrites and forming outcrops and dunes.

- The Abra Grande ignimbrite (Note: The ignimbrites are named Abra Grande, Potreros, Las Termas, and Corral de Sangre ignimbrites from bottom to top corresponding to the sequences 1, 2, 3 and 4. The maps also roughly correspond.) crops out far northwest from the caldera, having been buried elsewhere. It has an average thickness of 50 metres (160 ft) and reaches a distance of at least 28 kilometres (17 mi) from the caldera. The ignimbrite contains several facies with thicknesses of several metres, with colours ranging from yellow over greenish to grey.
- The Potreros ignimbrite covers large areas north-northeast, east-southeast, northwest and south of the caldera. It has its maximum thickness of 200 metres (660 ft) east of the caldera, and reaches distances of 45 kilometres (28 mi). Close to the caldera massive breccia is the most important facies; at larger distances fine grained units and massive ignimbrites become more important and form the bulk of this ignimbrite. It has a grey-to-pink colour. Pumice fragments are widespread and in some places have been melted, forming fiammes.
- The Las Termas ignimbrite is found due west and south of the caldera, with isolated outcrops east and southwest of Coranzulí. This ignimbrite has a mean thickness of 40 metres (130 ft) and extends to 37 kilometres (23 mi) from Coranzulí. Its base consists of breccia, but the bulk of this unit is a massive ignimbrite unit rich in pumices; there is a distinct pumice-rich facies. The ignimbrite has a grey-to-pink colour.
- Exposures of the Corral de Sangre ignimbrite are found in the southern part of the caldera, and 18 kilometres (11 mi) south of its margin. It consists of a basal, xenolith-rich breccia layer of pink colour overlaid by a massive ignimbrite unit of grey to white colour. They are rich in pumice and lithics, and there is a pumice-rich facies.

The onset of the eruption may have been triggered by movement along the faults around Coranzulí. The magma "boiled over", pulsating, producing ignimbrites which emanated from various vents along the margin of the caldera. Vent locations shifted during the course of the eruption, thus yielding four separate ignimbrite units from different sectors and depths of the volcanic system. The ignimbrites propagated away from Coranzulí at speeds of 7.3 metres per second (24 ft/s), with pumices floating on the flows. Like other eruptions in the Central Andes, the formation of Coranzulí was not accompanied by Plinian ash fallout, and eruption columns did not reach high elevations. Some ash deposits in the Coastal Cordillera of Chile have been tentatively associated with APVC volcanoes such as Coranzulí, however. Each eruption probably lasted five to 50 hours, with occasional pauses, and there is no evidence that significant breaks occurred between the emplacement of each ignimbrite.

Volcanic activity before caldera collapse produced ignimbrites, lava domes and block-and-ash flows that crop out north of Coranzulí. The Rachaite volcano east may also be linked to Coranzulí. After its collapse, green dacitic lava flows reaching thicknesses of 100 metres (330 ft) were emplaced within the caldera and surround Cerro Coranzulí. Rocks erupted by Coranzulí were in some places later buried by younger volcanoes, such as by Campanario and Cerro Negro. Hydrothermal activity took place at the northwestern side of Coranzulí, and there are active hot springs in the area.
