= Salar de Quisquiro =

Coordinates: 23°15′05″S 67°17′02″W

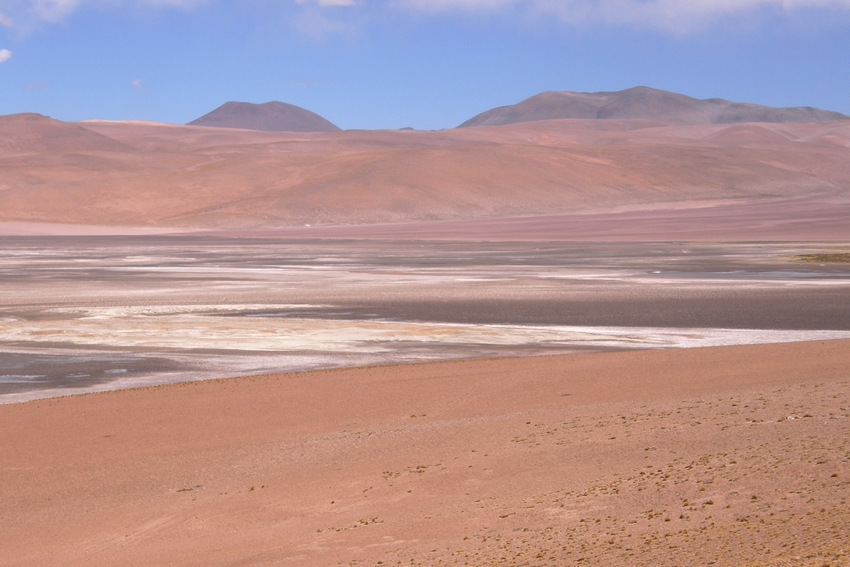
Photo taken from Chile Route 27, about 25 km (16 mi) from Paso de Jama

Salar de Quisquiro, also known as Salar de Loyoques, is a salt pan in northern Chile and covers an area of around 80 km^{2} (31 sq mi). The average surface elevation of its drainage basin is 4,430 m (14,530 ft), being the summit of Cerro Purifican at 5,285 m (17,339 ft), the highest point of this basin.

The salt pan is located within La Pacana caldera, south of Salar de Tara.
