= Los Frailes ignimbrite plateau =

Rock plateau in Bolivia

- Location within Bolivia

Highest point
- Coordinates: 19.5°S 66.3°W

Los Frailes is an ignimbrite plateau in Bolivia, between the city of Potosi and the Lake Poopo. It belongs to a group of ignimbrites that exist in the Central Andes and which includes the Altiplano–Puna volcanic complex. The plateau covers a surface of 7,500 square kilometres (2,900 sq mi)–8,500 square kilometres (3,300 sq mi) with about 2,000 cubic kilometres (480 cu mi) of ignimbrite.

The plateau features several putative vents, including Cerro Condor Nasa, Cerro Livicucho, Cerro Pascual Canaviri, Cerro Villacollo and Nuevo Mundo. The plateau was emplaced starting from 25 million years ago to the Holocene, when the Nuevo Mundo vent was active.

== Geography and geomorphology ==
Los Frailes lies in the Eastern Cordillera of Bolivia, between the southeastern shores of Lake Poopo and the city of Potosi. It is a little-studied volcanic system.

Los Frailes belongs to the Central Andean ignimbrites, which cover parts of southern Peru, southwestern Bolivia, northwestern Argentina and northeastern Chile and which contains the Altiplano–Puna volcanic complex. Ignimbrites do not cover all of the terrain there, however, and in some places there is more than one ignimbrite. Where ignimbrites get emplaced is controlled by crustal fractures and lineaments, which are not always visible on the surface. Some better studied volcanic centres are Galán and Cerro Guacha.

The Los Frailes ignimbrite plateau covers a heart-shaped area of about 7,500 square kilometres (2,900 sq mi) or 8,500 square kilometres (3,300 sq mi), which makes it one of the largest such plateaus in the world. The plateau has an average elevation of 4,000 metres (13,000 ft)-4,500 metres (14,800 ft). It was emplaced over a pre-existent topography, which resulted in the ignimbrites having irregular thicknesses; they reach maxima of 1 kilometre (0.62 mi) but on average the thickness is about 100 metres (330 ft). They consist of mostly welded tuffs with column-like joint structures; a total volume of 2,000 cubic kilometres (480 cu mi) has been estimated for the plateau, which is a large size.

Several potential vents have been identified, such as Cerro Condor Nasa and Cerro Livicucho (both of which appear to be circular structures with post-ignimbrite extrusions) in the northern part of the field, the Huanapampa lava dome complex in the central part of the field and Cerro Pascual Canaviri, Cerro Villacollo and Nuevo Mundo in its southern part. Cerro Villacollo in the western sector of the plateau is an eroded composite volcano with a 200–600 metres (660–1,970 ft) deep and 3 kilometres (1.9 mi) wide collapse structure, and is accompanied by dacitic lava flows, whereas Cerro Pascual Canaviri and Nuevo Mundo are complexes of lava domes, the latter of which also contains ash deposits that have been in part transported away by wind. Lava domes and lava flows are widespread on their surface, and some volcanic necks contain mineral deposits.

== Geology ==
At least since the Jurassic, the Nazca Plate has been subducting beneath the South America Plate at a rate of about 80 millimetres per year (3.1 in/year). Volcanism does not occur along the entire length of the subduction zone; where the subducting plate descends into the mantle at a shallow angle volcanism is absent. There are thus three volcanic zones in South America, the Northern Volcanic Zone, the Central Volcanic Zone and the Southern Volcanic Zone. An additional volcanic belt, the Austral Volcanic Zone, is controlled by the subduction of the Antarctic Plate beneath the South America Plate.

The Los Frailes ignimbrite plateau lies about 270 kilometres (170 mi) east of the actual volcanic arc. The remoteness of many volcanic formations of the Central Andes and the often hostile weather conditions mean that many volcanic formations are poorly investigated.

The basement beneath Los Frailes is of Paleozoic–Mesozoic age and covered by Miocene andesitic-dacitic volcanics; some of these have been dated to 11.6 and 20 million years ago. The terrain was heavily dissected when eruptive activity began. Pre-existent cracks in this basement may have formed the pathways for the magma that eventually gave rise to the Los Frailes ignimbrite to ascend. The onset of volcanic activity may ultimately be due to changes in the regional tectonic regime, such as the delamination of part of the lower crust and a change in the inclination of the subducting slab, but the relative importance of the upper and lower crust and mantle are unclear.

=== Composition ===
Los Frailes has erupted rocks ranging from andesite to rhyolite. The main ignimbrite is of rhyodacitic composition and contains phenocrysts consisting of apatite containing monazite and zircon, biotite, ilmenite, orthoclase, plagioclase and quartz. Silver-tin deposits occur in the volcanic field, including the Cerro Rico stock that was a principal source of silver to the Spanish Empire. The magmas appear to be partially derived from the mantle and partially as crustal melts, similar to other Central Andean ignimbrites.

== Eruption history ==
The Los Frailes ignimbrites were erupted between about 25 or 13 and 2 million years ago, but volcanism associated with the plateau goes back 25 million years, whereas the youngest ignimbrite is dated to 1.52–1.522 million years ago. Several different stages of volcanic activity have been distinguished.

- In the oldest stage of activity, the San Pablo and Kari-Kari systems were active. Between 26 and 25 million years ago the Kumurana granodiorite was emplaced south of the subsequent Kari-Kari complex.
- The Cantería ignimbrite was produced 21.9 million years ago, the Azanaques volcano-plutonic complex 20.96 million years ago and the Agua Dulce ignimbrite 20.9 million years ago. Cerro Gordo was active 19.7 ± 0.6 million years ago.
- Between 16–10.4 million years ago volcanism occurred at Cerro Carguaicollo as well as the Corona-Anaruyo and Larco ignimbrites, the last of which was erupted 16 ± 2 million years ago. Cerro Carguaicollo is dated to 10.45 ± 0.47 million years ago. Another centre, Cerro Sombrero Kollu, was active 11 million years ago.
- The Condor Nasa-Livicucho system was active between 7 and 8 million years ago, while the main ignimbrite was emplaced about 2-1 million years ago.

After the emplacement of the ignimbrites, lava domes and resurgent domes continued the volcanic activity in Los Frailes. Nuevo Mundo is the youngest eruptive system of the Los Frailes plateau; based on the position of its lavas with respect to moraines it must have been active within the last 11,000 years in the Holocene, perhaps even in prehistoric time. Surface exposure dating has yielded an age of about 11,700 for the northern Nuevo Mundo dome.
