= Pairique volcanic complex =

Landmark

Coordinates: 22°55′S 66°50′W

Pairique volcanic complex is a volcanic complex in the Jujuy Province, Argentina.

The volcano features are what was once thought to be a caldera, which contributed to the formation of regional ignimbrites of dacitic to rhyolitic composition. Later it was found that the volcanic complex is better described as a semicircular group of lava domes. These were emplaced on older and partly eroded lava flows. These domes in clockwise direction are known as Cerro Lucho, Cerro Lucha, Cerro Agua Dulce and Cerro Pairique Chico and rise 50–700 metres (160–2,300 ft) above the Bajo de Pairique, the centre of the 8 kilometres (5.0 mi) wide semicircle. Most of these domes have been affected by lateral or centre-ward sector collapses. Eruption products associated with Pairique are the Pairique Chico block and ash flow, the Arco Jara ignimbrite and the Cerro Lucho lavas. All of these do not exceed 5 cubic kilometres (1.2 cu mi) of volume. Right-lateral faults have affected the area.

Pairique formed during the late Miocene between 8 and 6.7 million years ago, when volcanism reactivated on the Argentine side of the Puna. Later dates imply volcanic activity between 11.5 and 10.3 million years ago. Pairique is part of the Altiplano-Puna volcanic complex, although the volcanic eruptions of Pairique were less extensive than these from many other APVC volcanoes. Pairique is often considered to be the oldest caldera of the APVC.

The younger Cerro Morado volcanic centre is close. It erupted later than Pairique. The ignimbrites of Cerro Guacha and Coranzuli crop out northwest and east of Pairique, respectively. Some volcanic rocks once attributed to Pairique seem to come from neighbouring volcanic centres such as Lina, Nevado Torona-San Pedro and Pairique Grande.

The non-volcanic basement is formed by the Ordovician sediments which crop out in neighbouring mountain ranges, and by the Tertiary Peña Colorada formation. The Rio Pairique originates within the volcanic complex and together with the Rio Aguas Calientes from the northwest forms the Rio Rosario, which drains to the southeast. Hot springs with temperatures of 35–62 °C (95–144 °F) occur at Pairique and appear to be connected to mantle degassing.

Volcanic rocks at Pairique include dacite with cordierite inclusions. Older lavas feature rhyodacite intrusions. Mineral deposits are associated with Pairique, including Salar de Olaroz; the Rosario river, its main tributary, originates at Pairique.
