= Tastil volcanic complex =

Volcanic group in Argentina

Coordinates: 24°45′S 65°53′W

Tastil volcanic complex is a volcanic group in Argentina.

Subduction off the western coast of South America has been ongoing since the Jurassic and beginning with the Oligocene led to volcanism in the Puna de Atacama region, which became particularly intense 10 million years ago. Some of this volcanism was focused along faults that run perpendicular/diagonal to the subduction zone such as the Calama-Olacapato-El Toro fault; the volcanoes Cerro Tuzgle and Tastil volcanic complex are among them.

The Tastil volcanic complex is constructed in the Eastern Cordillera, at the margin between a basement made by Precambrian-Cambrian sediments and plutons and Tertiary sediments. The complex consists of dykes and lava flows which are of Miocene age. The volcanic complex has erupted potassium-rich calc-alkaline rocks ranging from basaltic andesite to dacite; isotope ratios in the rocks indicate a strong crustal influence in the geochemistry.
