= Resurgent dome =

Volcanic landform

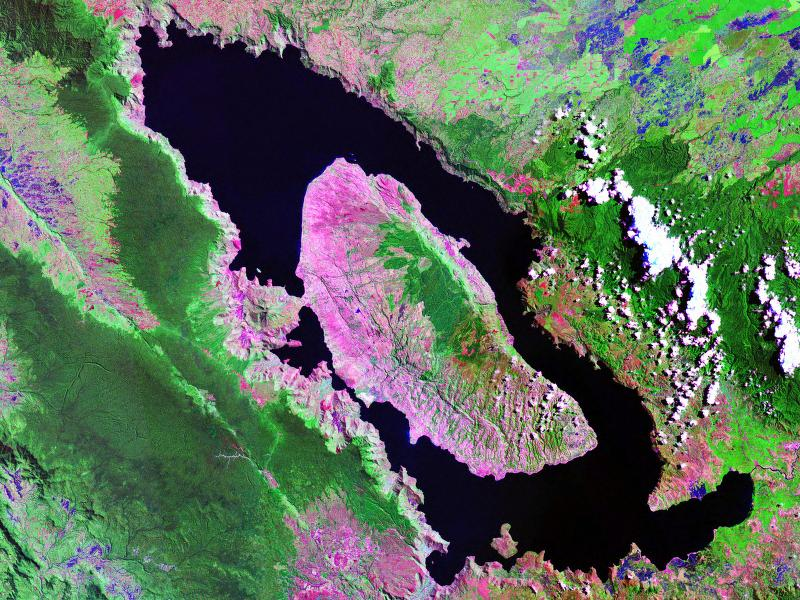
The caldera of Lake Toba, with a resurgent dome, forming Samosir Island.

In geology, a resurgent dome is a dome formed by swelling or rising of a caldera floor due to movement in the magma chamber beneath it. Unlike a lava dome, a resurgent dome is not formed by the extrusion of highly viscous lava onto the surface, but rather by the uplift and deformation of the surface itself by magma movement underground. Resurgent domes are typically found near the center of very large open calderas such as Yellowstone Caldera or Valles Caldera, and in turn such calderas are often referred to as "resurgent-type" calderas to distinguish them from the more common (but much smaller) calderas found on shield volcanoes and stratovolcanoes.

The structure that makes a resurgent dome possible is a fracture zone made up of ring faults surrounded by concentric normal faults around the outside of the rings. During initial formation of the caldera these ring faults provide vents for ash-flow eruptions and are the point at which subsidence of the cauldron block occurs. Subsequent magma flows then push the cauldron block back up creating the dome.

In the monitoring of volcanic hazards, resurgent domes are often intensively monitored, as an ongoing increase in elevation accompanied by seismic activity is certain evidence for magma rising beneath the surface.

== Examples of calderas with resurgent domes ==
- Bennett Lake Volcanic Complex, British Columbia and Yukon, Canada
- Blake River Megacaldera Complex, Ontario and Quebec, Canada
- Cheeseman Island and Curtis Island, Kermadec Islands, New Zealand
- Chiqllarasu, Ayacucho, Peru
- Coranzulí, Jujuy, Argentina
- Los Frailes ignimbrite plateau, Bolivia
- Galán, Catamarca, Argentina
- La Garita Caldera, Colorado, United States
- Cerro Guacha, Sur Lípez, Bolivia
- Ischia, Phlegraean Islands, Campania, Italy
- Iwo Jima, Bonin Islands, Japan
- Kari-Kari, Potosí, Bolivia
- Kemp Caldera, South Sandwich Islands
- Koʻolau Caldera, Oʻahu, Hawaii, United States
- Kurile Lake, Kamchatka, Russia
- El Laco, Antofagasta, Chile
- Long Valley Caldera, California, United States
- Monowai, Kermadec Ridge, New Zealand
- Morococala, Oruro, Bolivia
- La Pacana, Antofagasta, Chile
- Pastos Grandes, Sur Lípez, Bolivia
- La Reforma, Baja California, Mexico
- Lake Taupō, North Island, New Zealand
- Timber Mountain Caldera, Nevada, United States
- Lake Toba, Sumatra, Indonesia
- Taal Caldera, Luzon, Philippines
- Valles Caldera, New Mexico, United States
- Vilama, Argentina and Bolivia
- Yellowstone Caldera, Wyoming, United States
