= Ramadas Volcanic Centre =

Coordinates: 24°08′3″S 66°20′57.1″W

Ramadas Volcanic Centre is a volcano in northeastern Argentina. It is the source of a widespread explosive eruption deposit in northeastern Argentina, the Corte Blanco Tuff which was erupted 8.73 ± 0.25 million years ago. Perlite occurs at the volcanic centre and is actively mined.

== Geology and geomorphology ==
=== Regional ===
The volcano lies 10 kilometres (6.2 mi) north of the town of San Antonio de Los Cobres. It is part of the Central Volcanic Zone of the Andes, a belt of volcanoes spanning Peru, Bolivia, Chile and Argentina. The Central Volcanic Zone includes the Altiplano-Puna volcanic complex, where during the late Miocene large explosive eruptions of silicic composition occurred; Ramadas is part of this volcanic complex. The basement beneath Ramadas is formed by the Puncoviscana Formation of Precambrian-Cambrian age and the site of the volcano coincides with a fault.

The region is formed by the Puna high plateau, the Eastern Cordillera and the Subandean Ranges, the first of which is delimited by faults. Summits within the active volcanic arc can reach elevations of over 5,000 metres (16,000 ft).

=== Local ===
Ramadas lies at an altitude of 3,800 metres (12,500 ft) and is formed by a 3 by 4 kilometres (1.9 mi × 2.5 mi) wide amphitheatre like structure, which has been interpreted as a tuff ring. Much of the volcano is buried by more recent rocks, rendering it difficult to visualize. A rhyolitic lava dome-like structure with dimensions of 100–50 metres (330–160 ft) is located at the centre. Presently, streams cross the areal.

== Eruption history ==
Ramadas is an isolated monogenetic volcano. It is the origin of the Corte Blanco Tuff deposit, a widespread formation generated by a Plinian eruption. This eruption deposited large amounts of pumice and smaller amounts of ignimbrite and pyroclastic surge mainly to the east of the vent. The eruption left fallout as far as 400 kilometres (250 mi) away, the total volume of the deposits is over 35 cubic kilometres (8.4 cu mi). After an initially intense explosive eruption, phreatomagmatic deposits and obsidian were emplaced within a depression that appears to be a caldera. Potassium-argon dating has yielded an age of 8.73 ± 0.25 million years ago for this eruption.

== Petrology ==
The Corte Blanco Tuff is formed by a peraluminous rhyolite. Red garnet occurs in the form of crystals within the rhyolite; other mineral inclusions are biotite, feldspar, quartz and tourmaline. Monazite and zircon have also been observed.

The Ramadas Volcanic Centre is known for the unusual presence of several formations of perlite-bearing rocks, including a lapilli rich one. This perlite has been quarryed, with two active quarries including Don Joaquin and El Sol.
