= La Pacana =

Large Miocene-age caldera in northern Chile

Pacana Caldera
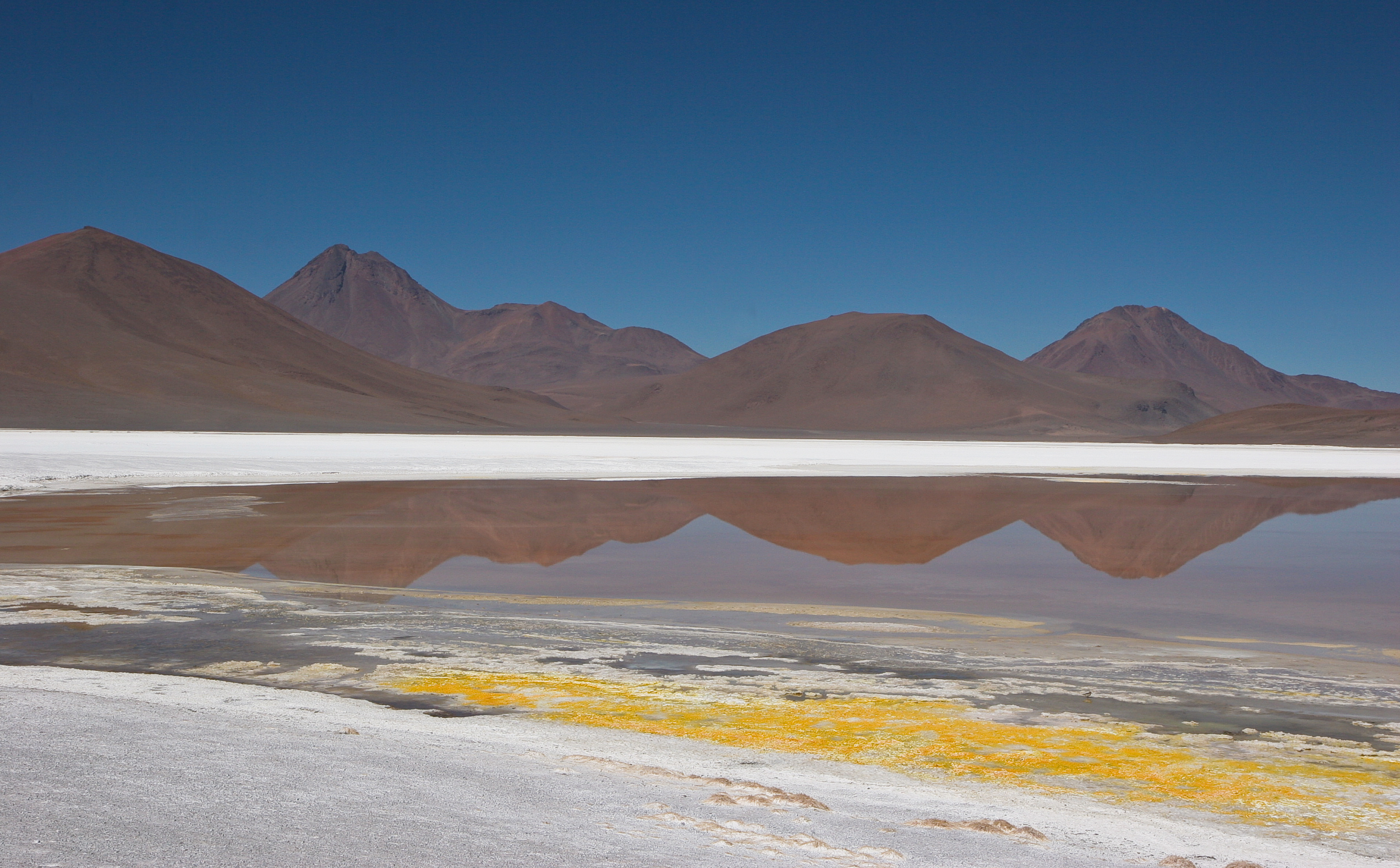
- Viewing from inside the caldera towards the western margin

Highest point
- Elevation: 4,500 m (14,800 ft)
- Listing: List of volcanoes in Chile
- Coordinates: 23°13′11″S 67°27′58″W

Geography
- Location within Chile
- Location: Northern Chile

Geology
- Mountain type: Caldera
- Volcanic zone: Altiplano–Puna volcanic complex
- Last eruption: 2 mya

La Pacana is a Miocene age caldera in northern Chile's Antofagasta Region. Part of the Central Volcanic Zone of the Andes, it is part of the Altiplano-Puna volcanic complex, a major caldera and silicic ignimbrite volcanic field. This volcanic field is located in remote regions at the Zapaleri tripoint between Chile, Bolivia and Argentina.

La Pacana along with other regional volcanoes was formed by the subduction of the Nazca Plate beneath the South American Plate in the Peru-Chile Trench. La Pacana is situated in a basement formed by various Paleozoic formations and Tertiary ignimbrites and volcanoes. Several major faults cross the region at La Pacana and have influenced its volcanic activity.

La Pacana is a supervolcano and is responsible for the eruption of the giant Atana ignimbrite, which reaches a volume of 2,500–3,500 cubic kilometres (600–840 cu mi) and constitutes the fifth-largest explosive eruption known. The Atana ignimbrite was erupted 3.8 ± 0.1 and 4.2 ± 0.1 million years ago, almost simultaneously with the much smaller (volume of 180 cubic kilometres (43 cu mi)) Toconao ignimbrite. The Pujsa ignimbrite was erupted by La Pacana before the Atana/Toconao ignimbrites, and the Filo Delgado and Pampa Chamaca/Talabre ignimbrites afterwards.

== Geography and structure ==
La Pacana lies in the Antofagasta Region of Chile, in the Andes just north of the Tropic of Capricorn and close to the Paso de Jama between Chile and Argentina. The border between Chile and Bolivia crosses the northern sector of the caldera. The area of La Pacana is largely uninhabitated; small settlements such as Socaire, Talabre and Toconao exist close to the Salar de Atacama, where streams descend the mountain slopes to the salar. The caldera was discovered during mapping efforts in the region between 1980 and 1985.

La Pacana is part of the Central Volcanic Zone, one of the four volcanic zones that make up the Andean Volcanic Belt and which are separated from each other by gaps without ongoing volcanic activity. A number of stratovolcanoes and ignimbrite-forming centres have erupted in the Central Volcanic Zone since the Miocene, about 50 of which are considered to be active. In addition, the Central Volcanic Zone features about 18 minor volcanic fields. The largest historical eruption of the Andes occurred in 1600 at Huaynaputina in Peru in the Central Volcanic Zone, and the most active volcano of the Central Volcanic Zone is Láscar in Chile.

La Pacana has a diameter of 60 by 35 kilometres (37 mi × 22 mi) with a north–south elongation. This is one of the best exposed and largest calderas in the world; the largest caldera known is Toba in Sumatra with a maximum length of 100 kilometres (62 mi). La Pacana might not be a single caldera; some reconstructions imply that the northern parts of the caldera are actually a separate collapse structure. The floor of the caldera lies at an elevation of 4,200–4,500 metres (13,800–14,800 ft), the central uplift and the caldera rim are higher and reach 5,200 metres (17,100 ft). The caldera rim is well exposed except in the northern and western sides, where later volcanism has buried it. After the formation of the caldera, sediments and tuffs within the caldera were uplifted over an angular area of 350 square kilometres (140 sq mi), forming the 1 kilometre (0.62 mi) high resurgent dome known as Cordón La Pacana. This resurgent dome is cut by numerous faults and features a poorly developed graben on its summit. Originally it was believed that the present-day calder rim did not coincide with the caldera ring fault, which was instead identified to coincide with margins of the resurgent dome; later research however indicates the present-day topographic margin as the caldera edge. The resurgent dome is separated from the caldera rim by a 2–10 kilometres (1.2–6.2 mi) wide moat that makes up about two thirds of the entire surface of the caldera, but is interrupted on the northern side of the caldera by the "hinge" of the caldera collapse, which assumed the form of a trap-door. The moat is filled by sediments formed by erosion and by alluvial, evaporite and lacustrine sediments left behind by lakes.

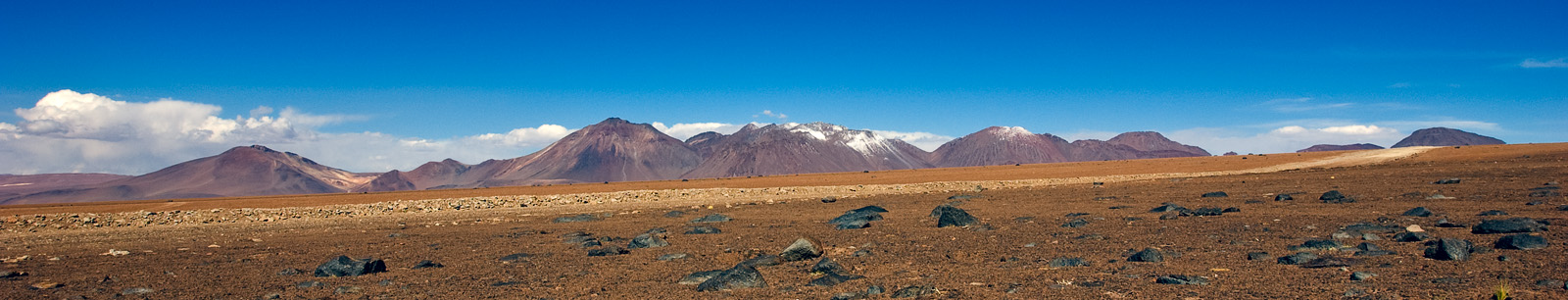
The Guayaques volcanic group

The collapse of the caldera cut through older volcanic centres, exposing the Ceja Alta and Quilapana porphyry deposits. Other older volcanic centres exposed in the walls of the caldera are the Cerro Aguas Calientes stratovolcano in the eastern wall and the Cerro Gigantes in the western wall. Volcanic activity resumed within the caldera and at the edge of the resurgent dome, forming lava domes between 4.1 and at least 1.6 million years ago. These volcanic centres include the Corral de Coquena crater and the lava domes of Morro Negro east, Cerro Bola and Purifican west and Cerros de Guayaques north of the resurgent dome. The Arenoso, Chamaca and Chivato Muerto lava domes in the southern wall of the caldera were originally considered to be pre-caldera; later these three domes were identified as post-caldera domes. Stratovolcanoes inside the caldera include the cones associated with the Cerros de Guayaques lava domes and the volcanoes Cerro Incaguasi, Cerros de Pili, Cerros Negros and Huailitas.

Some extant hot springs within the caldera may indicate that there is still a geothermal system associated with La Pacana, although not a very important one considering their low temperature (less than 25 °C (77 °F)). A few lakes such as the spring-fed Laguna de Chivato Muerto, Laguna Trinchera and Ojos del Rió Salado, as well as salt pans such as Salar de Aguas Calientes Norte, Salar de Aguas Calientes Sur, Salar de Pujsa and Salar de Quisquiro have developed within the moat. The waterbodies in the southern part of the caldera appear to be connected through groundwater, as they have similar water levels. The western caldera rim itself impedes the groundwater from draining out of the caldera. Streams such as Río de Pili and Río Salado complete the hydrology of the caldera.

Gravimetric observations have been conducted on La Pacana. A large negative anomaly (an anomaly with less-than-expected mass crust) coincides with the surface of the La Pacana caldera and extends past its borders; it may be a consequence of the caldera being infilled with low-density material. Positive anomalies (anomalies with more-than-expected mass in the crust) are found in the areas surrounding the caldera and dot discrete zones within it; the former represent the dense basement and the latter may be intrusions associated with individual vents.

== Geology ==
In the Peru-Chile Trench, the Nazca Plate subducts beneath the South American Plate at a rate of about 7–9 centimetres per year (2.8–3.5 in/year), leading to volcanic activity at distances of 130–160 kilometres (81–99 mi) from the trench.

Research indicates that subduction has been ongoing since the Jurassic 200 million years ago but accelerated 26 million years ago. After a phase of andesitic volcanism lasting from the late Tertiary to the Miocene, large scale ignimbritic volcanism commenced about 23 million years ago and is still ongoing. It began north of 21° southern latitude with the 23-18 million years old Oxaya formation and the 15–17 million years old Altos de Pica formation. Later the San Bartolo and Silapeti groups were generated, ending by the early Pleistocene. Volcanic activity at La Pacana is more recent than elsewhere in the region, with the oldest volcanic rocks that crop out in La Pacana being between 11 and 7.5 million years old. Large scale ignimbritic activity continued until 2 million years ago.

=== Regional ===
The Central Andes are the site of extensive ignimbrites that were erupted from large calderas usually located within the adjacent Altiplano, east of the principal volcanic arc. Many of these calderas are part of the Altiplano-Puna volcanic complex, a large volcanic complex covering a surface area of 70,000 square kilometres (27,000 sq mi) with about 30,000 cubic kilometres (7,200 cu mi) of ignimbrites. La Pacana is the largest caldera of the Altiplano-Puna volcanic complex. The ignimbrites form a surface that lies at an average elevation of 4,000 metres (13,000 ft). Stratovolcanoes developed on top of these ignimbrite sheets and today form the most clear expression of volcanic activity in the region, with some of them exceeding the height of 6,000 metres (20,000 ft) above sea level. The long-lasting dry climate means that traces of volcanic activity can be recognizable over long timeframes.

The Altiplano-Puna volcanic complex is underpinned by a large seismic velocity anomaly at a depth of 20 kilometres (12 mi), which may be the largest structure consisting of near-molten (10–20%) rock on Earth. This partial melt zone was formed by the injection of mafic magmas into the lower crust; a major episode of overturning before 10.6 million years ago caused crustal anatexis and started the onset of ignimbritic volcanism. Magmas formed within this melt zone rose into the upper crust and differentiated between depths of 8–4 kilometres (5.0–2.5 mi) to form the ignimbrite-forming secondary magmas. Presently, the inferred margin of this partially molten zone coincides fairly well with a negative gravimetric anomaly that clusters around the tripoint between Argentina, Bolivia and Chile and with the extent of the Altiplano-Puna volcanic complex.

=== Local ===
The basement beneath La Pacana is formed by sediments of Ordovician age, Devonian-Permian quartzites, the mixed Salta formation also of Permian age and sediments of Cretaceous-Tertiary age. At the eastern margin of La Pacana in Argentina, they overlay an even older Precambrian basement. Most of this original basement however is covered by Miocene ignimbrites from centres that may coincide with the La Pacana caldera. Two of these older ignimbrites are known as the Pampa Múcar and Antigua Chacaliri ignimbrites.

La Pacana together with the Cerro Guacha and Purico Complex calderas forms the La Pacana Complex. Guacha experienced two major eruptions, of which one occurred 4.1 million years ago. The Purico complex began erupting 1.3 million years ago; it is the youngest centre of the La Pacana Complex with the youngest eruptions occurring during the Holocene. Additional volcanic centres west and southwest of La Pacana are Acamarachi, Láscar, Colachi and Cordón de Puntas Negras.

A number of faults transect the region at La Pacana, including the north-south Miscanti Lineament and the Socompa and Quisiquiro lineaments. These lineaments or faults have influenced volcanism and geomorphology in the region, with volcanoes and vents aligning along these lineaments.

=== Composition ===
The Toconao and Atana ignimbrites are formed by rhyolite and dacite-rhyodacite, respectively. They form a potassium-rich calc-alkaline suite. Both contain pumices, three different types of which are found in the Atana ignimbrite. Phenocrysts within the ignimbrite are chiefly formed by plagioclase.

Both the Atana and the Toconao ignimbrite include minerals like allanite, apatite, biotite, epidote, hornblende, ilmenite, magnetite, monazite, orthopyroxene, plagioclase, quartz, sanidine, titanite and zircon. Not all of these minerals are found in both ignimbrites, and not always in the same phase (crystals or matrix).

Ultimately, the magmas at La Pacana are the products of mantle melts interacting with various crustal domains deep in the crust, within the partially molten zone that has been found at depths of c. 20 kilometres (12 mi) beneath the Altiplano-Puna volcanic complex.

Various geothermometers indicate that the Toconao ignimbrite was colder than the Atana ignimbrite; temperatures have been estimated at 730–750 °C (1,350–1,380 °F) and 750–790 °C (1,380–1,450 °F) respectively. While the depth at which the Toconao ignimbrite formed is unknown, the Atana ignimbrite formed at a depth of 7–8.5 kilometres (4.3–5.3 mi). Such a formation depth is comparable to depths estimated for other magmatic systems such as Fish Canyon, Long Valley and Yellowstone.

== Climate and biota ==
Weather records are available for the Salar de Aguas Calientes. There, an average temperature of 1 °C (34 °F) and average precipitation of 150 millimetres per year (5.9 in/year) have been recorded.

There is little vegetation in the dry Altiplano. Nevertheless, a number of animal species are found, such as rheas, vicuñas and vizcachas. Ducks, geese and flamingos frequent waterbodies and salars.

== Eruption history ==
La Pacana has erupted two ignimbrites which differ in composition and were emplaced one shortly after the other: The dacitic Atana ignimbrite and the rhyolitic Toconao ignimbrite. The Atana ignimbrite was once considered part of the Guaitiquina ignimbrite, which was later split off, while the Puripicar ignimbrite may be correlated with the Atana instead. Also, some of the ignimbrites erupted by La Pacana originally were attributed to Cerro Guacha. Both ignimbrites originated from different parts of the same magma chamber and their origin in the La Pacana caldera is established by isotope ratios of the rocks and the geographical distribution of their outcrops. Pyroclastic deposits in the Eastern Cordillera of Argentina may have their origin at La Pacana.

Before the eruption of the Toconao and Atana ignimbrites, early activity generated the Pujsa ignimbrite between 5.8 ± 0.1 and 5.7 ± 0.4 million years ago and some stratovolcanoes and porphyries that are cut by the caldera walls. The Pujsa ignimbrite resembles the Atana ignimbrite and like the Toconao ignimbrite is mainly exposed on the western side of the caldera.

The first large eruption, which took place between 4 ± 0.9 and 5.3 ± 1.1 million years ago, formed the Toconao ignimbrite. The Toconao ignimbrite crops out mainly west of the caldera; only later were units of the Toconao identified on the eastern side of La Pacana. This ignimbrite has a volume of approximately 180 cubic kilometres (43 cu mi) and is formed by a lower un-indurated and an upper indurated subunit. Tube pumices are contained in the lower subunit and in a less than 10 centimetres (3.9 in) Plinian deposit that was emplaced beneath the Toconao ignimbrite.

The formation of the caldera coincided with the eruption of the Atana ignimbrite; the eruption was still underway when the terrain subsided to a depth of 2–3 kilometres (1.2–1.9 mi) beneath the previous surface in the northwestern segment of La Pacana. Dates obtained on the Atana ignimbrite are between 3.8 ± 0.1 and 4.2 ± 0.1 million years ago, which is not clearly distinguishable from the dates of the Toconao ignimbrite seeing as there is no indication that a pause occurred between the eruption of the two ignimbrites. This ignimbrite is considerably larger than the Toconao ignimbrite, reaching a volume of 2,500–3,500 cubic kilometres (600–840 cu mi) and a volcanic explosivity index of 8. This makes the Atana eruption the fifth-largest explosive eruption known and La Pacana a supervolcano. The Atana ignimbrite forms a flow sheet that extends from within the caldera to the outside in the form of a 30–40 metres (98–131 ft) thick structure. This flow sheet originally probably covered a surface area of about 7,700 square kilometres (3,000 sq mi), part of which was later eroded away. The Atana ignimbrite is fairly welded, rich in crystals and poor in lithics. It is underlaid by pumice and ash deposits. Pumice is also found as fragments within the ignimbrite, ranging from white rhyolite to gray andesite. After its eruption, wind and water driven erosion occurred on the Atana ignimbrite, carving valleys and yardangs into it.

Some differences exist between the facies of the ignimbrite inside and outside of the caldera, as well as between the western and eastern outcrops. Such differences concern the degree of welding of the ignimbrite, the occurrence or absence of devitrification and the jointing patterns. In fact, a segment of the northern Atana ignimbrite was later considered to not be actually part of the Atana ignimbrite at all because of the different facies and petrology. This separate ignimbrite was christened to be an upper and a lower Tara ignimbrite, possibly erupted by the Cerro Guacha caldera. The Tara ignimbrite fills part of the La Pacana caldera. The total volume of the La Pacana ignimbrites proper is estimated to be about 3,400–3,500 cubic kilometres (820–840 cu mi), on the basis of gravimetric information about the volume of the caldera and the infill ignimbrites.

The most likely theory for the origin of both Atana and Toconao ignimbrites is that they formed by crystal fractionation within a magma chamber, where the Toconao magma was extracted from convecting dacitic magma that was undergoing crystallization. This volatile-rich and crystal-poor extracted magma erupted first as a Plinian eruption. Then a tectonic event, most likely a movement along a fault cutting through the caldera, prompted the rise and eruption of the Atana ignimbrite. Two potential vents have been found at the northern and western margins of the caldera, where breccia deposits occur within the Atana ignimbrite. Some of the magma that gave rise to the Atana ignimbrite was erupted after the ignimbrite; the lava domes formed after the caldera collapse were generated by this magma. This category of dependent postcaldera volcanism includes Corral de Coquena and Morro Negro; other postcaldera volcanic centres have different compositions and thus probably formed from different sources than the Atana magma.

Ignimbrite eruptions continued after the formation of the caldera. The Filo Delgado ignimbrite was erupted at some time during the Pliocene from the Huailitas volcano. Its volume is about 0.1 cubic kilometres (0.024 cu mi). 2.4 ± 0.4 million years ago, the Pampa Chamaca ignimbrite filled the moat between the resurgent dome and the caldera rim. The Pampa Chamaca or Talabre ignimbrite was erupted from a vent probably buried beneath the present-day Cordon de Puntas Negras or the Salar de Aguas Calientes and reached a volume of about 0.5 cubic kilometres (0.12 cu mi). The 3.49 million years old Tara Ignimbrite from the Cerro Guacha caldera reached the northern margin of La Pacana.
