= Cerro Guacha =

Miocene caldera in southwestern Bolivia, in the Andes

- Location within Bolivia

Highest point
- Coordinates: 22°45′S 67°28′W

Naming
- Language of name: Spanish

Cerro Guacha is a Miocene caldera in southwestern Bolivia's Sur Lípez Province. Part of the volcanic system of the Andes, it is considered to be part of the Central Volcanic Zone (CVZ), one of the three volcanic arcs of the Andes, and its associated Altiplano-Puna volcanic complex (APVC). A number of volcanic calderas occur within the latter.

Cerro Guacha and the other volcanoes of that region are formed from the subduction of the Nazca Plate beneath the South American Plate. Above the subduction zone, the crust is chemically modified and generates large volumes of melts that form the local caldera systems of the APVC. Guacha is constructed over a basement of sediments.

Two major ignimbrites, the 5.6-5.8 mya Guacha ignimbrite with a volume of 1,300 cubic kilometres (310 cu mi) and the 3.5-3.6 mya Tara ignimbrite with a volume of 800 cubic kilometres (190 cu mi) were erupted from Cerro Guacha. More recent activity occurred 1.7 mya and formed a smaller ignimbrite with a volume of 10 cubic kilometres (2.4 cu mi).

The larger caldera has dimensions of 60 by 40 kilometres (37 mi × 25 mi) with a rim altitude of 5,250 metres (17,220 ft). Extended volcanic activity has generated two nested calderas, a number of lava domes and lava flows and a central resurgent dome.

== Geography and structure ==
The volcano is in Bolivia's Sur Lipez Province, 30 kilometres (19 mi) northwest from Zapaleri where the tripoint between Bolivia, Argentina and Chile is. The region lies at 3,000–4,000 metres (9,800–13,100 ft) altitude and is difficult to access, with the terrain compared to Mars. Several calderas there have been discovered through satellite imaging, including Cerro Guacha in 1978 from Landsat images. The caldera was named after Cerro Guacha, a feature in its area displayed by topographic maps. The Piedras de Dali hoodoos, named like that by tourists because of their surreal landscape, are formed by rocks from Puripicar Chico ignimbrite of the Guacha volcano.

The caldera covers an area of about 50 by 30 kilometres (31 mi × 19 mi), making it one of the largest on Earth. There are two scarps on the eastern side of the inferred caldera, each about 300–500 metres (980–1,640 ft) high. They are discontinuous, indicating that the caldera collapse was uneven around its circumference, and their occurrence only on the eastern side of the caldera implies that the collapse was trapdoor-like, with the eastern side dropping. The caldera is about 1 kilometre (0.62 mi) deep beneath its rim and filled by about the same thickness of ignimbrites; the caldera is a flat terrain rather than a recognizable depression. The caldera rim reaches 5,250 metres (17,220 ft) altitude presumably at Cerro Cojina; to its outside are ignimbrites that rise above the surroundings. The caldera landscape is partially visible from the Purico volcano.

The 5,599 metres (18,369 ft) high Cerro Guacha is the highest structure of the caldera; it is a resurgent dome that rises about 1.1 kilometres (0.68 mi) above the caldera floor and is cut by at least two grabens and several normal faults. The grabens separate Cerro Filo Guacha in the north from Cerro Huayllas in the south. The western part of the dome is formed by the Tara ignimbrite while the eastern is part of the Guacha ignimbrite. The Tara collapse cut through the dome, exposing 700 metres (2,300 ft) of Guacha ignimbrites. Three lava domes, roughly coeval with the Tara ignimbrite, are constructed on the northern side of the resurgent dome. The western dome is named Chajnantor and is the most silica-rich of the domes. Rio Guacha in the middle is more dacitic. The easternmost dome is known as Chajnantor Lava. Other lava domes include Cerro Tortoral (also spelled Cerro Tororal) on the northeastern rim and the Amargo complex west of the resurgent dome. Cerro Tortoral has produced an ignimbrite. Dark coloured lava flows are found to the southwest of the caldera. The total volume of the Guacha system is about 3,400 cubic kilometres (820 cu mi).

Several lakes are found in the caldera,> including the 16 square kilometres (6.2 sq mi) Laguna Busch (also known as Laguna Kalina). It is an elongated, shallow salt lake on the eastern floor of the caldera at 4,530–4,550 metres (14,860–14,930 ft) elevation. The lake is fed by springs and streams. During the late 20th century, ice bodies were observed on its shores and formed islands in the lake. Its waters are rich in boron and lithium. Other waterbodies in the caldera are Laguna Pelada in the southeastern corner, and (less certainly) Laguna Totoral and Catalcito northeast of Laguna Busch. Some geothermal activity occurs within the caldera and the El Tatio and Sol de Mañana geothermal fields lie on the margin of the Guacha and Pastos Grandes calderas. Laudrum et al. suggested that the heat from Guacha and Pastos Grandes may be transferred to the El Tatio geothermal system to the west.

== Geology ==
Off the western coast of South America, the Nazca Plate and the Antarctic Plate subduct beneath the continent. This subduction process is responsible for volcanism in the Andean Volcanic Belt, which is subdivided into four sectors: The Northern Volcanic Zone, the Central Volcanic Zone (CVZ), the Southern Volcanic Zone and the Austral Volcanic Zone by sectors without volcanic activity. Subduction has been ongoing since the Jurassic, but the breakup of the Farallon Plate during the Oligocene prompted an increase of volcanic activity and the set-up of the present-day geologic and tectonic regimen. The CVZ, which Cerro Guacha is a member of, includes about 44 active volcanoes and numerous Quaternary silicic volcanic systems, including the Altiplano-Puna volcanic complex (APVC) in the back-arc region of the CVZ. Changes in the subduction geometry caused variations in volcanic activity over the past few million years, and a southward migration of ignimbrite volcanism has been linked to the subduction of the Juan Fernandez Ridge.

The geologic basement at Cerro Guacha is formed by Paleogene red beds and Ordovician sediments overlying the Arequipa-Antofalla terrane of Paleoproterozoic-Paleozoic age. During the Paleozoic the region was a marine basin; mountain formation began during the Mesozoic and the Altiplano had become a high plateau by about 13-11 million years ago, second only to Tibet in size. The prolonged arid climate has preserved volcanic and tectonic landforms in the Altiplano, which thus dominate the regional landscape.

=== Local ===
Guacha caldera is part of the APVC, an igneous province in the central Andes. It covers a surface area of 70,000 square kilometres (27,000 sq mi) at an average altitude of 4,000 metres (13,000 ft) between the Altiplano and the Atacama. Several large caldera complexes are found within this area, including Cerro Panizos, Coranzuli, La Pacana, Pastos Grandes, Purico complex and Vilama, which include some of the largest calderas on Earth. They formed from the failure of the roofs of magma chambers, yielding highly productive vents that yielded mainly dense pyroclastic flows and lacked Plinian fall-out stages. The APVC eruptions are among the largest explosive eruptions on Earth. Volcanic activity took place in several pulses, 8, 6 and 4 million years ago with a westward trend; during this time period between 10-1 million years ago roughly 10,000 cubic kilometres (2,400 cu mi) of ignimbrites were erupted from the APVC volcanoes. Volcanic activity has waned during the past 4 million years in the APVC and activity transitioned from a "flare-up" mode to a steady state one, where volcanic cones grew up in the region. Present day activity is limited to geothermal phenomena in El Tatio, Sol de Manana and Guacha, and the recent extrusion of Quaternary lava domes and flows which imply the APVC is still active. Deformation in the area occurs beneath Uturuncu volcano north of the Guacha centre and has drawn attention to the APVC.

A large structure, the 500,000 cubic kilometres (120,000 cu mi) Altiplano-Puna Magma Body (APMB), underlies the APVC at 10–20 kilometres (6.2–12.4 mi) depth and is centered underneath Cerro Guacha. It is a mush consisting of less than 50% molten rock and is one of the largest such structures on Earth. The magmas erupted by the APVC volcanoes are generated there, later ascending to intermediary magma chambers at shallower depths before eruption. Solidification of magma above the APMB may have left a number of plutons.

The Guacha caldera forms a structure with the neighbouring Cerro Panizos, Coranzulí and Vilama calderas associated with a fault named the Lípez lineament. Activity along this lineament commenced with the Abra Granada volcanic complex 10 million years ago and dramatically increased more than a million years later. Volcanic activity is linked to this fault zone and to the thermal maturation of the underlying crust, and was highly synchronous between these calderas. Guacha caldera is also closely linked to the neighbouring La Pacana caldera, with faults linking the two, and the Atana ignimbrite from La Pacana crops out in the Cerro Guacha caldera.

=== Composition and magma properties ===
Cerro Guacha has erupted rocks ranging from dacite to rhyolite, with the Guacha Ignimbrite consisting of dacitic to rhyodacitic and the Tara by dacitic to rhyolitic rocks. APVC volcanic rocks, including these of Cerro Guacha, define a potassium-rich calc-alkaline suite. The Guacha Ignimbrite is crystal-rich, while the Tara Ignimbrite is less crystalline. Mineras in the rocks include amphibole, augite, biotite, hornblende, plagioclase, quartz and sanidine. The magma contained about 6% water by weight and had temperatures of 750–850 °C (1,380–1,560 °F).

Calculations indicate that the Guacha system was supplied by magmas at a rate of 0.007–0.018 cubic kilometres per year (5.3×10^{−5}–0.000137 cu mi/Ms). The magmas formed through assimilation of surrounding rock, mixing, recharge and crystal fractionation processes. In the case of the Tara Ignimbrite, they took place at two distinct depths: Andesite between 25–10 kilometres (15.5–6.2 mi) and dacite at 9–5 kilometres (5.6–3.1 mi) depth. The formation process took tens to hundreds of thousands of years, with each eruption originating from a distinct magma batch. Variations in volatile content could be responsible for differences in eruption styles.

== Climate and life ==
The climate of the Central Andes is cold and dry, with annual precipitation ranging between 50 millimetres (2.0 in) and 200 millimetres (7.9 in) and mean temperatures only barely exceeding 0 °C (32 °F). This arid climate may go back to the Mesozoic and may be due to the eastern mountain chain of the Andes preventing Amazon moisture from reaching the Altiplano area. Oxygen isotope analysis indicates that the Guacha caldera ignimbrites have had little influence from meteoric waters. This is consistent with the climate of the Guacha region displaying long-term aridity for the last 10 million years as well as with the scarcity of pronounced geothermal systems in the APVC which are essentially limited to the El Tatio and Sol de Manana fields. However, during the late Pleistocene lakes in the region were much larger than present.

The landscape is barren, the sparse vegetation consists of bushes, grasses and small Polylepis incana trees. Laguna Busch is an important habitat and nesting site for flamingos, and one of several lakes in Bolivia with more than a thousand birds recorded. In 1997 almost 10,000 flamingos were recorded, mostly James' flamingo. Baird's sandpiper, a migratory bird, has been reported from Laguna Busch. The Ojo de Novillito archaeological site is close to Laguna Busch. Presently, the area of the caldera is within the Eduardo Avaroa Andean Fauna National Reserve.

== Eruptive history ==
Volcanic activity at Cerro Guacha commenced about 8.5-6 million years ago; an 7.6 ± 0.3 million years old ignimbrite around Cerro Zapaleri and the 6.6 million years old Kalina and Chajnantor Tuffs (northwest and east of Cerro Guacha, respectively) constitute the oldest volcanic activity associated with the volcano. After initiation of volcanic activity, eruptions occurred at regular intervals and included events with dense rock equivalents exceeding 450 cubic kilometres (110 cu mi). These eruptions have a Volcanic explosivity index of 8, making Cerro Guacha a supervolcano and the source of Bolivia's largest volcanic eruptions. The typical Guacha ignimbrites contain varying quantities of lithics, tubular or flattened pumice and volcanic ash, the latter usually increasing towards the top of the deposit. The close succession of multiple large scale eruptions indicates that plutons feeding such eruptions are assembled over millions of years. Some ash deposits in northwestern Argentina and in the northern Chilean Coast Range may be linked to Cerro Guacha. After the large eruptions, remnant magma was extruded in the form of lava flows and uplift of the caldera floor, accompanied perhaps by Pelean eruptions, took place.

The Guacha ignimbrite (Note: The Guacha ignimbrite includes the Lower Tara Ignimbrite, Chajnantor Tuff, Pampa Guayaques Tuff and possibly the Bonanza Ignimbrite. It was first considered part of the Atana Ignimbrite.) was erupted about 5.65±0.01 million years ago. The first Guacha caldera and the eastern scarp formed during this eruption; with a volume of 1,200 cubic kilometres (290 cu mi) it is among the largest known calderas. Subvertically banded Guacha ignimbrite layers rich in lithic clasts crop out in the western scarp, the ignimbrite is pumice-poor and crystal-rich. The Guacha Ignimbrite has a minimum volume of 1,300 cubic kilometres (310 cu mi). It covers a surface area of at least 5,800 square kilometres (2,200 sq mi) and extends over distances of up to 130 kilometres (81 mi), making this ignimbrite among the most widespread in the Andes. One stream spreads 60 kilometres (37 mi) northwards past Uturunku volcano along the Quetena valley. The Guacha Ignimbrite is frequently buried between deposits from more recent eruptions, and part of it invaded the La Pacana caldera. Remnant magmas from the eruption produced the Brajma lava dome on the eastern caldera rim. After the Guacha ignimbrite eruption, water filled the caldera. The long time gap between the Guacha Ignimbrite eruption and renewed activity led to significant sediment deposition in the caldera, forming the Campo Grande Formation.

The Tara ignimbrite (Note: Which includes the Upper Tara Ignimbrite, the Filo Delgado Ignimbrite and the Pampa Tortoral Tuff.) is 3.49±0.01 million years old; the eruption formed the western caldera scarp. It spread mostly north and southeast, between Argentina, Bolivia and Chile. It has a minimum volume of 800 cubic kilometres (190 cu mi) and covers a surface area of at least 1,800 square kilometres (690 sq mi) in Chile and 2,300 square kilometres (890 sq mi) in Bolivia (where it was at first not recognized). The ignimbrite forms one largely homogeneous deposit within the caldera where it ponded, while four separate flow units (with variable degrees of induration) separated by coignimbrite fallout have been identified outside of it. One particularly thick layer (>200 metres (660 ft)) is found beneath Zapaleri stratovolcano. Geological considerations indicate that this ignimbrite formed from pre-existent melts and an influx of andesitic magma. The main caldera-forming eruption was preceded by a Plinian eruption} that produced a <10 cubic kilometres (2.4 cu mi) fallout deposit mostly southeast of the caldera; such a Plinian stage is unique for APVC eruptions. The Tara ignimbrite caldera has dimensions of 30 by 20 kilometres (19 mi × 12 mi). After the eruption, lava domes (Chajnantor, 3.67±0.13 mya old Rio Guacha and 3.61±0.02 mya old Chajnantor Lava) grew on the northern caldera floor when leftover magmas ascended to the surface. Like the Guacha Ignimbrite eruption, the Tara Ignimbrite eruption was followed by flooding of the caldera and a long phase of inactivity. Wind eroded yardangs (aerodynamic ridges) into some outcrops of Tara ignimbrite.

A third caldera cycle about 2 million years ago gave rise to the Puripica Chico ignimbrite and some andesite lavas. This 10 cubic kilometres (2.4 cu mi) ignimbrite was erupted 1.72±0.01 million years ago, presumably at the hinge of the Guacha caldera under the Puripica Chico lavas at the Amargo lava dome. Its emplacement was not accompanied by caldera formation, although a trapdoor-like collapse is possible. The youngest dates obtained on Guacha rocks come from the Negreal de Totoral lava flows: 1.54 ± 0.04 million years old.

The 4.2 million years old Puripicar ignimbrite with a volume of 1,500 cubic kilometres (360 cu mi) was originally attributed to Guacha, but is now linked to Chaxas. Another ignimbrite associated with Guacha is the Guataquina Ignimbrite named after Paso de Guataquina. It covers an area of 2,300 square kilometres (890 sq mi) and has an approximate volume of 70 cubic kilometres (17 cu mi). It was later interpreted to be a combination of the Guacha, Tara and non-Guacha Atana ignimbrites.

== See also ==
- Altiplano-Puna volcanic complex
- Cerro Bitiche
- Galán
- La Pacana
- Pastos Grandes
