= Rincon volcanic complex =

Volcano in Argentina

Coordinates: 24°05′S 67°20′W

Rincon volcanic complex is a volcano in Argentina.

This volcanic complex is formed by a southwest–northeast trending 30 kilometres (19 mi) long series of volcanoes that contain amphitheatres. The volcanoes are formed mainly by lava flows; pyroclastic material has only a subordinate role. The amphitheatre of the cone-shaped southwestern volcano is filled in by a lava dome, and lava domes also occur at the margins of the main complex.

The Rincon complex has erupted both andesite and dacite. The rocks have typical volcanic arc composition and contain clinopyroxene, orthopyroxene and plagioclase. The magma started off as calc-alkaline and was subsequently modified by the crust and by crystal fractionation processes. The origin of the magmas is ultimately the mantle wedge.

The volcano was active about 10 million years ago, and shifted from northeast to southwest through the history of the complex. The marginal lava domes form the last activity at Rincon.
