= TulTul, Del Medio and Pocitos =

Coordinates: 24°10′S 67°03′W

TulTul, Del Medio and Pocitos are three volcanoes in Argentina. Small Inka shrines have been found on their summits.

Since the Jurassic, subduction off the western margin of South America has generated volcanism, which after starting in the Cordillera de la Costa now occurs in the Andes. Since the Oligocene, the Puna has been volcanically active as well. There, some stratovolcanoes including TulTul, Del Medio and Pocitos are aligned on the Calama-Olacapato-El Toro fault which cuts across the plateau in southeast direction and forms a 10–20 kilometres (6.2–12.4 mi) wide belt.

TulTul is 5,276 metres (17,310 ft) high, making it the highest volcano of the three. Del Medio reaches 4,842 metres (15,886 ft) and Pocitos 5,036 metres (16,522 ft); all three volcanoes rise about a kilometre or more above the surrounding terrain. They are constructed by andesite and dacite and form a 35 kilometres (22 mi) long alignment. Del Medio and Pocitos both feature traces of their southern flank collapsing, and both have a summit caldera 3.5 kilometres (2.2 mi) and 3 kilometres (1.9 mi) wide respectively. Tul Tul had a central vent which formed andesitic lava flows and later, above these lava flows, dacitic domes. Like Pocitos, it has no trace of a crater. The cones feature lava flows emanating from their summits and alluvial fans at their feet.

Volcanism in the Central Andes is caused by the subduction of the Nazca Plate under the South American Plate. The volcanoes were active 8 to 6 million years ago, during the Miocene. Lava domes were emplaced on all three volcanoes late in their history. The magmas that constructed these volcanoes appear to have originated in the lower crust from a garnet-bearing precursor. Moraines developed at elevations exceeding 3,900 metres (12,800 ft) elevation on Del Medio and Pocitos, consisting of c. 2 metres (6 ft 7 in) features on the walls of a cirque and two lateral moraines downvalley. These moraines formed before the Last Glacial Maximum, but during wet periods in the Salar de Uyuni.
