= Cerro Morado =

Monogenetic volcanic field in Argentina

Coordinates: 22°51′S 66°43′W

Cerro Morado is a monogenetic volcanic field, in Argentina. It is part of a group of mafic volcanic centres in the Altiplano-Puna region, which is dominated by silicic rocks such as dacitic - rhyolitic rocks.

The field was formed during eruptions 6.4 million years ago which probably lasted from half a year to several years. These eruptions formed scoria cones and a plateau of lava flows.

== Geology and geography ==
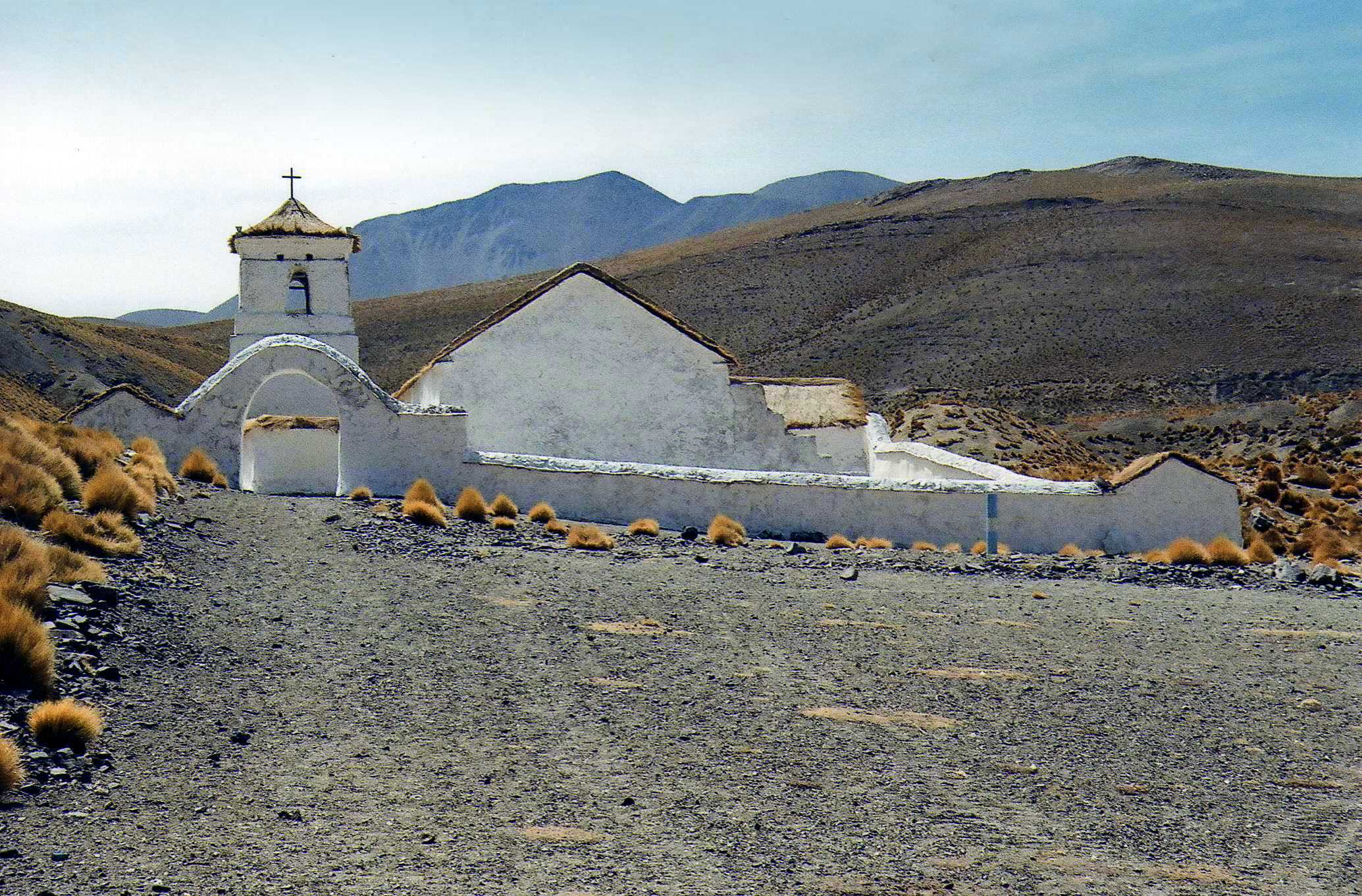
Chapel of Rosario de Coyaguayma, Jujuy, Argentina

The Cerro Morado volcanic field is located in northwestern Argentina, in the Jujuy Province. The town of Rosario de Coyaguayma is located within the volcanic field. The frontier with Chile lies approximately 30 kilometres (19 mi) west of the volcanic field.

The Altiplano and the adjacent southern Puna has experienced mafic volcanism during the Cenozoic. Most of this volcanism occurred in the southern segment, but the northern segment has also experienced mafic volcanism mostly associated with major volcanic centres and smaller volcanic fields such as Cerro Morado and Cerro Bitiche. Mafic lava flows however tend to constitute the minority of volcanic rocks in this region; the bulk of the volcanic rocks are dacitic-rhyolitic in composition. Present day volcanism occurs in the volcanic arc called the Central Volcanic Zone approximately 70 kilometres (43 mi) farther west. The basement in the Cerro Morado area is formed by Ordovician rock formations and older lava flows of the Pairique volcanic complex and the Patahuasi flows. Volcanism in the area has been influenced by faults.

The field covers a surface area of 19 by 6 kilometres (11.8 mi × 3.7 mi), alternatively stated as 100 kilometres (62 mi). Eight scoria cones form the volcanic field, but there may be more. With exceptions erosion has buried their bases. Layered deposits containing ash, lava bombs and lapilli are found around them. These cones are frequently aligned and an average diameter of 0.7 kilometres (0.43 mi) and the heights range 15–65 metres (49–213 ft). Other structures associated with the cones are clastogenic lava flows and eroded pyroclastic mounds, as well as dykes that cut the cones.

The volcanic field is dominated by a plateau made of lobate lava flows, typically having thicknesses of 5–18 metres (16–59 ft). The lava flows contain folding and flow structures. Various layers of lava flows lie on top of each other and on the basement, and pyroclastic deposits can also be found. The volcanic field has a north-south extension.

The volcano has erupted andesite and basaltic andesite. Most cones are constructed from basaltic andesite, most lava flow lithofacies are andesitic. The andesites have a dark-blue to gray colour, with variable amounts of vesicles. Minerals found in the rocks include bytownite, clinopyroxene, iron-titanium oxides, labradorite, orthopyroxene and plagioclase. Olivine is more common in the basaltic andesite than the andesite. Overall, the composition is potassium-rich calc-alkaline. Xenoliths of quartz are contained in the andesite. Some of the rocks that form the cones are hydrothermally altered.

The volcanic field was formed during the Upper Miocene. Dates of 6.7 ± 0.4 million years ago have been obtained. The field was formed by energetic effusive eruptions; lava supply rates of up to 20 cubic metres per second (710 cu ft/s) and an emplacement time of 84-18 months for the northern and 48-7 months for the southern parts of the field have been estimated. The field was probably formed by Strombolian eruptions accompanied by lava fountaining. Magma was transported along fractures and faults, resulting in the eruption of several different batches of magma without long stalling in the upper crust.

== See also ==
- List of volcanic fields

== Sources ==
- Caffe, Pablo J.; Maro, Guadalupe; Presta, Juan F.; Flores, Patrocinio I.; Peralta, Yesica (February 2012). "Neogene monogenetic volcanoes from the northern Puna of Argentina, Central Andean plateau". ResearchGate. Auckland: Fourth International Maar Conference. p. 19.
- Cabrera, A.P.; Caffe, P.J. (August 2009). "The Cerro Morado Andesites: Volcanic history and eruptive styles of a mafic volcanic field from northern Puna, Argentina". Journal of South American Earth Sciences. 28 (2): 113–131. doi:10.1016/j.jsames.2009.03.007.
