= Abra Granada =

Volcanic complex in Puna de Atacama, Argentina

Coordinates: 22°32′S 66°32′W

- Country: Argentina
- Region: Puna de Atacama
- Age: 9.8-7.8 Ma
- Last eruption: 7.9-5.0 mya

Abra Granada is a volcanic complex in the Puna de Atacama in Argentina. It is located approximately 45 kilometres (28 mi) north of Pirquitas and is composed from a lava dome, lavas and dacitic ignimbrites centering on Cerro Granada (5,700 metres (18,700 ft)) and are dated 9.8-7.8 Ma. Deposits erupted 7.9-5.0 mya by this volcano overlie the older Granada ignimbrite. Individual volcanic centres are known as Cerro Caucani, Cerro Granada and Cerro Solterío. The Pirquitas mine is part of the volcanic complex.

Other peraluminous rocks were erupted 10 mya. The complex is the likely source of the Granada Ignimbrite. The ignimbrite reaches its maximum thickness in the complex.
