= Paso de Jama =

Mountain pass through the Andes between Chile and Argentina

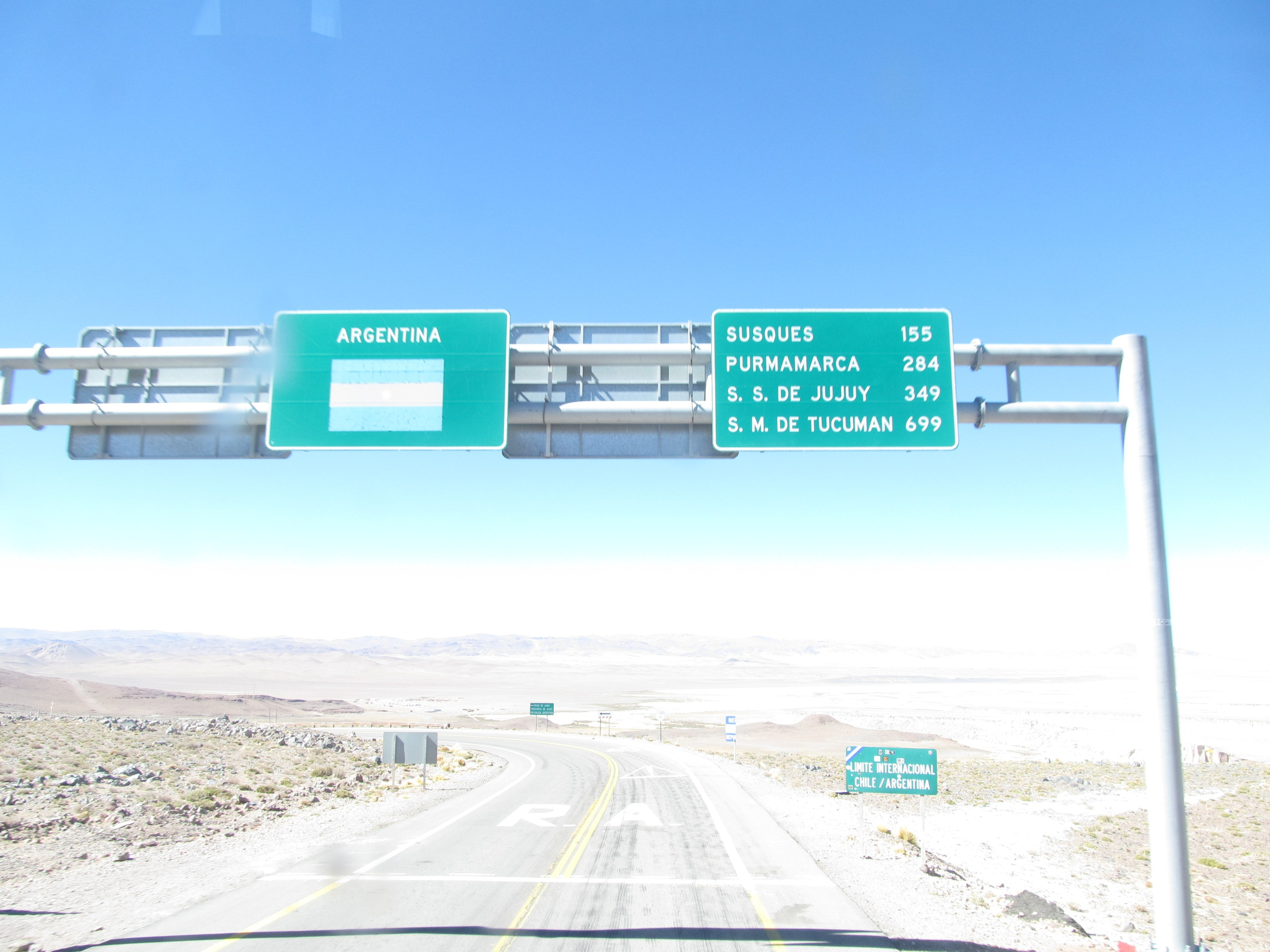

- Location within Argentina
- Elevation: 4,200 metres (13,800 ft)

Third Approach
- Location: Argentina–Chile border
- Range: Andes
- Coordinates: 23°14′15″S 67°04′35″W

The Paso de Jama is a mountain pass through the Andes between Chile and Argentina, at an elevation of 4,200 m (13,800 ft) at the border. It is the northernmost road border crossing between the two countries. The pass is reached via Chile Route 27 and via National Route 52 (Argentina). The Chile Route 27 reaches an altitude according to OpenStreetMap of 4,831 metres (15,850 ft) at 23°04′21″S 67°30′17″W in a road distance of 57.6 kilometres (35.8 mi) west of the border, making it one of the highest highways in South America.

The pass links the city of Jujuy in Argentina with San Pedro de Atacama in Chile. The road was opened on 6 December 1991, and has been paved throughout 2005. It is open throughout the year, although occasionally closed by snow. It is used by truck traffic between northern Argentina and Paraguay and the ports of northern Chile.

The Argentine border station is five kilometers east of the border in the small settlement of Jama at 4,100 metres (13,500 ft), 23°14′14″S 67°01′22″W As of at least 2016 this site offers joint entry/exit processing by Chilean and Argentine authorities for customs, immigration, and other checks.

There is an additional Chilean border station at San Pedro de Atacama, 160 km from the pass.
