= Zapaleri =

Mountain in South America

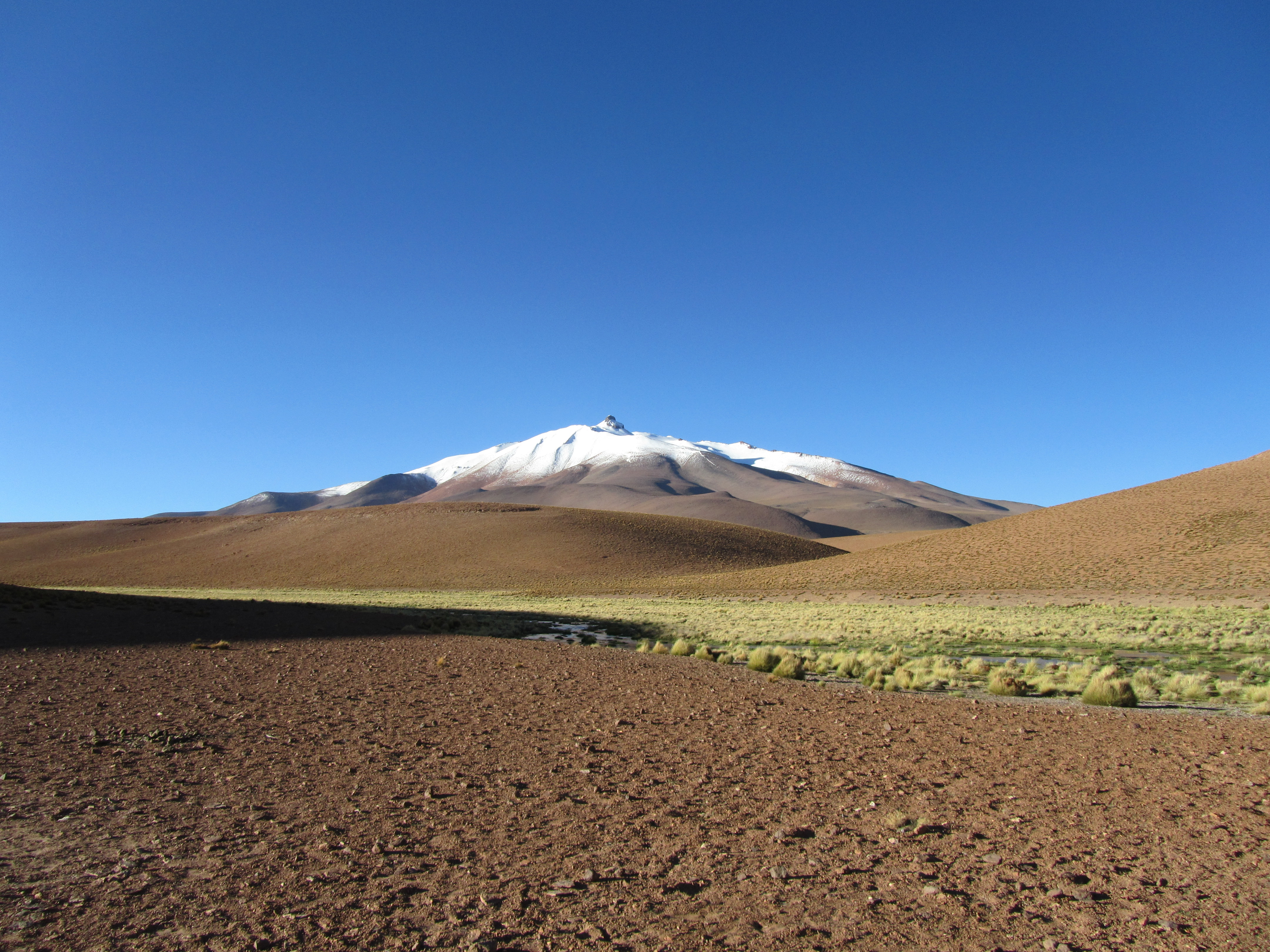

Highest point
- Elevation: 5,643 m (18,514 ft)
- Listing: Volcanoes of Argentina; Volcanoes of Bolivia; Volcanoes of Chile
- Coordinates: 22°48′57″S 67°10′48″W

Geography
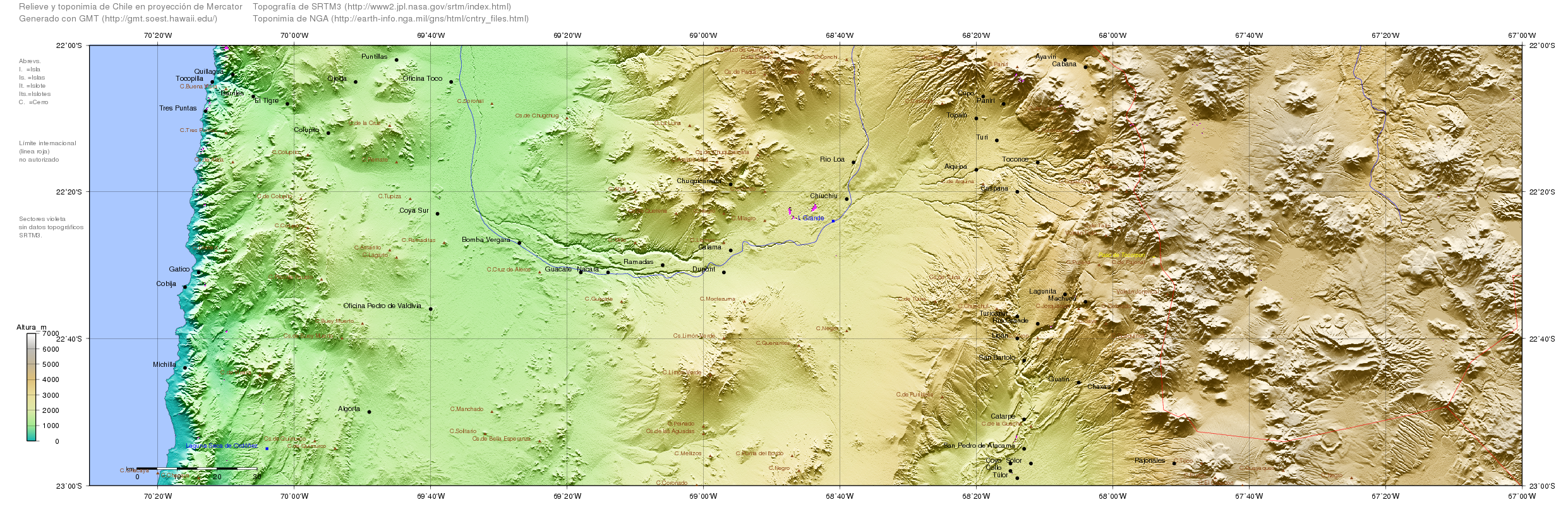
- Zapaleri, right down on the map
- Countries: Argentina, Bolivia and Chile
- Parent range: Andes

Zapaleri is a volcano whose summit is the tripoint of the borders of Argentina, Bolivia and Chile. A number of railways are in the area. The volcano formed on top of the 2.89 mya Tara Ignimbrite from the Guacha caldera and the basement beneath the volcano is formed from Cretaceous and Tertiary rocks affected by tectonic deformation. Volcanic rocks are andesite, basalt, dacite and rhyolite. Late Cretaceous rocks are also found in the area, as are Pleistocene shoshonite volcanic rocks.

The Bolivian portion of the mountain is protected within Eduardo Avaroa Andean Fauna National Reserve. Moreover, it is close to the sector Salar de Tara-Salar de Aguas Calientes of Los Flamencos National Reserve, Chile.

Zapaleri is associated with a major source of obsidian, with a distribution sphere found in archeological sites over 350 kilometres (220 mi) wide. The obsidian is found on the Bolivian side of the border next to Laguna Blanca. Another source is found on Solterio Mountain. Inca and earlier archeological remains are associated with the obsidian sites.
