= Calc-alkaline magma series =

Subdivision of the subalkaline magma series

TAS diagram showing chemical composition range of sub-alkaline volcanic rocks including calc-alkaline rocks (yellow area) and alkaline volcanic rocks (blue area)

The calc-alkaline magma series is one of two main subdivisions of the subalkaline magma series, the other subalkaline magma series being the tholeiitic series. A magma series is a series of compositions that describes the evolution of a mafic magma, which is high in magnesium and iron and produces basalt or gabbro, as it fractionally crystallizes to become a felsic magma, which is low in magnesium and iron and produces rhyolite or granite. Calc-alkaline rocks are rich in alkaline earths (magnesia and calcium oxide) and alkali metals and make up a major part of the crust of the continents.

The diverse rock types in the calc-alkaline series include volcanic types such as basalt, andesite, dacite, rhyolite, and also their coarser-grained intrusive equivalents (gabbro, diorite, granodiorite, and granite). They do not include silica-undersaturated, alkalic, or peralkaline rocks.

== Geochemical characterization ==
AFM diagram showing the relative proportions of the oxides of alkalis (A), iron (F), and magnesium (M), with arrows showing the compositional change path of the magmas in the tholeiitic and the calc-alkaline magma series (BT=tholeiitic basalt, FB=ferro-basalt, ABT=tholeiitic basaltic andesite, AT=tholeiitic andesite, D=dacite, R=rhyolite, B=basalt, AB=basaltic andesite, A=andesite; dashed line=boundary between tholeiitic and calc-alkaline compositions)

Rocks from the calc-alkaline magma series are distinguished from rocks from the tholeiitic magma series by the redox state of the magma they crystallized from. Tholeiitic magmas are reduced, and calc-alkaline magmas are oxidized, with higher oxygen fugacities. When mafic (basalt-producing) magmas crystallize, they preferentially crystallize the more magnesium-rich and iron-poor forms of the silicate minerals olivine and pyroxene, causing the iron content of tholeiitic magmas to increase as the melt is depleted of iron-poor crystals. (Magnesium-rich olivine solidifies at much higher temperatures than iron-rich olivine.) However, a calc-alkaline magma is oxidized enough to (simultaneously) precipitate significant amounts of the iron oxide magnetite, causing the iron content of the magma to remain more steady as it cools than with a tholeiitic magma.

The difference between these two magma series can be seen on an AFM diagram, a ternary diagram showing the relative proportions of the oxides of Na_{2}O + K_{2}O (A), FeO + Fe_{2}O_{3} (F), and MgO (M). As magmas cool, they precipitate out significantly more iron and magnesium than alkali, causing the magmas to move towards the alkali corner. In tholeiitic magma, as it cools and preferentially produces magnesium-rich crystals, the magnesium content of the magma plummets, causing the magma to move away from the magnesium corner until it runs low on magnesium and begins to move towards the alkali corner as it loses iron and remaining magnesium. With the calc-alkaline series, however, the precipitation of magnetite causes the iron-magnesium ratio to remain relatively constant, so the magma moves in a straight line towards the alkali corner on the AFM diagram.

Calc-alkaline magmas are typically hydrous.

== Geologic context ==
Calc-alkaline rocks typically are found in the volcanic arcs above subduction zones, commonly in island arcs and particularly in continental arcs.

== Petrologic origin ==
Rocks in the series are thought to be genetically related by fractional crystallization and to be at least partly derived from magmas of basalt composition formed in the Earth's mantle. Trends in composition can be explained by a variety of processes. Many explanations focus on water content and oxidation states of the magmas.

Proposed mechanisms of formation begin with partial melting of subducted material and of mantle peridotite (olivine and pyroxene) altered by water and melts derived from subducted material. Mechanisms by which the calc-alkaline magmas then evolve may include fractional crystallization, assimilation of continental crust, and mixing with partial melts of continental crust.

== See also ==
- Alkali basalt
- Alkaline magma series
- Igneous differentiation
