= Tocorpuri =

Volcano in Bolivia and Chile

- Tocopuri
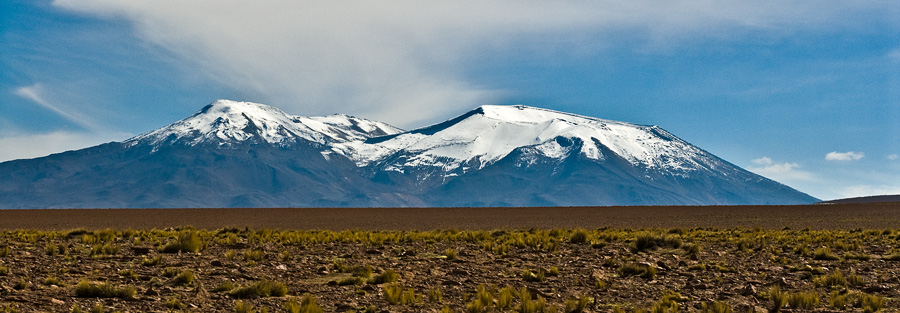
- View from the south-west.

Highest point
- Elevation: 5,808 m (19,055 ft)
- Listing: Volcanoes of Bolivia; Volcanoes of Chile
- Coordinates: 22°26′S 67°58′W

Dimensions
- Area: 11 km^{2} (4.2 mi^{2})

Geography
- Location within Chile Location within Bolivia
- Countries: Chile and Bolivia

Geology
- Rock age: Pleistocene
- Volcanic zone: Altiplano-Puna volcanic complex
- Last eruption: 34,000 ± 7,000 years

Tocorpuri is a volcano on the border between Chile and Bolivia. Its peak height is most recently given as 5,808 metres (19,055 ft) and it features a 1.3 kilometres (0.81 mi) wide summit crater. The volcano consists mainly of lava flows and pyroclastic deposits and is subdivided into two separate edifices. Just west of Tocorpuri, the La Torta lava dome is a 200 m (660 ft) high flat-topped structure. The volcanoes are formed by andesitic, dacitic and rhyolitic rocks.

The Tocorpuri volcanoes developed in the late Pleistocene in three separate stages and were subject to glaciation and tectonic faulting. The most recent eruption generated the La Torta lava dome 34,000 ± 7,000 years ago; presently there is geothermal activity which may be connected to that of the neighbouring El Tatio geothermal field.

== Geomorphology ==
Tocorpuri lies in northern Chile, about 100 kilometres (62 mi) east of Calama. The border with Bolivia runs around the eastern side of Tocorpuri's summit crater. The area lies in Chile's Antofagasta Department and on Bolivia's Potosí Department and a pre-Hispanic road connecting the Bolivian Altiplano with the San Pedro de Atacama region passes south of the volcano. This road system is considered to be the oldest in Chile, was in use since the Formative Period. The name comes from the Kunza language, is also known as Michina, Cerro de Tocorpuri Cerros de Tocorpuri or Volcán Tocorpuri.

Tocorpuri volcano is a complex of three different edifices. East Tocorpuri is 5,808 metres (19,055 ft) high (Note: Heights of 5,018 metres (16,463 ft), 5,830 metres (19,130 ft) or of over 6,000 metres (20,000 ft) have been reported for Tocorpuri; the Chilean geographer Luis Risopatrón believed it was 6,755 metres (22,162 ft) high and thus the fourth-highest peak in the Americas.) and rises 1 kilometre (0.62 mi) around the surrounding terrain. A large, slightly elongated 1.3 kilometres (0.81 mi) wide summit crater caps the summit. From Tocorpuri's summit, the Salar de Atacama salt flat and the Chuquicamata mine, the largest copper mine in the world, are visible. Sulfur deposits can be found in the summit region and were mined in the past. Other craters are heavily eroded and old, eroded lava flows occur on the southern flank, with younger, smaller flows present in the summit region. West (Note: West Tocorpuri is located north of East Tocorpuri.) Tocorpuri consists mainly of blocky lava flows which are particularly noticeable on the western side while East Tocorpuri consists of lava flows, pyroclastic deposits and tuff-like breccia. There is evidence of a southeastward sector collapse of Tocorpuri, which crops out on an area of 9 square kilometres (3.5 sq mi) on the southeastern flank within a horseshoe-shaped scar. Tocorpuri is part of the main volcanic chain of the border region between Chile and Bolivia.

The La Torta ("cake" in Spanish (Note: Low lava domes in the Central Andes are frequently referred to as "tortas".)) lava dome is located between the Tocorpuri volcano to the east and Tatio volcano to the west. It is a flat-topped, about 200 metres (660 ft) high body with steep flanks that covers a surface of about 11 square kilometres (4.2 sq mi) in a flat area. Its flanks are covered with scree, while its top features flow folds and wrinkles. The dome reaches an elevation of 5,018 metres (16,463 ft). Two separate vents and two different geologic units are discernible. It and Tocorpuri, which are 10 kilometres (6.2 mi) distant from each other, have been described as a volcano pair, whose existence may be a consequence of tectonics.

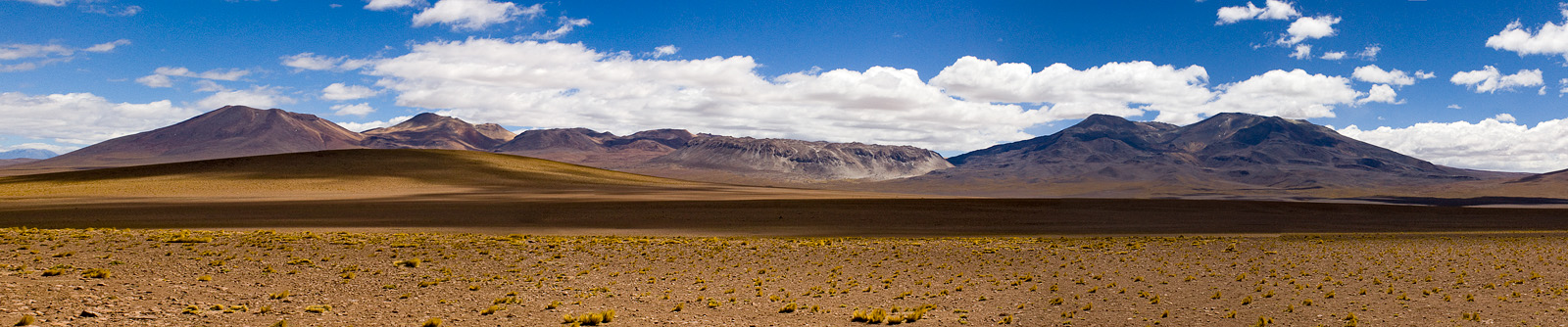
FLTR: Tatio Volcano, Cerros de Tatio, Cerro La Torta, Cerros de Tocorpuri. Camera location: 22°33′12″S 67°51′14″W

Glacial erosion has cut into the flanks of the volcanoes, with moraines and mudflow deposits covering the foot of La Torta and cirques and glacial striations occurring on the Tocorpuri volcanoes. In the past, a glacier filled the crater of Tocorpuri. South of La Torta, moraines extending from East Tocorpuri extend south-southwestward. Between Tatio and La Torta, there are two tongues of moraines side-by-side. The moraines from the western valley have overrun the eastern valley moraines and are accompanied by thin drift deposits. These moraines have been dated by surface exposure dating: They formed during the regional Last Glacial Maximum and by about 30,700 years ago the western glaciers were gone. Erosional debris covers the flanks of Tocorpuri.

== Climate and hydrology ==
The region has a high-altitude steppe climate with a low mean temperature of 2 °C (36 °F) and a diurnal temperature range of 20 °C (36 °F). Annual precipitation on the summit has been estimated to exceed 360 millimetres (14 in), while about 159 millimetres (6.3 in) fall every year south of Tocorpuri. Most of it occurs during summer as convective precipitation. Snow has been observed on the summit, and a 1985 map displays a persistent ice/snow cover there. The Putana River south of Tocorpuri flows towards the Salar de Atacama and receives important tributaries from the Tocorpuri area, such as Quebrada La Torta, Rio Blanco o Tocorpuri and Quebrada Agua Brava.

== Geology ==
Off the western coast of South America, the Nazca Plate subducts beneath the South America Plate in the Peru-Chile Trench. This subduction process is responsible for volcanism in most of the Andean Volcanic Belt, which consists of the Northern Volcanic Zone (NVZ), the Central Volcanic Zone (CVZ), the South Volcanic Zone (SVZ) and the Austral Volcanic Zone (AVZ). Tocorpuri is part of the CVZ.

The Altiplano-Puna volcanic complex (APVC) has been episodically active between 10 and 1 million years ago. Surges in activity took place 8, 6 and 4 million years ago; since 2.6 million years ago activity has declined. In the late Pleistocene, the lava domes Cerro Chanka, Cerro Chao, Cerro Chascon-Runtu Jarita complex, Chillahuita and Tocorpuri were emplaced around 100,000–90,000 years ago. The total volume of these domes exceeds 40 cubic kilometres (9.6 cu mi), of which Cerro Chao is by far the largest. These domes are part of a northwest–southeast alignment that is associated with the margin of the Pastos Grandes caldera. Volcanism today is focused on the arc and is mainly andesitic, having built numerous volcanic cones. The formation of a batholith under the APVC may be ongoing.

Most of the region is covered by Tertiary ignimbrites, except for the area at the frontier between Bolivia and Chile which features Quaternary volcanics; the pre-ignimbrite basement crops out only farther west. These ignimbrites were produced by eruptions in the APVC. Geologic lineaments have influenced the development of the volcanoes, including that of Tocorpuri, and La Torta formed at the end of a thrust fault that may have served as the path of ascent of magma.

=== Composition ===
The volcanic rocks of Tocorpuri consist of andesite, dacite (Note: Dacite on West Tocorpuri and andesite on east Tocorpuri.) and rhyolite and define a potassium-rich calc-alkaline suite. Phenocrysts include biotite, clinopyroxene, hornblende, orthopyroxene and plagioclase and differ between the various rocks. An origin through fractional crystallization has been proposed. The volcanic rocks in the summit region are hydrothermally altered. The crystal-rich dacitic to rhyolitic composition of La Torta resembles that of the other APVC lava domes.

=== Hydrothermal system ===
Tocorpuri is reported to be solfatarically active, and there are hot springs, gas seeps and bubbling pools at 5,000 metres (16,000 ft) elevation north of La Torta. The El Tatio and Sol de Manana geothermal fields lie north and east of Tocorpuri, respectively, and Trujillo-Ramírez 1974 reported additional manifestations south of Tocorpuri. El Tatio may receive its heat flux from a heat reservoir under La Torta. Geotérmica del Norte, a consortium between the companies ENEL and the Empresa Nacional del Petróleo, holds concessions for geothermal power prospecting in the El Tatio-La Torta area.

== Geologic history ==
Volcanism in the area commenced 800,000 years ago. Tocorpuri formed in four stages, the first two built the two Tocorpuri volcanoes, the third produced lava flows emanating from fissure vents on Tocorpuri's southern and northwestern flank, and the fourth the La Torta dome. Déruelle 1979 inferred that East Tocorpuri was more recent than La Torta or West Tocorpuri.

Between the two stages of volcanic activity, the edifices were tectonically deformed. Thrusts and normal faults have offset Pliocene to Quaternary deposits around and on Tocorpuri, including in the summit region and the summit crater.

=== La Torta ===
Ages of less than one million years ago and of 101,000 years ago have been reported. A Holocene age was inferred from the fact that on its southeastern flank, La Torta overlies late Pleistocene moraines. Argon-argon dating eventually yielded an age of 34,000 ± 7,000 years ago.

The La Torta lava dome was emplaced through an effusive eruption that commenced with weak explosive activity; it appears to have formed through a single event. It is not clear whether volcanism at La Torta and the other lava domes is a relic of the previous activity of the APVC or the beginning of a new magmatic cycle. La Torta has been mentioned as a possible vent of the c. 700,000 years old Tatio ignimbrite, whose actual vent is probably buried under the Tatio volcanoes.

== See also ==
- Putana Volcano
- Sairecabur
- Laguna Colorada
