= Apacheta-Aguilucho volcanic complex =

Pair of volcanoes and lava domes in Chile

Coordinates: 21°50′S 68°10′W

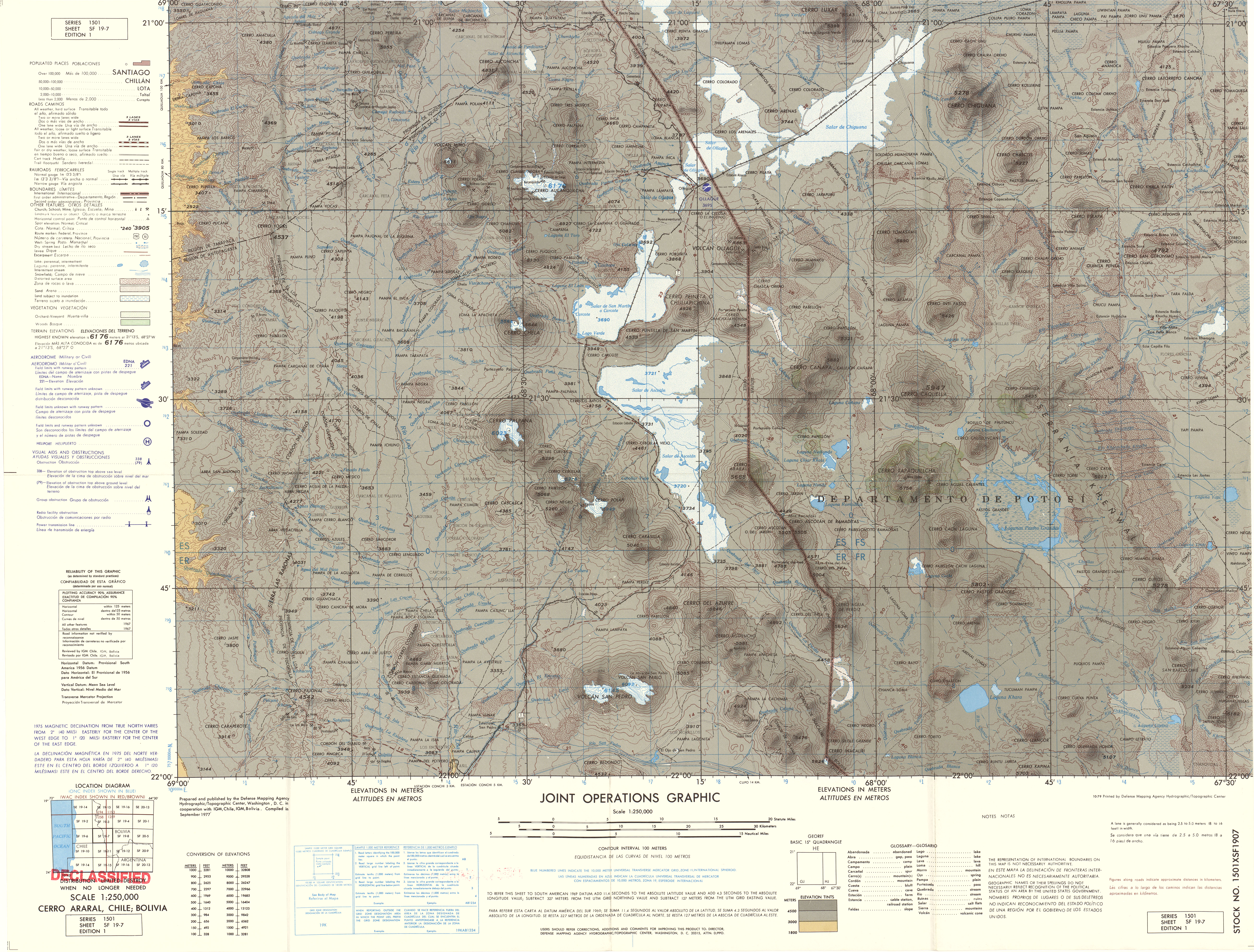

Highest point
- Elevation: 5,557 m (18,232 ft)

Geography
- Location within Chile

Apacheta-Aguilucho volcanic complex (also known as Cerro Pabellón) is a volcanic complex in Chile. It consists of two volcanoes Cerro Apacheta and Cerro Aguilucho, which are constructed mainly by lava flows and surrounded by outcrops of lava. A sector collapse and its landslide deposit are located on Apacheta's eastern flank. Two lava domes are associated with the volcanic complex, Chac-Inca and Pabellón.

The volcanic complex was active from the Miocene to the Pleistocene, but ongoing fumarolic activity has been observed and a geothermal system is present. A geothermal power plant was being built in 2015 and became active in late 2017, with another unit coming into service in 2022. It is the first geothermal power plant in Chile.

== Geography and geomorphology ==
The Apacheta-Aguilucho volcanic complex lies in northern Chile, close to the border with Bolivia. The city of Calama lies 105 kilometres (65 mi)-120 kilometres (75 mi) southwest of Apacheta-Aguilucho and El Tatio is about 60 kilometres (37 mi) south-southwest, but with the exception of geothermal power and mining-associated infrastructure the area is remote and uninhabited. Presently, the region has an arid climate. Vegetation, if present, consists mainly of grasses and shrubs.

The volcanic complex is part of the Central Volcanic Zone of the Andes. The Central Volcanic Zone further includes the Altiplano-Puna volcanic complex, which between 10 and 1 million years ago was the source of large ignimbrite eruptions that produced over 15,000 cubic kilometres (3,600 cu mi) of rock; after that it produced lava flows and lava domes like Cerro Chao and geothermal fields such as El Tatio and Sol de Mañana, accompanied by a decreased production of volcanic material. The Altiplano-Puna volcanic complex is underpinned by a magmatic body that appears to be a batholith, the Altiplano-Puna Magmatic Body. Volcanic activity is the consequence of the subduction of the Nazca Plate beneath the South America Plate. Aside from volcanic activity, crustal shortening has resulted in a thickened crust since about 35 million years ago.

=== The volcanic complex ===
Apacheta-Aguilucho is a volcanic complex formed by two volcanoes, Cerro Apacheta and Cerro Aguilucho, both composite volcanoes; with the highest summit of the complex reaching a height of 5,557 metres (18,232 ft). The northern Aguilucho volcano and the southern Apacheta volcano are in their central portions formed by rhyolitic lava flows, with the surrounding edifice formed by andesitic-dacitic lavas. An andesitic lahar and pyroclastic flow crops out south and east of Apacheta, which as the oldest part of the edifice is heavily eroded. North and east of the complex, the two lava domes Chac-Inca and Cerro Pabellón (also known as Apacheta or Pabellóncito) form the youngest part of the volcanic complex.

Moraines are encountered both west-southwest of Apacheta and east of the Chac-Inca dome, and traces of glacial erosion are observed on the Aguilucho crater region. The moraines developed during the Last Glacial Maximum.

=== Geothermal manifestations ===
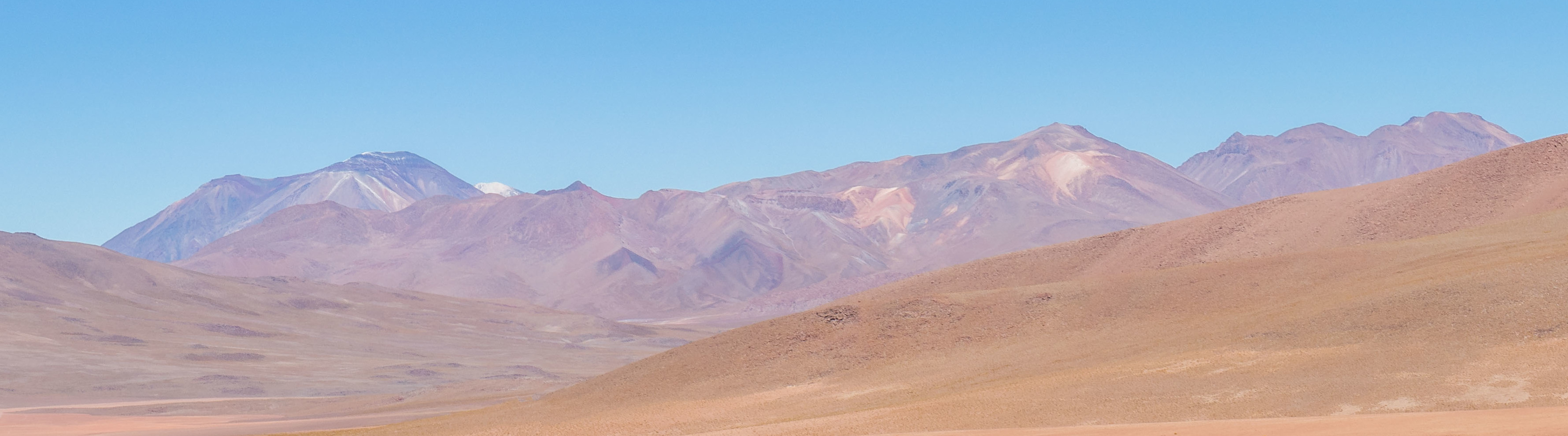
The volcanic complex as seen from Bolivia.

Apacheta volcano is fumarolically active on its northern and eastern slopes as well as on the summit. Two fumaroles on the summit of Apacheta produce 108–118 °C (226–244 °F) superheated steam at a high output; the gas has a composition typical of geothermal system fumaroles, with some differences. They are located within a wider c. 0.03 square kilometres (0.012 sq mi) area that features diffuse degassing, gryphons, mud pools and vents.

Apacheta-Aguilucho has a geothermal system and the chemistry of fumarole gases suggests that Apacheta-Aguilucho features an active magma system at depth. Drilling has found temperatures of over 200 °C (392 °F) at 500 metres (1,600 ft) depth. This fumarolic activity has resulted in hydrothermal alteration of many parts of the volcanic complex; this activity has generated a sulfur deposit on the west flank of Aguilucho. The mine Mina Aguilucho is located on Aguilucho's western flank.

The Pabellón geothermal system was discovered in 1999, extends over an area of 25 square kilometres (9.7 sq mi) and is classified as a "blind" geothermal system owing to its scarce activity at the surface. The only exceptions are the fumaroles of Aguilucho and a warm spring 17 kilometres (11 mi) from the power plant site; the ascent of gases to these fumaroles is presumably facilitated by the presence of intersecting faults. Thick clay layers encountered between about 165 metres (541 ft) and 490 metres (1,610 ft) depth in drill holes presumably seal the geothermal system and block ascent to the surface. The water remains in the system for a long time and undergoes prolonged interaction with the country rock. The source of heat is unclear; the last eruptions of Apacheta-Aguilucho are too long ago and the more recent lava domes are unlikely to be associated with significant heat reserves. Another geothermal area is found in the Cordón de Inacaliri range southeast from Apacheta-Aguilucho.

=== Sector collapse ===
A landslide deposit extends 4.5 kilometres (2.8 mi) away from the volcanic complex on its eastern flank. The landslide deposit covers a surface of about 3 square kilometres (1.2 sq mi), and a large collapse scar with signs of hydrothermal alteration faces the western end of the landslide. In its upper part, the deposit is bordered to the north and south by levees. Downslope, the deposit consists at first of a lobate structure that east of the Pabellón dome grades into a more hummocky deposit. The deposit is increasingly dominated by hydrothermally altered material farther east, while the hummocks consist of lava blocks. The material of the landslide deposit itself features both solid blocks and a finer matrix. Rocks involved in the landslide include both andesitic and dacitic lavas and hydrothermally altered material. The landslide deposit is confined between two older lava flows.

Sector collapses like the one at the Apacheta-Aguilucho volcanic complex have been observed on other volcanoes (such as Mount St Helens during its 1980 eruption), and they result in characteristic landslide deposits known as debris avalanche deposits; these feature hummock-like hills and often levees. Such collapses occur for different reasons for each event and are fairly common; in the Central Andes alone 14 volcanoes feature deposits of such collapses. Such deposits commonly feature a stratigraphy that resembles that of the source edifice, as well as jigsaw-like cracks in rocks that form when rocks disintegrate during the collapse and sliding.

In the case of Apacheta-Aguilucho, it is likely that the sector collapse was triggered by hydrothermal alteration of the edifice that weakened its structure until it failed, and its path was likely influenced by regional tectonics. After the edifice had failed, the landslide moved eastward until it was deflected by older topography; the material became increasingly fragmented.

== Geology ==
Off the west coast of South America, the Nazca Plate subducts beneath the South America Plate in the Peru-Chile Trench. This subduction process is responsible for volcanism in the Central Andes, which occurs at distances of 250–300 kilometres (160–190 mi) from the trench. There are about 200 volcanoes, including a dozen giant calderas.

Two major fault systems are found close to Apacheta-Aguilucho. The first is the major regional Calama-Olacapato-El Toro fault, the second fault system runs from neighbouring Inacaliri volcano northwest of Apacheta-Aguilucho towards the southeast, where it forms the Pabellóncito graben; the volcanic complex is built within that graben and the eruption of Pabellón was influenced by the graben faults, which allowed magma to reach the surface. The Pabellóncito fault system was active during the Pliocene until present-day, with seismic activity recorded in 2017 and 2020. The activity of these regional fault systems appears to be a consequence of tectonic regime changes during the early Pleistocene, which drove extensional tectonics in the area, or of gravitational spreading of the crust under the weight of volcanoes in the area. Northwest of Apacheta-Aguilucho, the axis of the graben is buried beneath other volcanoes starting with Cerro del Azufre which form a northwest–southeast alignment known as Inacaliri lineament.

The basement beneath Apacheta-Aguilucho is of Eocene to Miocene age. It consists of various volcanic and sedimentary formations including eroded volcanoes, and it is in part covered by 7.5 million years old ignimbrites.

=== Composition ===
Apacheta-Aguilucho has principally erupted andesite, dacite and rhyolite which define a potassium-rich calc-alkaline suite. These rocks define a potassium-rich calc-alkaline suite which contains amphibole, biotite, clinopyroxene, iron-titanium oxides, orthopyroxene, olivine, plagioclase, quartz, sanidine and titanite. Olivine is often altered to clay, goethite and hematite and there are areas of hydrothermally altered rocks on the eastern flank and in the summit fumarole field. At the fumarole field, minerals like chlorite, gypsum, halloysite, hematite, mica and quartz formed through supergene and acid leaching processes. The magmas appear to derive from the Altiplano-Puna magmatic complex volcanic body and underwent fractional crystallization and other geochemical processes before erupting.

== Eruption history ==
The volcanic complex is of Pliocene to Pleistocene age and developed over several different stages. In the first stage, the so-called Aguilucho ignimbrite consisting of moderately welded, white-to-pink pyroclastic flows was emplaced 7.5 ± 0.6 million years ago and andesitic lava flows 6.7 ± 0.3 million years ago. Subsequently, more lava flows were emplaced, consisting of blocky dacite.

The Apacheta and Aguilucho volcanoes were constructed consecutively. Apacheta consists of lava flows and pyroclastic material made out of andesite, and its crater is covered by pyroclastic flows and a 2.5 kilometres (1.6 mi) long rhyolitic lava flow. Aguilucho is constructed by lava flows. Finally, several lava flow fields were emplaced together with the lava domes Pabellón and Chac-Inca. 1,204,000 ± 33,000 years ago an ignimbrite named Aguilucho ignimbrite was erupted from the Apacheta volcano.

Apacheta grew between about 1.024 and 0.9 million years ago and Aguilucho between 0.7 and 0.6 million years ago. Lava flows on Apacheta-Aguilucho have been dated to 910,000 ± 140,000 and 700,000 ± 200,000 years before present, with one lava flow being dated to 652,000 ± 12,000 years ago. The date of the sector collapse is not known with certainty but was probably after the last lava flow was emplaced on Apacheta-Aguilucho.

Dating of Chac-Inca has produced an age of 140,000 ± 80,000 years before present. Different dates have been obtained on Cerro Pabellón: Potassium-argon dating yields an age of 130,000 - 80,000 years before present, while argon-argon dating has yielded an age of 50,000 ± 10,000 years before present. Their emplacement was presumably triggered by the entry of new magma into the magmatic system, and their ascent facilitated by the faults in the area. After the cessation of volcanic activity at Apacheta-Aguilucho, it appears to have migrated to the neighbouring Azufre volcano. Future eruptions may consist of small explosions with local impact, of perhaps phreatic nature. A local subsidence of the ground began in 2017 and ended in 2020 appears to be related to the beginning geothermal power extraction.

== Geothermal power production ==
The discovery of steam during the drilling of a freshwater well in the 1990s led to investigations by ENAP and UNOCAL in the area and the discovery of the fumaroles. In 2002, a joint enterprise by ENAP and CODELCO obtained the permission to explore the area, but while a geothermal system was discovered political questions about ENAP's involvement derailed the project.

Another joint enterprise this time including the Italian ENEL performed further research in the area between 2006 and 2007, and obtained a permit to exploit the system in 2009. The joint enterprise started the geothermal power project Cerro Pabellón, and in 2015 the construction of two power plants with a projected output of 24 MW each started, to be completed in 2017–2018. The plant on Pampa Apacheta 3.5 kilometres (2.2 mi) east of Apacheta-Aguilucho was inaugurated by the Chilean president Michelle Bachelet on 12 September 2017, becoming the first (Note: An earlier pilot plant operated in Copahue between 1988 and 1997.) geothermal power station in South America, and drew substantial media attention. As of 2021, it is the only operating one and geothermal power development in Chile has been slow. Situated at an elevation of over 4,500 metres (14,800 ft), it is the highest large-scale geothermal plant in the world. It draws water and steam from eight production wells, which are used to boil isopentane that then powers turbines; the condensate is reinjected into wells.

The Cerro Pabellón project is expected to produce 340 Gigawatt-hours per year, enough to cover the electricity consumption of 165,000 families. The plant is expected to reduce Chile's carbon dioxide emissions by about 166,000,000 kilograms per year (166,000 t/a) and is owned by the companies Geotérmica del Norte S.A.(GDN) and Empresa Nacional de Geotermia; the latter is a joint venture between ENAP and ENEL. A further expansion began in 2019 and was completed in 2022, aiming at increasing output by about 33 MW to 81 MW. There is ongoing research about the possibility of deriving lithium from geothermal brines. There was some controversy about the non-involvement of close indigenous communities. The plant uses hydrogen for energy storage.

== See also ==
- El Tatio
- Geothermal power in Chile
