= Cerro Chascon-Runtu Jarita complex =

Cerro Chascon-Runtu Jarita is a complex of lava domes located inside, but probably unrelated to, the Pastos Grandes caldera. It is part of the more recent phase of activity of the Altiplano-Puna volcanic complex.

Accompanied with little explosive activity on the main dome Cerro Chascon, it contains ten lava domes arranged in a chain. Located in the floor of the Pastos Grandes caldera, these domes were erupted after injection of mafic magmas in the deep less than 100,000 years ago. The largest dome has a volume of 5 cubic kilometres (1.2 cu mi).

== Geology ==
The complex is a chain of seven lava domes named Runtu Jarita whose largest member is named Cerro Chascon. This chain is comparable with the Mono-Inyo craters in the United States. Together with other lava domes like Cerro Chao this complex is part of the young surface expression of the APVC and may indicate the future location of a caldera.

=== Origins ===
The lava domes are contained within the moat and floor of the Pastos Grandes caldera, but it may not be part of that caldera complex proper. The lava dome complex is part of the Altiplano-Puna volcanic complex, an igneous province located in the Central Andes. During the Late Miocene-Pleistocene, large ignimbrite eruptions took place covering an area of 70,000 square kilometres (27,000 sq mi) triggered by the formation of melts deep in the crust and their subsequent rise to the upper crust.

Geochemical analysis led de Silva (1994) to suggest that they may be the latest eruptive cycle of the APVC, either as part of a reactivation or waning of that system. Pastos Grandes is the source of two major ignimbrites, the 8.1 mya Sifon and the 5.3 mya Chuhuilla ignimbrite, as well as the 3.1 mya Cerro Juvina ignimbrite shield on the northern caldera flank. The eruption of this complex may have been formed by a dyke.

=== Structure ===
The volcanic complex extends from 21°53′S 67°54′W to 22°02′S 67°49′W with base altitudes 4,600–4,900 metres (15,100–16,100 ft). The complex is split into a northern group encompassing Cerro Chascon and three other domes (named Cerro Guichi, Morro Chascoso and Pabelloncita Loma), and a southern group of six domes. Their orientation in northwestward direction is consistent with the regional trends but may also be influenced by the Pastos Grandes caldera structure. The arid climate of the area has impeded erosion in the area, leaving the volcanic complex relatively unaltered.

Cerro Chascon is formed from a cicle of lava flow lobes with a central plug with a diameter of 200 metres (660 ft). Explosive activity occurred before the dome formation and generated a 1 metre (3 ft 3 in) thick pumice deposit composed from rhyolitic obsidian beneath the dome. The lava dome has a volume of 5 cubic kilometres (1.2 cu mi) with a maximum altitude of 5,190 metres (17,030 ft). Its surface is covered by mounds (20 metres (66 ft) high) of presumably diapiric origin, with sand trails eroded from the mounds separating them.

Morro Chascoso and Pabelloncita Loma are cone shaped domes with blocky slopes with talus and central depressions. The much smaller Cerro Guichi (6 metres (20 ft) high and 25 metres (82 ft) long) may be an exposed intrusion, considering that it lacks any indication of surface flow. The two southernmost domes of the southern group have similar shapes to Chascoso and Pabelloncita. However the second southernmost dome is accompanied with an andesitic lava flow. The rest of the domes contain a silicic core with surrounding andesitic flows. The domes become less andesitic towards the north.

=== Petrology ===
The lavas of this complex are of potassium-rich calc-alkaline origin, and are highly viscous with large difference between two magma types. The lava domes are formed from andesite in the south and dacite in the north. The dacites are crystal rich and some lavas show evidence of magma mixing. Phenocryst contents ranges from 35% by volume in dacite and 48% by volume of rhyolite. In the northern group these are primarily composed from feldspar with minor components of amphibole, biotite and quartz. The southern group rocks have similar petrologies, but are of rhyolitic composition and contain mafic components. They contain a rhyolitic core surrounded with andesitic lavas that contains primarily plagioclase phenocrysts. Temperatures of 926–1,000 °C (1,699–1,832 °F) for dacitic lava and 625–727 °C (1,157–1,341 °F) for rhyolite lava have been estimated.

Petrology indicates that the andesitic lavas of the southern domes are derived from the more silicic magmas by addition of more mafic andesites. Conversely, the northern dome magmas formed by fractional crystallization with the most evolved components being erupted explosively.

=== Geologic history ===
The lava domes were erupted between 89,000 and 94,000 years ago. In Runtu Jarita, Argon-argon dating on sanidine has yielded ages of 88,000±4,000 to 97,000±2,000 BP. The eruption may have been caused by the injection of mafic magmas in the magmatic system. Presumably, the magmas were in the process of forming a pluton when the injection of new magmas led to eruption. The eruptions of Chascon initially were phreatomagmatic and influenced by local lakewaters. In the southern domes, some time occurred between the formation of the andesitic magmas by mixing and the eruption. Both andesitic and rhyolitic magmas were simultaneously extruded.

== See also ==
- Altiplano-Puna volcanic complex
- Cerro Chanka
- Cerro Chao
- Chillahuita
- Corral de Coquena
- Pastos Grandes
- Tocorpuri
