= Corral de Coquena =

Volcanic landform in the Andes

Coordinates: 23°26′S 67°28′W

Corral de Coquena is a volcanic spatter rampart in the Andes, over the Tropic of Capricorn. The rampart at its highest point is 4,572 metres (15,000 ft) high.

The structure has a width of 2.5 by 2.7 kilometres (1.6 mi × 1.7 mi) and is a discontinuous rampart 30–210 metres (98–689 ft) high. This rampart surrounds a sediment-filled crater that is 30–80 metres (98–262 ft) deep beneath the surrounding terrain. The deepest point is 4,363 metres (14,314 ft) high above sea level. The rampart is formed from two main bodies each up to 800 metres (2,600 ft) wide with gaps separating them. It is located in the southeastern portion of the moat which surrounds the 4 mya 60-by-35-kilometre (37 mi × 22 mi) La Pacana caldera.

Coquena formed along an outer ring fault. The caldera wall reaches its highest height in the area of Corral de Coquena. The basement beneath Corral de Coquena is slightly higher than the general Pacana caldera floor. The ring belongs to the post-caldera activity phase of La Pacana. The dating is uncertain; the ring is constructed on top of the Pampa Chamaca ignimbrite (2.4 mya) but one date obtained from the ring is 4.4 ± 0.3 mya, obtained on biotite. The date of the ring is more likely to be incorrect. Other estimates indicate that Pampa Chamaca overlies the Corral de Coquena deposits, an as yet unsettled question. The Atana ignimbrite that clearly pre-dates the Coquena ring has been reassessed as being 3.9-4.2 ± 0.1-0.2 mya old, reducing the estimated age of Corral de Coquena as well.

The rampart is formed by glassy rhyolite, or dacite, typical of the potassium-rich calc-alkaline series of the Central Volcanic Zone. It has a phenocryst content of 20%.

Dacite clasts cover the inward-sloping walls of the rampart. Outwards, lobes and terraces are found possibly formed by agglutinating dacite forming lava flows. The rhyolites too show evidence of flow structures and bedding.

In the Pliocene, destruction of a lava dome resulted in the formation of a pyroclastic deposit around Corral de Coquena. These deposits consists of volcanic ash, pumice and rhyolite, forming layers with angular pumice and ash and an overlying layer of vitric rhyolite, similar to the rampart wall. The deposits are up to 10 metres (33 ft) thick and cover a surface of c. 50 square kilometres (19 sq mi). Total volume is less than 1 cubic kilometre (0.24 cu mi). A later layer of reworked Atana and Corral de Coquena pyroclastics extends 2–3 kilometres (1.2–1.9 mi) away.

Aside from the lower phenocryst content, this lava is very similar to Morro Negro, another Pacana lava dome. Ilmenite, magnetite and quartz are found in the rhyolite. A water content of 3-4% and temperatures of 800 ± 50 °C (1,472 ± 90 °F) have been estimated on the basis of composition. The magma that formed Corral de Coquena is probably related to magmas that formed the Atana ignimbrite and were not erupted during that activity phase. Subsequently, part of these leaked out and formed Corral de Coquena.

The appearance of Corral de Coquena is similar to a maar. Despite the arid climate in the area which has persisted since the Miocene, the local water table (150 metres (490 ft) beneath the ground on the basis of water levels in nearby lakes) may have been high enough to trigger phreatomagmatic activity. This activity formed the crater. Later, lava itself erupted in the form of lava fountaining. Spatters formed by the fountaining then formed the Corral de Coquena rampart. This is an unusual mode of activity for silicic magmas but also documented at Huaynaputina and the Cerro Chascon-Runtu Jarita complex.
