= El Tatio =

Geyser field located in the Andes Mountains, Chile

Coordinates: 22°19′53″S 68°0′37″W

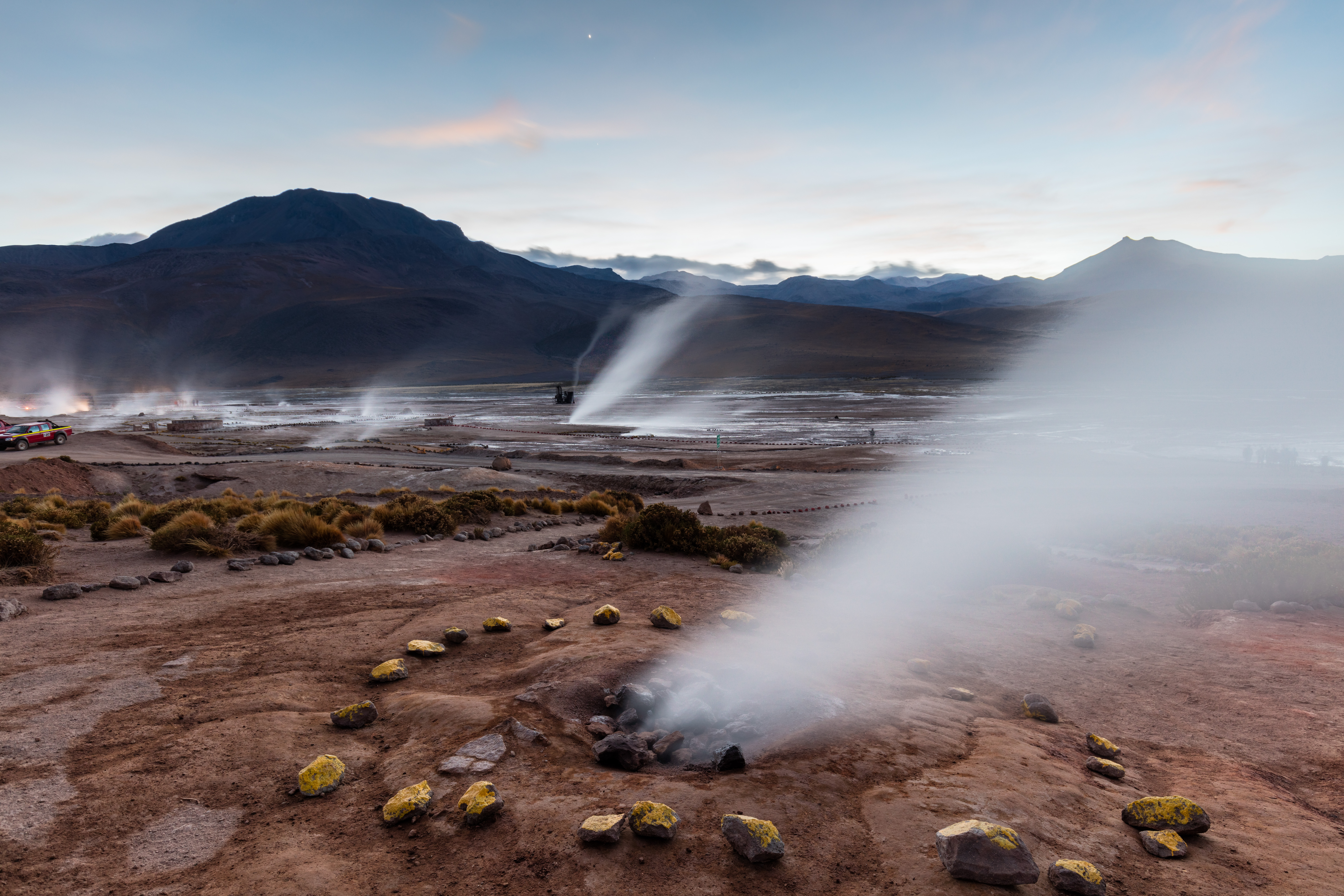
El Tatio geyser field

El Tatio is a geothermal field with many geysers located in the Andes Mountains of northern Chile at 4,320 metres (14,170 ft) above mean sea level. It is the third-largest geyser field in the world and the largest in the Southern Hemisphere. Various meanings have been proposed for the name "El Tatio", including "oven" or "grandfather". The geothermal field has many geysers, hot springs, and associated sinter deposits. (Note: Sinter is a form of silica that is formed by its precipitation from hot waters. Microbes can live in pores within the sinter.) The water from these hot springs eventually forms the Rio Salado, a major tributary of the Rio Loa, significantly increasing the amount of arsenic in the river. The geothermal vents are sites of populations of extremophile microorganisms such as hyperthermophiles, and El Tatio has been studied as an analogue for the early Earth and possible past life on Mars.

El Tatio lies at the western foot of a series of stratovolcanoes which runs along the border between Chile and Bolivia. This series of volcanoes is part of the Central Volcanic Zone (one of several volcanic belts in the Andes), and of the Altiplano–Puna volcanic complex (APVC) – a system of large calderas and associated ignimbrites which were the sources of supereruptions between 10 million and 1 million years ago. Some of these calderas may be the source of heat for the El Tatio geothermal system. There are no recorded eruptions of the Tatio volcanoes in the historical period.

The field is a major tourism destination in northern Chile. It was prospected over the last century for geothermal power production, but development efforts were discontinued after a major incident in 2009 in which a geothermal well blew out, creating a steam column. The blowout caused a political controversy about geothermal power development in Chile.

== Name and research history ==
The term "tatio" comes from the nearly-extinct Kunza language; known meanings of the word include 'to appear' and 'oven', but it has also been translated as 'grandfather' (whose tears form the geysers) or 'burnt'. The geyser field is also known as the Copacoya geysers; Copacoya is the name of a mountain in the area.

The earliest mentions of geysers in the region are from the late 19th century, and they were already well known by 1952. The first geothermal prospecting of the field occurred in the 1920s and the field was mentioned in academic literature in 1943. More systematic research took place in 1967–1982; most research on this geothermal field was done in the context of geothermal prospecting.

== Geography and geomorphology ==
Location of El Tatio in northern Chile close to the border between Chile and Bolivia.

El Tatio lies in the municipality of Calama, Antofagasta Province of northern Chile close to the border between Chile and Bolivia. (Note: As established by the Treaty of Peace and Friendship of 1904, the border between Bolivia and Chile runs along the drainage divide on the Cordillera del Tatio.) The field is located 89–80 kilometres (55–50 mi) north of the town San Pedro de Atacama and 100 kilometres (62 mi) east of the town of Calama; Chile Route B-245 connects El Tatio to San Pedro de Atacama. Towns close to El Tatio are Toconce to the north, Caspana to the west and Machuca to the south. A workers' camp for a sulfur mine at Volcan Tatio was reported to exist in 1959. The old Inca trail from San Pedro de Atacama to Siloli crossed the geyser field; the Inca also operated a mountain sanctuary on Volcan Tatio. There are several unpaved roads and all parts of the field are easily accessible by foot.

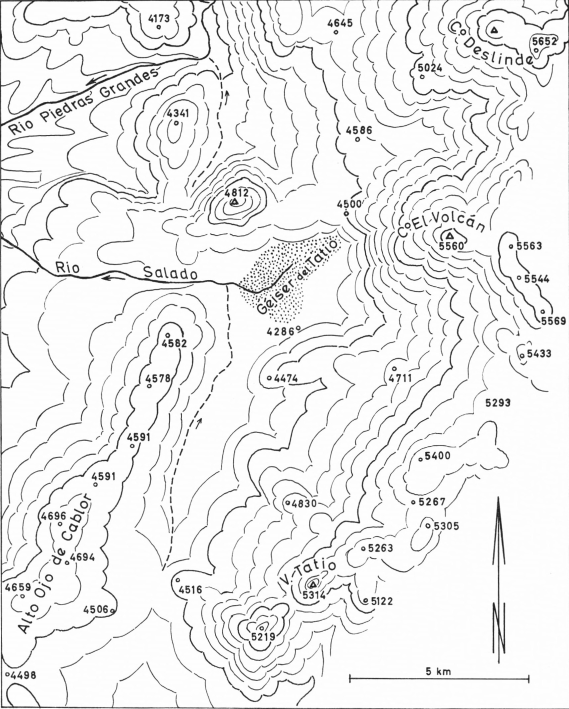
Topography of the El Tatio region

El Tatio is part of the Central Volcanic Zone, a segment of the Andes between 14° and 28° south latitude where the Andes are volcanically active. This volcanism manifests itself with about 10 silicic caldera complexes of the Altiplano–Puna volcanic complex and more than 50 recently active volcanoes; Lascar volcano erupted in 1993 and produced a tall eruption column.

East of the field, andesitic stratovolcanoes reach elevations of about 5,000 metres (16,000 ft). From north to south, the andesitic stratovolcanoes include the 5,651-metre (18,540 ft) or 5,696-metre (18,688 ft) high Cerro Deslinde which is the highest in the area, the 5,560-metre (18,240 ft) high Cerro El Volcan, the 5,280–5,570-metre (17,320–18,270 ft) high Cordillera del Tatio and the 5,314-metre (17,434 ft) high Volcan Tatio, which collectively form the El Tatio volcanic group (Note: The toponymy of the Cordillera del Tatio varies between maps.) which is part of a larger north-south trending chain of Pleistocene volcanoes. The Sierra de Tucle lies to the southwest of the field.

Mountains southwest of El Tatio include the 4,570–4,690-metre (14,990–15,390 ft) high Alto Ojo del Cablor range, while 4,812-metre (15,787 ft) high Cerro Copacoya is situated northwest of the geothermal field. Volcanism with dacitic composition, older than the easterly stratovolcanoes, has occurred west of El Tatio; this volcanism was known as the "liparitic formation" and it covers large areas in the region. (Note: The "Liparitic formation" was later divided into a number of additional geological formations.)

Firn and snow fields were reported in the middle 20th century on the El Tatio volcanic group, at elevations of 4,900–5,200 metres (16,100–17,100 ft). The region is too dry to support glaciers today, but in the past higher moisture allowed their formation on mountains of this part of the Andes. Glacially eroded mountains and moraines testify to their existence in the form of large valley glaciers. A large moraine complex, including both terminal structures and well-developed lateral moraines, can be found north of the geyser field and reflects the past existence of a 10 kilometres (6.2 mi) long glacier, the longest valley glacier in the region. Two more moraine systems extend westward both northeast and southeast of El Tatio, and the terrain surrounding the geyser field is covered by sands that are interpreted as glacial outwash sands. Surface exposure dating indicates that some moraines were emplaced at or before the Last Glacial Maximum and others in a time period 35,000 to 40,000 years before present. (Note: Elsewhere in the Central Andes a glacier advance has been inferred about 40,000 years ago, at the same time as the Inca Huasi lake stage in the Altiplano.) Smaller moraines at higher altitude may date to the Antarctic Cold Reversal or the Younger Dryas climate periods; moraines related to the Lake Tauca stage are either absent or restricted to high elevation sites.

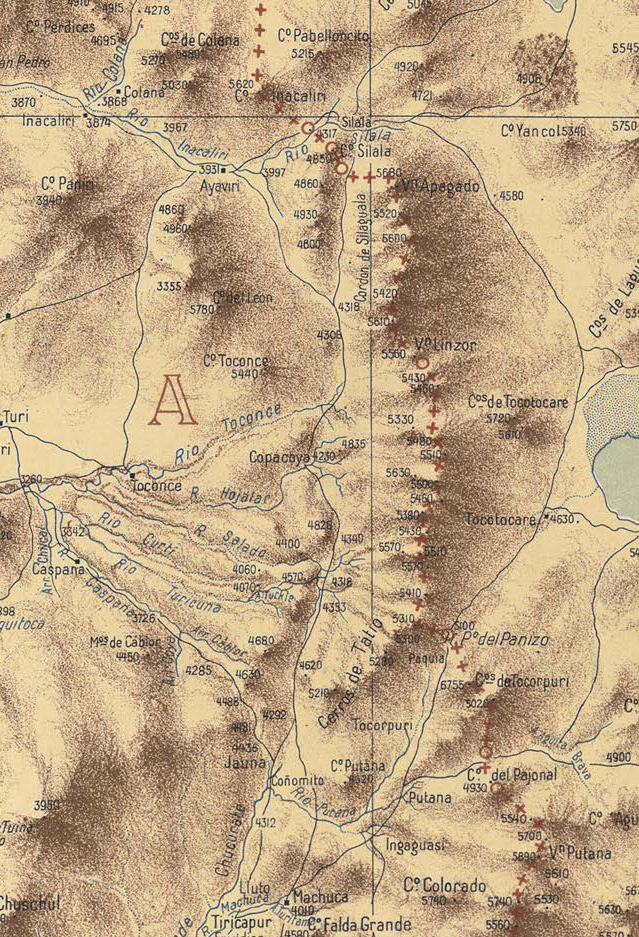
1910 map of the region

Drainage in the area is generally from east to west down the Occidental Cordillera, often in form of steeply incised valleys. The Rio Salado drains most of the hot spring water and has its headwaters in the field where it is joined by the Rio Tucle and the Vicuna stream. Temperature measurements of the water flowing to the Rio Salado have yielded values of 17–32 °C (63–90 °F), while the discharge of the Rio Salado amounts to 0.25–0.5 m^{3}/s. The Rio Salado eventually joins the Rio Loa, a major source of freshwater for the region; thus, El Tatio plays an important role in the regional water supply. In the early 20th century there were several hydraulic engineering projects at El Tatio, aiming either to use its waters or to mitigate its impact on downstream water quality.

=== Geothermal field ===
El Tatio is well known as a geothermal field in Chile, and is the largest geyser field in the Southern Hemisphere with about 8% of all geysers in the world. Only the fields at Yellowstone in the United States and Dolina Geizerov in Russia are larger. They also have taller geysers than at El Tatio, where geyser fountains are on average only 75 centimetres (30 in) high. Together with Sol de Mañana, which is just east of El Tatio in Bolivia, it is also the highest-altitude geyser field in the world.

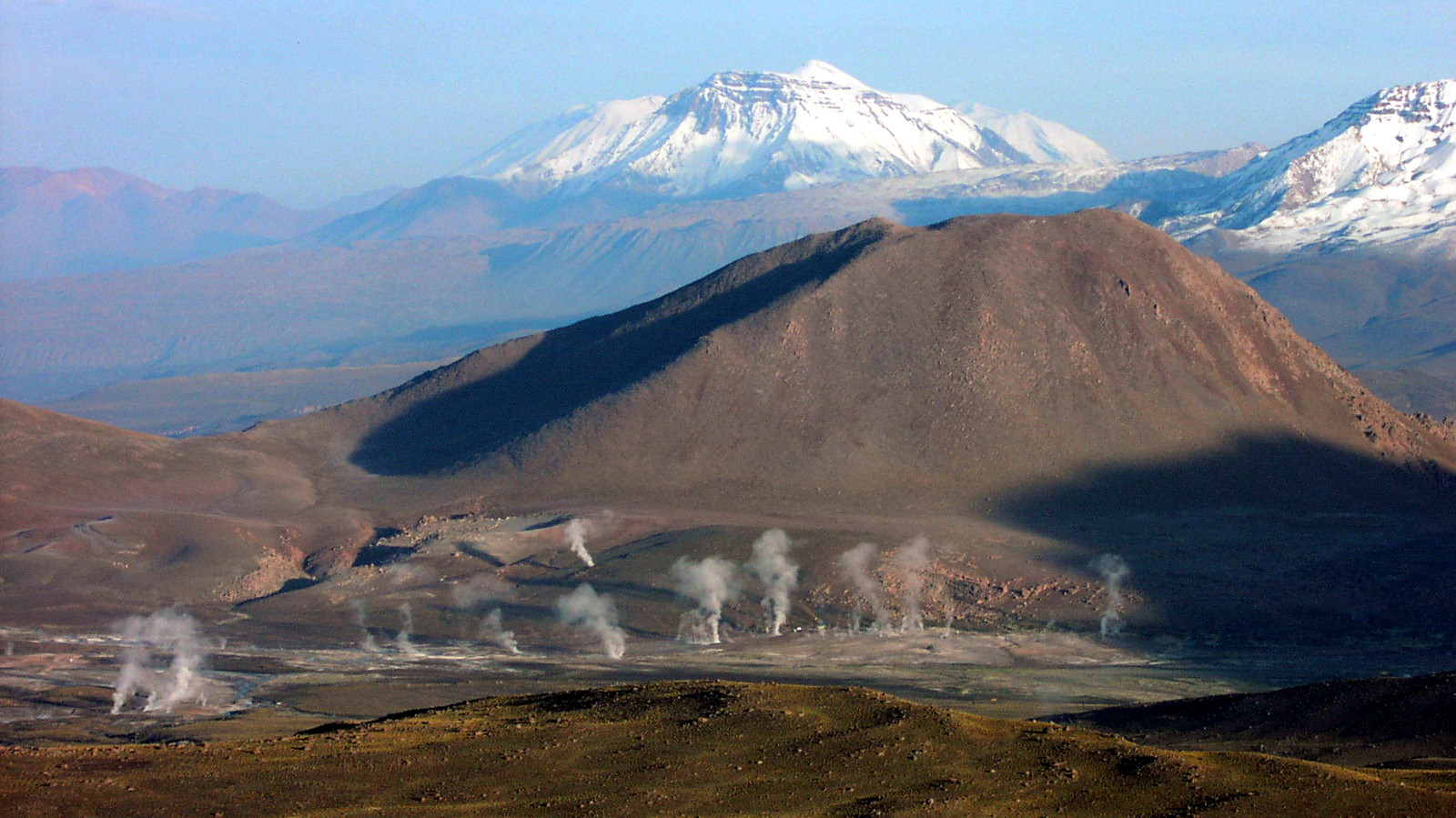
The Andes rise behind El Tatio

The geothermal field covers an area of 30 square kilometres (12 sq mi) at elevations of 4,200–4,600 metres (13,800–15,100 ft), and is characterized by fumaroles, hot springs, noisy steam vents and steaming soil. Stronger geothermal activity is located within three discrete areas covering a total of 10 square kilometres (3.9 sq mi) surface, and includes boiling water fountains, hot springs, geysers, mudpots, mud volcanoes and sinter terraces; further, chimneys of extinct geysers have been noted. One of these three areas lies within a valley, the second on a flat surface and the third along the banks of the Rio Salado. The first area offers a notable contrast between the snow-covered Andes, the coloured hills that surround the field and the white deposits left by the geothermal activity. Most geysers of El Tatio are found here and are particularly noticeable in cold weather. A similar landscape exists at the third (lower) area, with the presence of the Rio Salado river adding an additional element to the landscape. The second area is located between a creek and a hill and includes an artificial 15-by-30-metre (49 ft × 98 ft) pool for tourists. Its vents often have higher discharges than others in the field.

About 110 documented geothermal manifestations have been documented at El Tatio, but the total has been estimated at 400. The field once numbered 67 geysers and more than three hundred hot springs. Many vents are linked to fractures that run northwest–southeast or southwest–northeast across the field. Some geyser fountains in the past reached heights greater than 10 metres (33 ft); usually, however, they do not exceed 1 metre (3 ft 3 in) and their activity sometimes varies over time. A few geysers have received names, such as Boiling Geyser, El Cobreloa, El Cobresal, El Jefe, Terrace Geyser, Tower Geyser and Vega Rinconada. Minor eruptions of the geysers occur approximately every dozen minutes and major eruptions every few hours on average, and major eruptions take place after the conduit was "prepared" by multiple smaller ones. The terrain surrounding a geyser tilts as it recharges and discharges. An additional geothermal system lies southeast of and at elevations above El Tatio and is characterized by steam-heated ponds fed by precipitation water, and solfataric activity has been reported on the stratovolcanoes farther east.

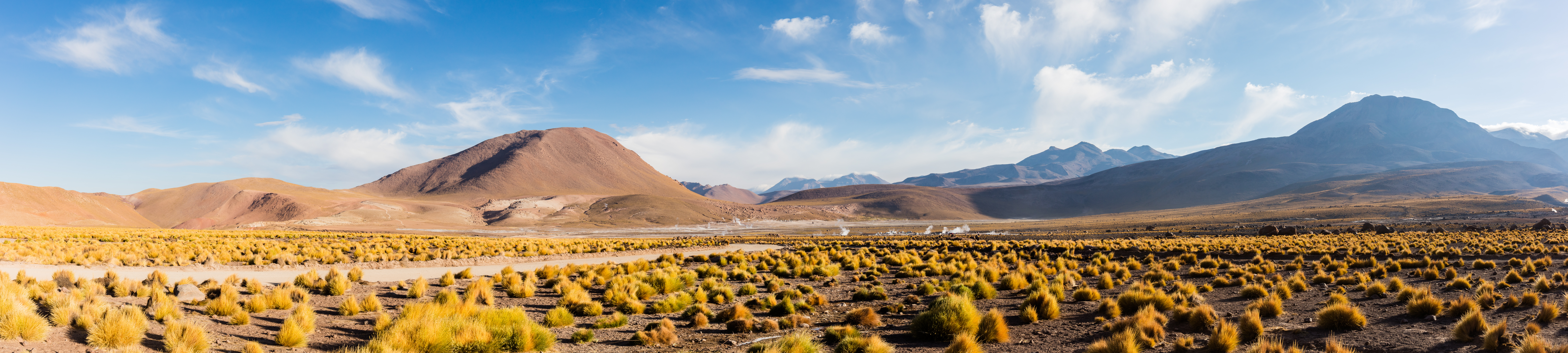
The sinter landscape formed at El Tatio

Deposition of sinter from the waters of the geothermal field has given rise to spectacular landforms, including, but not limited to mounds, terraced pools, geyser cones and the dams that form their rims. Small-scale features include cones, crusts, mollusc-shaped formations, waterfall-like surfaces and very small terraces. These sinter deposits cover an area of about 30 square kilometres (12 sq mi) and include both active and inactive deposits, both of which were emplaced on glacial sediments. High contents of silica give the waters a blueish colour, organic compounds such as carotenoids conversely often colour the sinter with orange-brown, and greenish hues are owing to iron-oxidizing bacteria. Sinter accumulation is so rapid that debris and microbes can become entrapped and preserved in the sinter. Owing to the dry climate, the sinter deposits are subject to only little erosion.

Individual vent types and deposits found at El Tatio include:

- Hot springs form pools with water temperatures of 60–80 °C (140–176 °F), which are often gently moving and surging and in the case of the warmer springs actively bubbling. These pools often contain ball-like rocks called oncoids and are surrounded by sinter rims, which have spicule-like textures. These sinter rims often form dam-like structures around deeper vents which are filled with water. Spherical grains develop in the hot springs as a consequence of hydrodynamic processes, and include biogenic material; during the growth of the sinter they often end up embedded in the material.
- Water draining from the springs deposits sinter, which can form fairly thick deposits and large aprons when sheet flow occurs, known as "discharge deposits"; sometimes terraces are developed instead. As in springs, oncoids and spicules are observed in channels. Much of the water evaporates and its temperature drops from 30–35 °C (86–95 °F) to less than 20 °C (68 °F) away from the springs; the low air temperatures cause it to freeze occasionally, resulting in frost weathering.
- Geysers and also water fountains discharge from up to 3-metre (9.8 ft) high cones with gently sloping surfaces, which sometimes support splash mounds. The cones are made out of geyserite. Other geysers and fountains instead discharge from within rim-bounded pools, and some geysers are in the bed of the Rio Salado river. The activity of geysers is not stable over time; changes in water supply or in the properties of the conduit that supplies them can cause changes in their eruptive activity. Such changes can be triggered by rainfall events or earthquakes and at El Tatio geyser behaviour changes have been linked to the 2014 Iquique earthquake and a 2013 precipitation event. The water of geysers is 80–85 °C (176–185 °F) hot.
- Mud pools are often bubbling, with the hot mud fountaining. They are mainly found at the edges of the geothermal field and often produce highly acidic water; it converts rocks to clays. Simmering pools of water have been recorded at El Tatio as well.
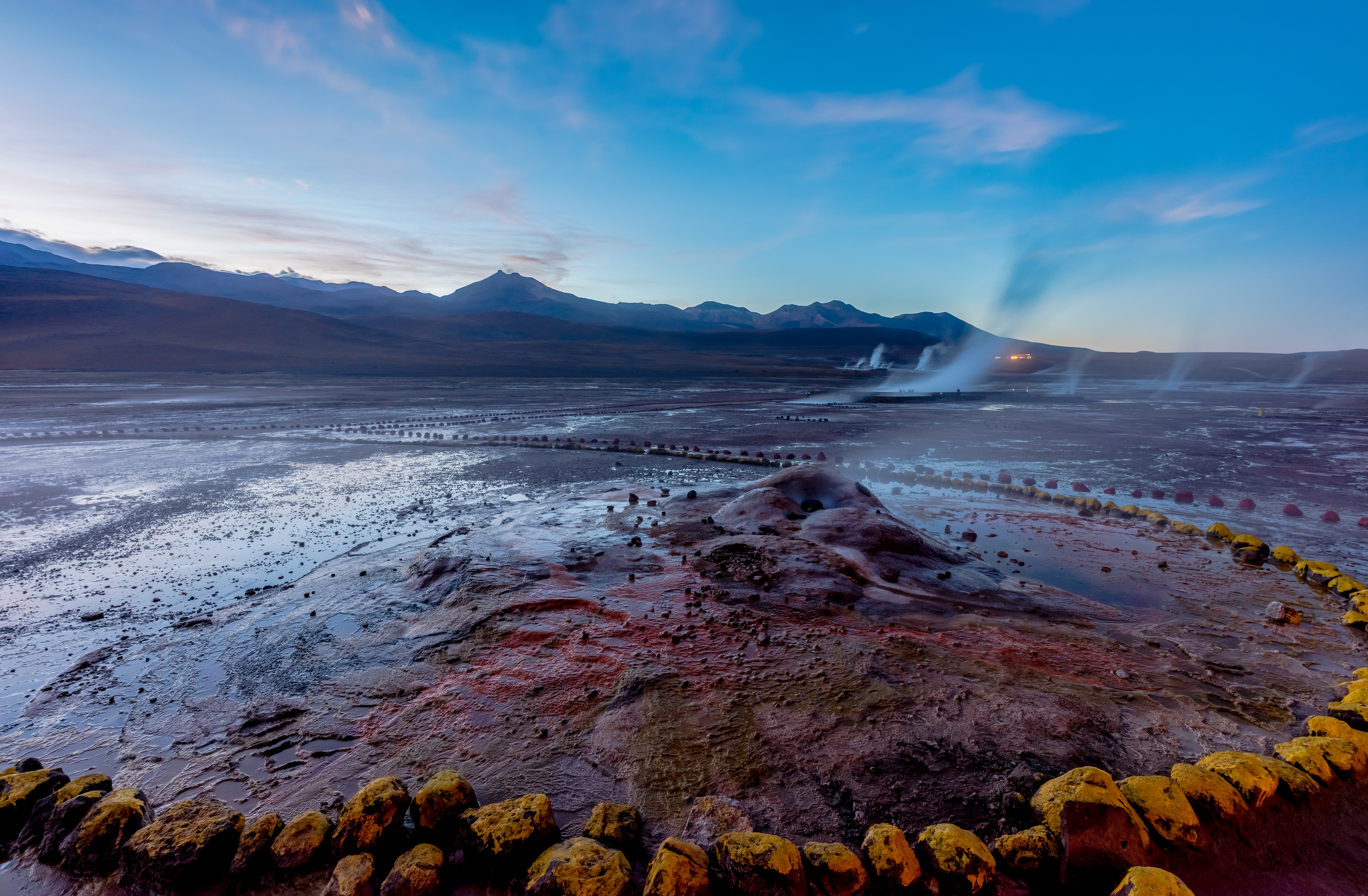
A vent surrounded by yellow rocks

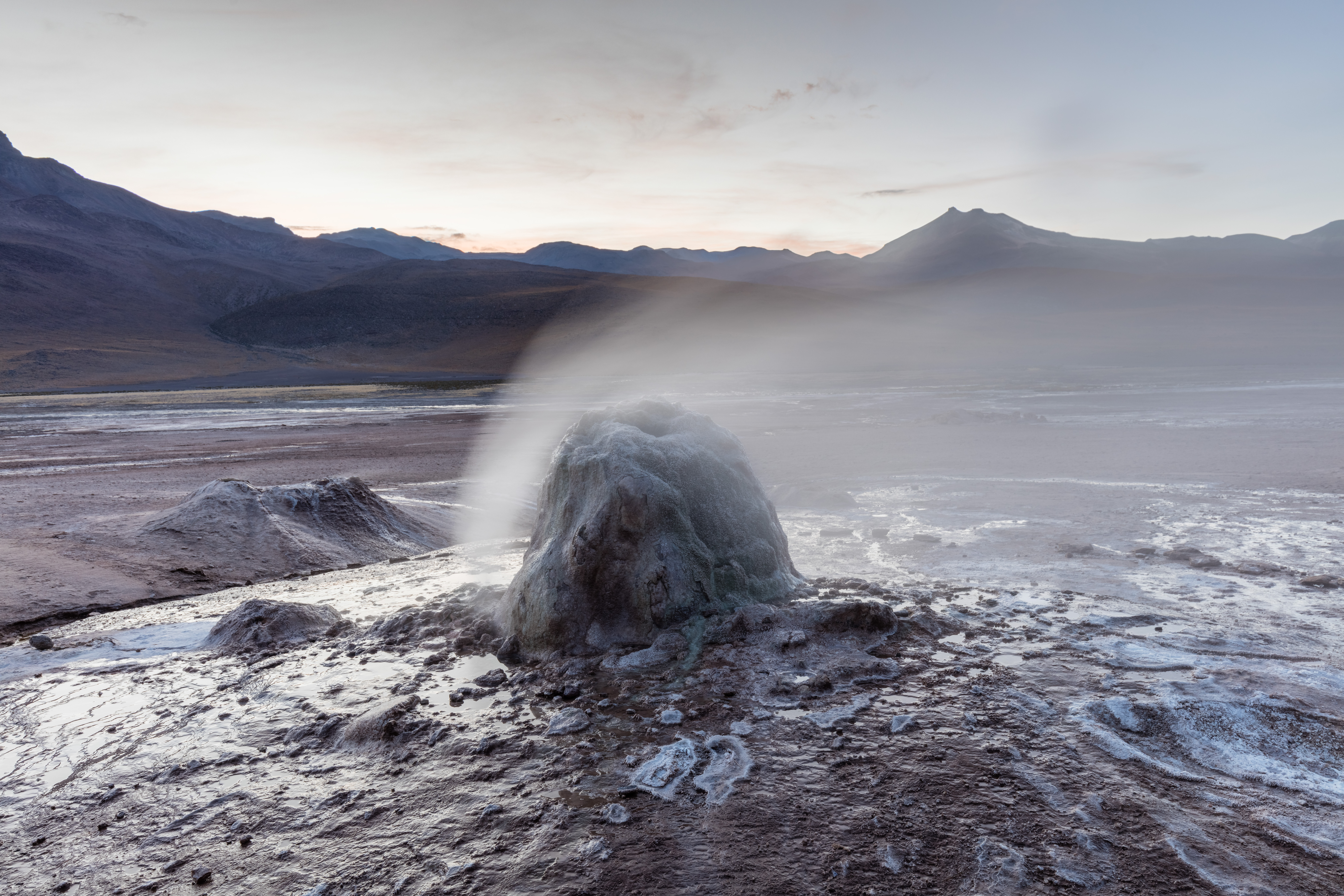
Geyser cone

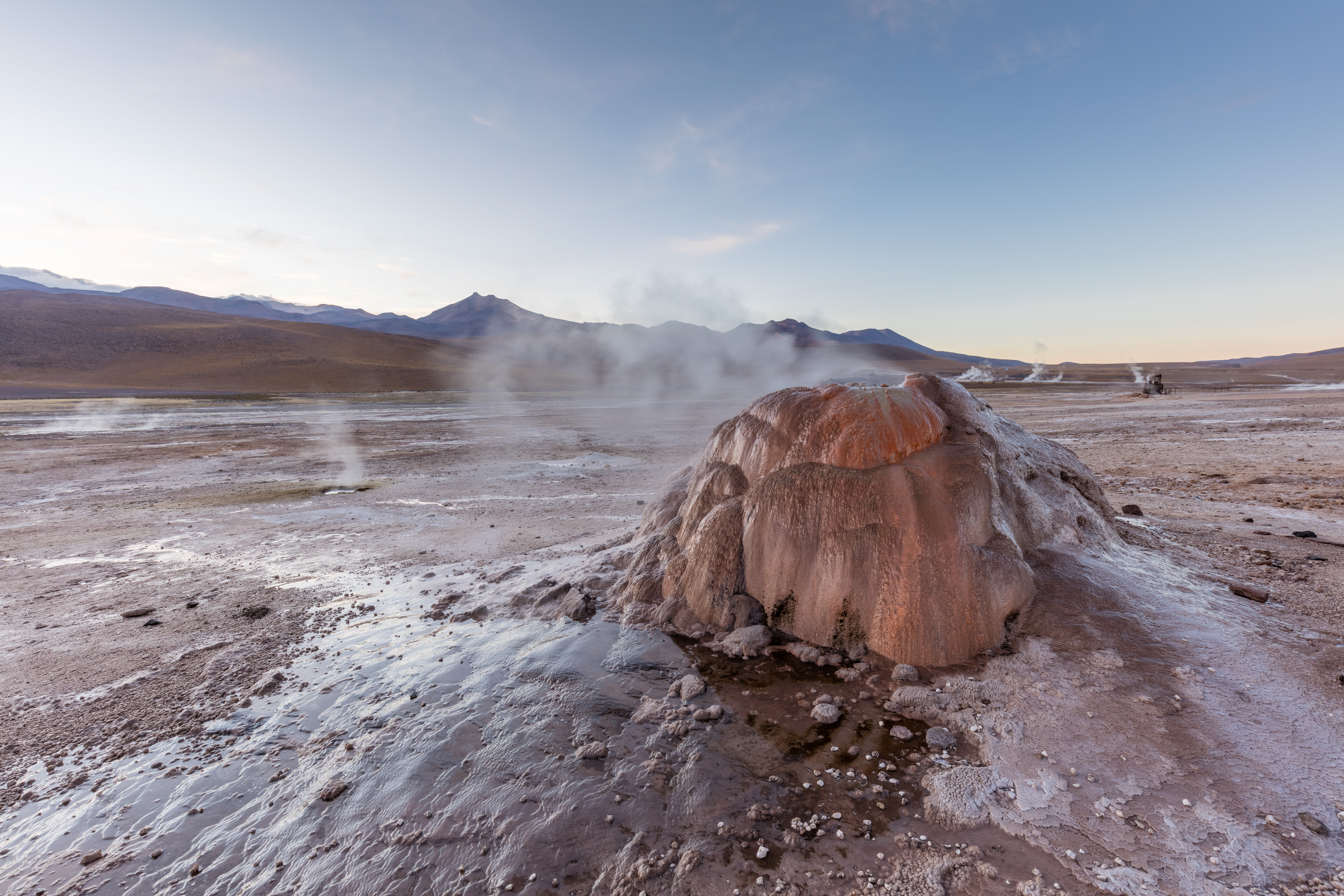
Geyser cone

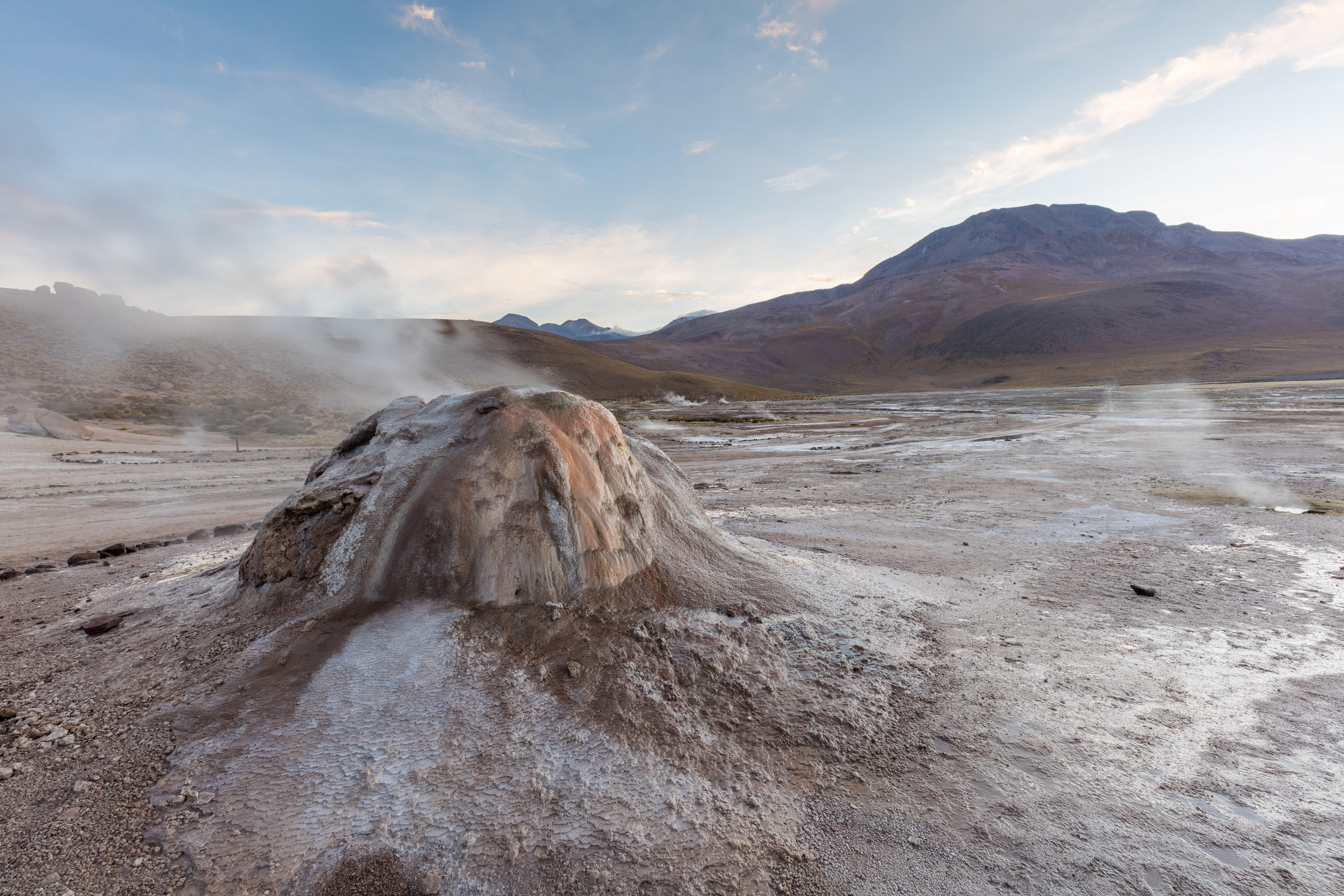
Geyser cone

== Geology ==
Subduction of the Nazca Plate beneath the South American Plate is responsible for the formation of the Andes. Volcanism does not occur along the entire length of the Andes; there are three volcanic zones called the Northern Volcanic Zone, the Central Volcanic Zone and the Southern Volcanic Zone, all separated by areas with no Holocene-age volcanism.

El Tatio and a number of other geothermal fields such as Sol de Mañana are part of the Altiplano–Puna volcanic complex. The region was dominated by andesitic volcanism producing lava flows until the late Miocene, then large-scale ignimbrite activity took place between 10 and 1 million years ago. This ignimbrite volcanism is part of the APVC proper and produced about 10,000 cubic kilometres (2,400 cu mi) of ignimbrites, covering a surface area of 50,000 square kilometres (19,000 sq mi). The APVC activity continued into the Holocene with the emission of voluminous lava domes and lava flows, and Tatio was one of the last volcanic centres in the APVC to erupt; the present-day uplift of the Uturunku volcano in Bolivia may signal ongoing activity of the APVC. The APVC is underpinned by a large magma chamber with the shape of a sill, the Altiplano-Puna Magma Body; a number of volcanoes and geothermal systems including El Tatio are geographically associated with the Altiplano-Puna Magma Body.

The Laguna Colorada caldera lies east of El Tatio. The terrain at El Tatio is formed by Jurassic–Cretaceous sediments of marine and volcanic origin, Tertiary–Holocene volcanic formations that were emplaced in various episodes, and recent sediments formed by glaciers, alluvium, colluvium and material formed by the geothermal field, such as sinter. Volcanic formations fill the Tatio graben, including the Miocene Rio Salado ignimbrite and related volcanics which reach thicknesses of 1,900 metres (6,200 ft) in some places, the Sifon ignimbrite, the Pliocene Puripicar ignimbrite and the Pleistocene Tatio ignimbrite; the Puripicar ignimbrite crops out farther west. Active volcanoes in the area include Putana and Tocorpuri.

Hydrothermal alteration of country rock at El Tatio has yielded large deposits of alteration minerals such as adularia, anhydrite, albite, calcite, celadonite, chlorite, illite, montmorillonite, siderite and smectite. The summit parts of several volcanoes of the El Tatio volcanic group have been bleached and discoloured by hydrothermal activity.

=== Hydrology ===
Most of the water that is discharged by the hot springs appears to originate as precipitation, which enters the ground east and southeast of El Tatio. The source of heat of the complex appears to be the Laguna Colorada caldera, the El Tatio volcanic group, the Cerro Guacha and Pastos Grandes calderas or the Altiplano-Puna Magma Body. The movement of the water in the ground is controlled by the permeability of the volcanic material and the Serrania de Tucle–Loma Lucero tectonic block west of El Tatio that acts as an obstacle. As it moves through the ground, it acquires heat and minerals and loses steam through evaporation. Unlike geothermal fields in wetter parts of the world, given the dry climate of the area, local precipitation has little influence on the hot springs hydrology at El Tatio. Neither magmatic water nor water from local precipitation are mixed into this water. The time the water takes to traverse the whole path from precipitation to the springs is considered to be either 15 years or more than 60, and three-quarters of the heat is transported by steam.

The water travels through a number of aquifers that correspond to permeable rock formations, such as the Salado and Puripicar ignimbrites, the Tucle dacites as well as through faults and fractures in the rock. It steeply ascends under El Tatio, partially along faults and boundaries between rock units, and appears to be confined between northeast-trending fault systems such as the "Tatio fault". Three separate geothermal reservoirs have been identified, which underlie the Cerros del Tatio and extend to the La Torta volcano; they are connected by, and partly formed in cavities formed by faults. The Puripicar ignimbrite appears to be the main hydrothermal reservoir, with temperatures reaching 253 °C (487 °F). The total heat output of El Tatio is about 120–170 MW. The hydrothermal system beneath El Tatio appears to extend to the neighbouring La Torta system. The layout of the hydrothermal system has been inferred through geochemical and geophysical techniques, such as magnetotelluric data and boreholes.

Depending on the season, the hot springs yield 0.25–0.5 m^{3}/s of water at temperatures reaching the local boiling point. The water is rich in minerals, especially sodium chloride and silica. Other compounds and elements in order of increasing concentration are antimony, rubidium, strontium, bromine, magnesium, caesium, lithium, arsenic, sulfate, boron, potassium and calcium. Inorganic carbon (carbonate) occurs at a low concentration.

Some of these minerals are toxic, especially arsenic which pollutes a number of waters in the region. Arsenic concentrations in waters at El Tatio can reach 40–50 mg/L – among the highest concentrations found in hot springs of the whole world – and 11 g/kg in sediments. Producing about 500 tonnes per year (16 long ton/Ms), El Tatio is a principal source of arsenic in the Rio Loa system, and arsenic pollution in the region has been linked to health issues in the population.

Composition of these hot springs is not uniform in El Tatio, with chloride content decreasing from the northern springs over the southwestern ones to the eastern springs, where sulfate is more frequent. This sulfate enrichment appears to be driven by the steam-driven evaporation of the hot spring water, with the sulfate forming when hydrogen sulfide is oxidized by atmospheric oxygen. The decreasing chloride content on the other hand appears to be due to drainage coming from the east diluting the southern and western and especially eastern spring systems.

=== Fumaroles ===
Steam vents are particularly noticeable in the morning hours when the steam columns emanating from them are visible, and temperatures of 48.3–91.6 °C (118.9–196.9 °F) have been found. Carbon dioxide is the most important fumarole gas, followed by hydrogen sulfide. The amount of water relative to these two gases is variable, probably due to condensation of water in the ground.

Additional components include argon, helium, hydrogen, methane, neon, nitrogen and oxygen. Characteristically for fumarole gases on convergent plate boundaries, much of this nitrogen is non-atmospheric. However, atmospheric air is also involved in generating the chemistry of the El Tatio fumarole gases.

=== Composition of spring deposits ===
Opal is the most important component of sinter associated with hot springs; halite, sylvite and realgar are less common and with rare occurrences of other minerals like nobleite, teruggite and ulexite. This dominance of opal is because usually conditions favour its precipitation from water but not of other minerals, and it occurs both in subaqueous environments and on surfaces that are only occasionally wetted. During the precipitation, the opal forms tiny spheres which can aggregate as well as glassy deposits.

Halite and other evaporites are more commonly encountered on the sinter surfaces outside of the hot springs, and while opal dominates these environments too, sassolite and teruggite are found in addition to the aforementioned four minerals in the discharge deposits. Cahnite has also been identified in sinter deposits. Volcanic minerals such as plagioclase and quartz are found within cavities of the sinter. Sandstone formed by debris flows and redeposited volcanic material is found embedded in sinter at some localities. Finally, antimony, arsenic and calcium form sulfidic deposits in some springs.

Various facies have been identified in drill cores through the sinter, including arborescent, columnar, fenestral palisade, laminated (both inclined and planar), particulate, spicular and tufted structures. These structures contain varying amounts of microfossils and formed at diverse temperatures and locations of individual sinter mounds. Microorganisms and material like pollen is found integrated within the sinter deposits. The rate at which sinter is deposited has been estimated at 1.3–3.4 kilograms per square metre per year (0.27–0.70 pdr/ft^{2}/a).

== Climate and biology ==
The climate is dry with about 44 millimetres (1.7 in) precipitation per year. Most of it falls between December and March, a precipitation pattern mediated by the South American monsoon and by the South Pacific High which is responsible for the dry climate. The whole Central Andes were wetter in the past, resulting in the formation of lakes such as Lake Tauca in the Altiplano. This, and a colder climate, resulted in the development of glaciers at El Tatio, which have left moraines.

The region is additionally rather windy with mean windspeeds of 3.7–7.5 metres per second (12–25 ft/s), which influence the hot springs by enhancing evaporation and imparting a directional growth to certain finger-like sinter deposits. The evaporation rates per month reach 131.9 millimetres (5.19 in) and they facilitate the deposition of sinters. There is a diurnal cycle in wind and atmospheric humidity, with no wind and high humidity during the night and wind with low humidity during the day. The atmospheric pressure at this elevation drops to about 0.58 atmospheres, lowering the boiling point of water to about 86 °C (187 °F).

Apart from precipitation, the area is characterized by extreme temperature variations between day and night which can reach 40 °C (72 °F) and induce freeze-thaw cycles. The Chilean Dirección General del Agua operates a weather station at El Tatio; according to data from this station air temperatures average 3.6 °C (38.5 °F) and precipitation 250 millimetres per year (9.8 in/year). El Tatio further features high ultraviolet (UV) insolation, which can reach 33 W/m^{2} UV-A and 6 W/m^{2} UV-B. The low atmospheric pressure and high UV irradiation has led scientists to treat El Tatio as an analogue for environments on Mars, its dry vegetation-free environment has invited comparisons to Earth's Archaean epoch.

The dry grassland vegetation of the region is classified as Central Andean dry puna and lies above the treeline. About 90 plant species have been identified at El Tatio and surroundings, such as the endemic Adesmia atacamensis, Calceolaria stellariifolia, Junellia tridactyla and Opuntia conoidea. Tussock grasses like Anatherostipa, Festuca and Stipa occur at 3,900–4,400 metres (12,800–14,400 ft) elevation, while rosette and cushion plants reach elevations of 4,800 metres (15,700 ft); these include Azorella, Chaetanthera, Mulinum, Senecio, Lenzia, Pycnophyllum and Valeriana. Bushland species include Lenzia chamaepitys, Senecio puchii and Perezia atacamensis, while Arenaria rivularis, Oxychloe andina and Zameioscirpus atacamensis grow in wetlands. Riparian vegetation occurs along the Rio Salado. Among the animals in the region are chinchillas and viscachas and llamas, mainly the vicuña.

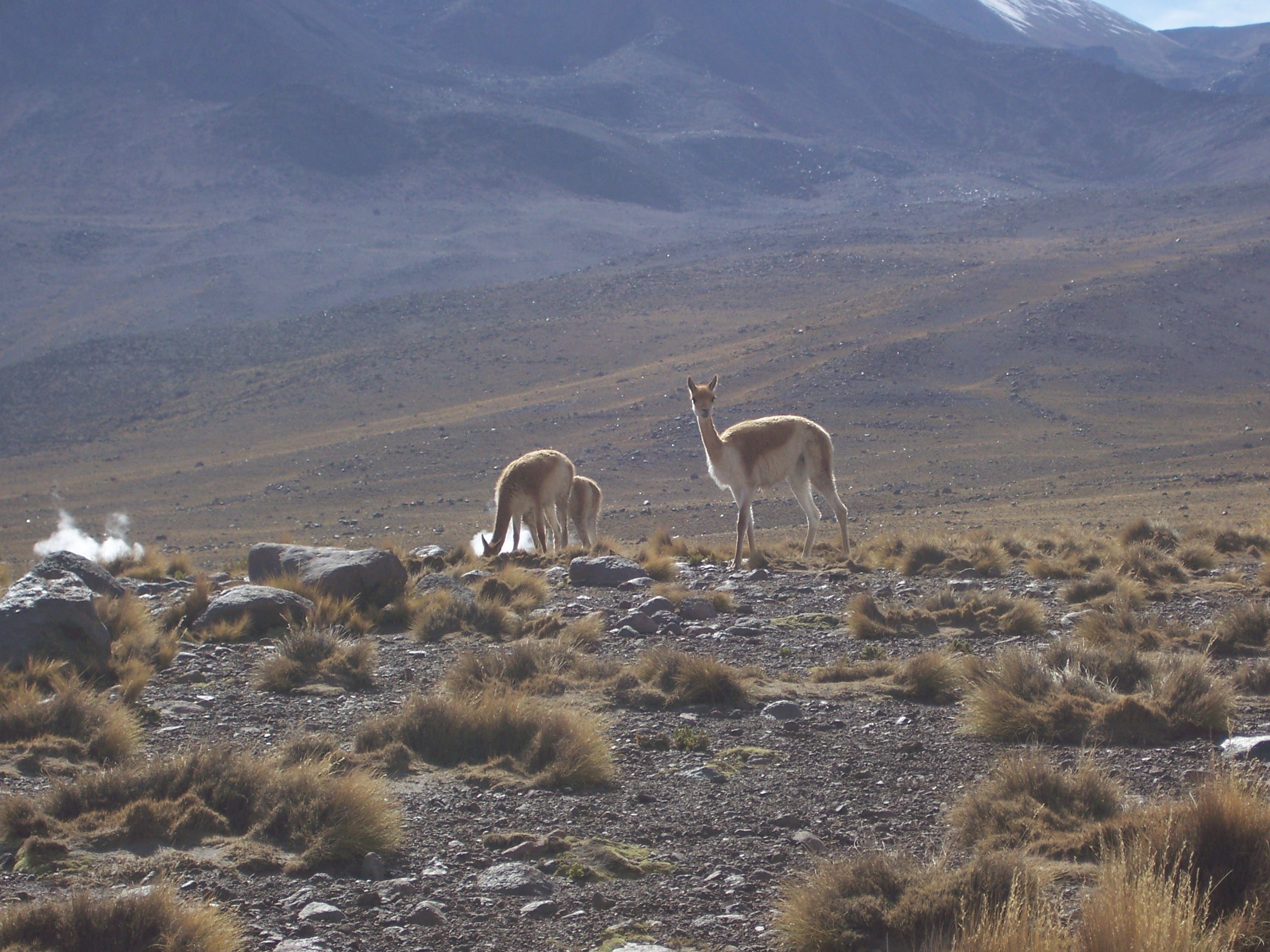
Vicuñas at El Tatio

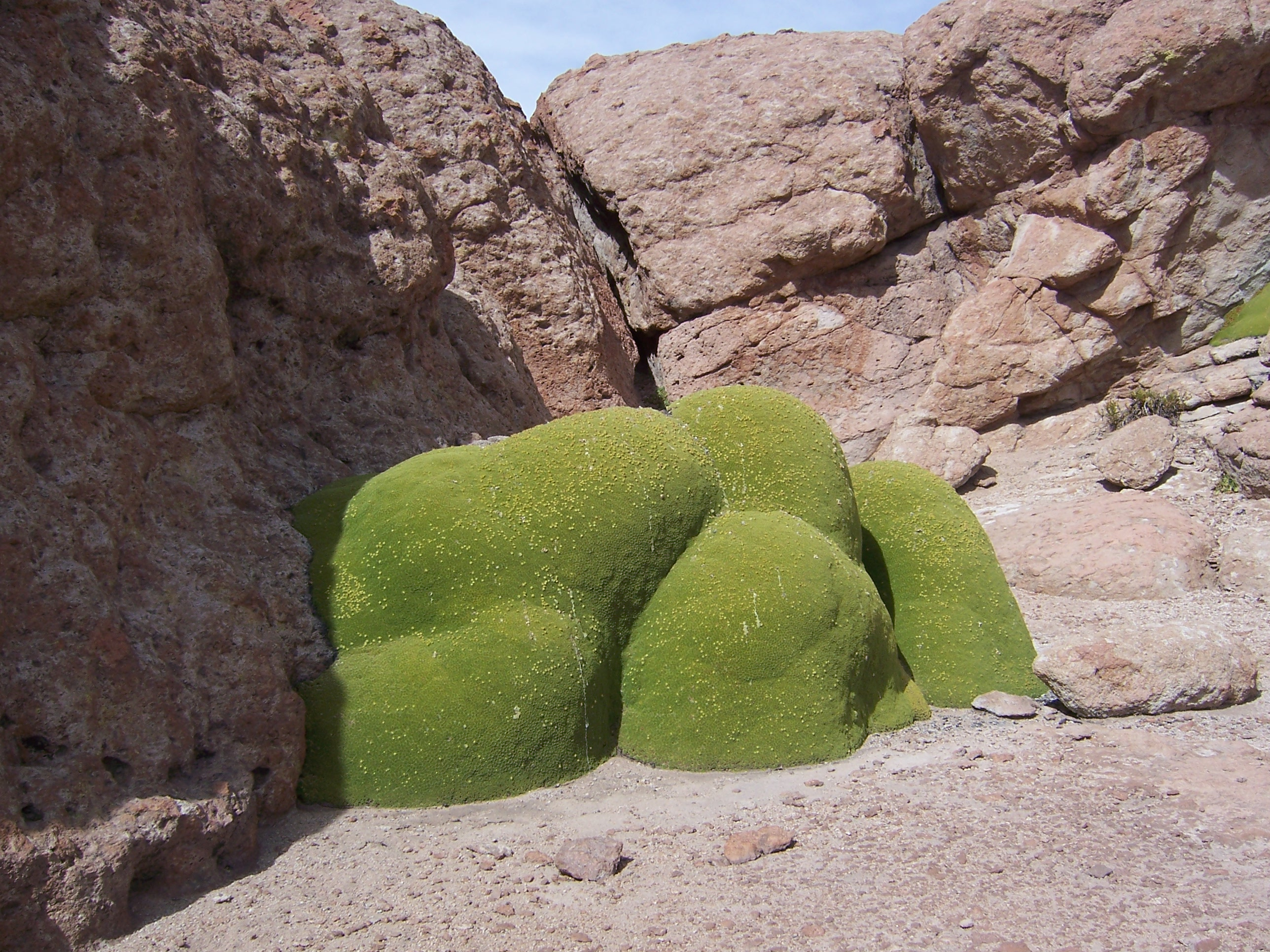
A yareta growing between rocks

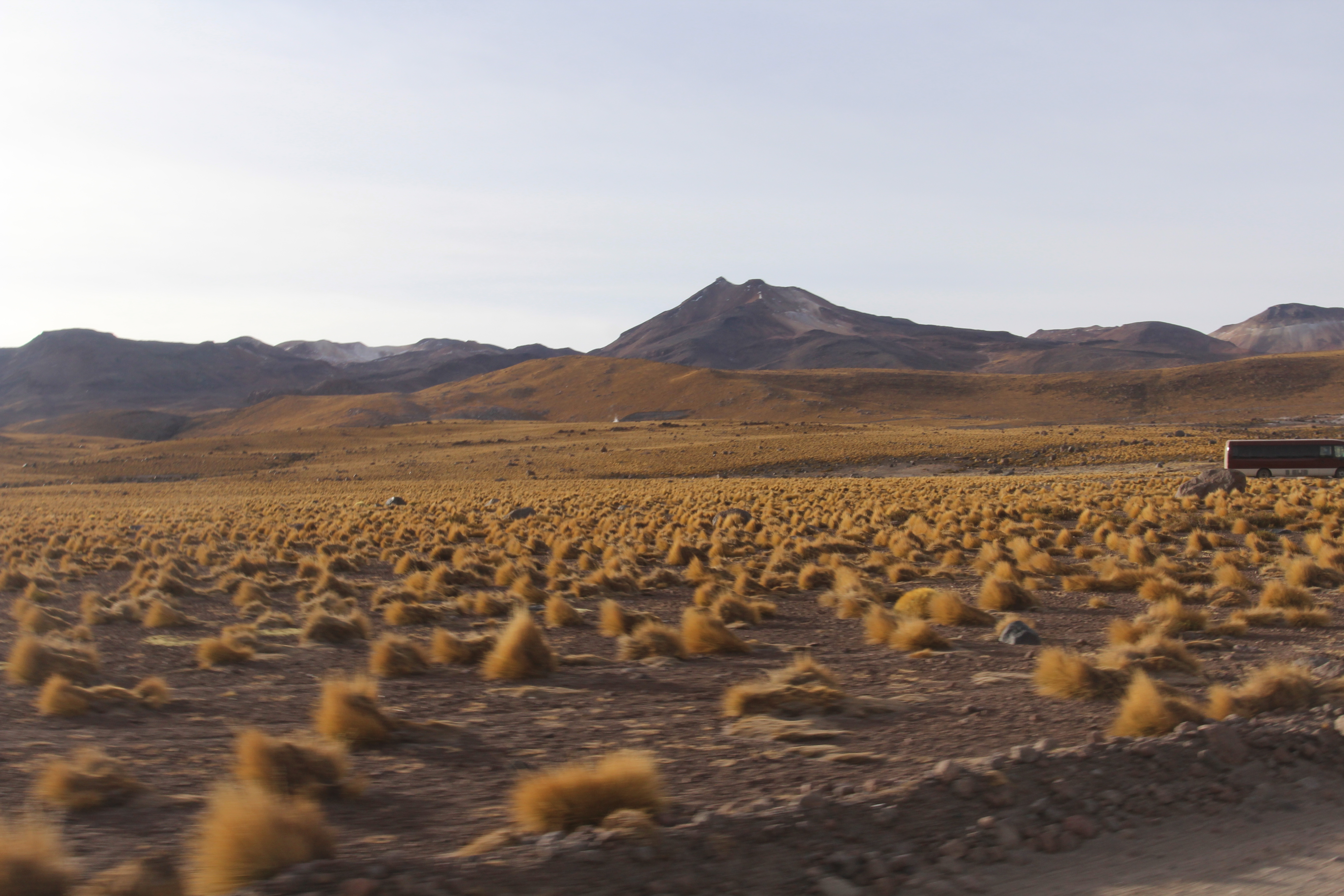
Landscape of the El Tatio region

=== Spring biology ===
The geothermal field El Tatio is populated by various plants, microbes and animals. The vents are an extreme environment, given the presence of arsenic, the large amount of UV radiation that El Tatio receives and its high elevation.

Hot springs have characteristic microbial communities associated with them that leave characteristic fossil traces in the spring deposits; environmental conditions on the early Earth resembled these of hot springs with potentially high UV radiation exposure, as the ozone layer did not yet exist and life probably developed within such conditions. In addition, microbial metabolism of arsenic influences its toxicity and the effects of arsenic pollution.

==== Microorganisms ====
Biofilms and microbial mats are omnipresent at El Tatio, including Arthrospira, Calothrix, Fischerella, Leptolyngbya, Lyngbya and Phormidium (Note: Phormidium is not strictly speaking a genus; it is defined by the morphology of the bacterial colonies and their silicified fossils. Phormidium mats are found in other geothermal areas around the world and additionally on wet soil.) cyanobacteria, which form mats within the hot springs covering the solid surfaces, including oncoids and the sinter. In other places, the aforementioned three genera form stromatolithic structures or floating rafts of bubbly mats. The mats have tufted, layered and conical textures and their colours include orange and olive green; they give the channels and pools their colour. Additional cyanobacteria genera reported from El Tatio are Chroococcidiopsis, Chlorogloeocystis, Chroogloeopsis, Fischerella, Synechococcus and Thermosynechococcus. Non-cyanobacteria bacteria have also been found in the mats and sinter; they include heterotrophic bacteria such as Isosphaera pallida. In total, at least 75 different species have been identified.

There is a thermal gradation of microorganisms, with the hottest waters supporting Chloroflexus green bacteria and hyperthermophiles, cyanobacteria at less than 70–73 °C (158–163 °F) water temperature and diatoms at even lower temperatures. Microbial mats have been found at other hot springs in the world such as Yellowstone and Steamboat Springs, both in the United States, and New Zealand, but they are thinner at El Tatio.

These mats often have their organic material replaced with opal and thus end up forming much of the sinter, which has thus characteristic biogenic textures, such as filaments and laminae. Such biogenic textures have been observed on sinter deposits around the world and are usually microbial in origin, at El Tatio they sometimes feature still living bacteria which can get entombed and preserved within the sinter deposits. In the case of El Tatio, these biogenic textures are particularly well preserved in the sinter deposited by water flowing away from springs. Chloroflexus is a thermophilic filamentous green bacterium found in hot waters at Yellowstone; filamentous structures within geyser cones at El Tatio may have been formed by this bacterium. In splash cones Synechococcus-like microbes are instead responsible for the structures, which resemble those of hot springs. Sinter absorbs much of UV radiation, protecting microorganisms that dwell within the sinter against this harmful radiation although it also absorbs light required for photosynthesis.

Diatoms are also found in El Tatio waters, including Synedra species, which are often found attached to filamentous substrates, and algae are found in the waters. Among bacteria identified in the somewhat colder flowing waters are Bacteroidota and Pseudomonadota, with Thermus species in the hot waters. Various archaeans have been cultured from El Tatio waters, with hot springs producing Thermoproteota (formerly crenarchaea), desulfurococcales, and methanobacteriales. One species, Methanogenium tatii, has been discovered at El Tatio, and is a methanogen recovered from a warm pool. The species name is derived from the geothermal field and other methanogens may be active in El Tatio. At least one bacteriophage (bacterial or archaean virus) species has been identified at El Tatio.

==== Macroorganisms ====
In the upper geyser basin, vegetation has been observed to grow within thermal areas, like a thermal marsh, where temperatures have decreased to 25–30 °C (77–86 °F). A wetland, known as Vega Rinconada, with hydrothermal vents lies west of the upper geyser basin. Animal species found at El Tatio include the snail Heleobia, the frog Rhinella spinulosa, a Neoephydra fly, and water mites. The larvae of this frog at El Tatio live in water with approximately constant temperatures of 25 °C (77 °F) and show atypical development patterns compared to frogs of the same species that developed in places with more variable water temperatures. Liolaemus lizard species have been recovered from the geyser area.

==== Analogies to Mars ====
The climate, environment and hydrothermal activity at El Tatio has been used as analogues for processes that took place on early Mars. Some microstructures found in the Columbia Hills at the Home Plate landform are similar to these biogenic structures at El Tatio, but do not necessarily imply that the microstructures on Mars are biogenic.

== Geological history ==
During the Pliocene–Quaternary the Cordillera Occidental was subject to extensional tectonics. A related fault system was active; it is linked to Sol de Mañana in Bolivia and controls the position of several vents in El Tatio. The intersection between northwest–southeast trending, north-northwest-south-southeast-trending lineaments at El Tatio has been correlated with the occurrence of geothermal activity. The tectonics of the El Tatio area were originally interpreted as reflecting the existence of a graben before a compressive tectonic regime was identified.

A series of ignimbrites was emplaced. The first was the 10.5–9.3 million year old (Note: Originally it was considered to be 9.56 ± 0.48 million years old, but later it was split into a 10.5 and a 9.3 million year old ignimbrite.) Rio Salado ignimbrite, which forms a 1,800-metre (5,900 ft) thick layer; this might imply that the source of this ignimbrite was close to El Tatio. The Rio Salado ignimbrite elsewhere crops out as two flow units, with varying colours, and close to El Tatio it is crystalline and densely welded. It was followed by the 8.3 million year old voluminous Sifon ignimbrite, which reaches a thickness of about 300 metres (980 ft) in the area. The Pliocene Puripicar ignimbrite reaches a similar thickness, and it was later downwarped by faulting.

This strong ignimbrite volcanism is associated with activity of the Altiplano–Puna volcanic complex, which has produced large volume dacite ignimbrites and sizable calderas, starting from the middle Miocene. Among these, Cerro Guacha, La Pacana, Pastos Grandes and Vilama produced supereruptions.

The Tatio ignimbrite was emplaced 710,000 ± 10,000 years ago and overlies several of the Tatio volcanoes, while the Tucle volcanics are dated to 800,000 ± 100,000 years ago. The ignimbrite reaches a volume of 40 cubic kilometres (9.6 cu mi) and crops out over a surface area of 830 square kilometres (320 sq mi). The Tatio ignimbrite contains rhyolitic pumice and crystals, while the Tucle volcanics are andesitic and include both lava and tuffs. The El Tatio ignimbrite ponded in the El Tatio area and may have originated at the Tocorpuri rhyolite dome, which is less than one million years old, in a vent now buried beneath the El Tatio volcanic group, or at the Laguna Colorada caldera.

The El Tatio volcanic group has likewise been dated to be less than one million years old, and its lavas overlie the older formations. Volcan Tatio erupted mafic (Note: A volcanic rock relatively rich in iron and magnesium, relative to silicon.) lavas probably during the Holocene; later this volcano was reinterpreted to be of Pleistocene age. Petrological data suggest that over time the erupted lavas of the El Tatio volcanic group have become more mafic, with older products being andesitic and later ones basaltic-andesitic.

There is no recorded historical volcanism (Note: Although post-glacial faulting may have taken place.) in the El Tatio area, with sinter deposition undisturbed by eruptions for the past 27,000 years - the youngest volcanic events in the area appear to be either 118,000 or 34,000 years old. Based on the rates of sinter precipitation and the thickness of the sinter deposits, it has been estimated that the sinters at El Tatio started to form between 4,000 and 1,500 years ago; these age estimates were not based on direct dating of the deposits, however, and older sinter deposits extend past the present-day geothermal field. Later, radiocarbon dating of the sinter deposits found that their deposition began after the end of the last ice age, an observation endorsed by the presence of glacial deposits beneath the sinter and radiometric dating of the deposits; however, traces of earlier activity may have been removed by glacial erosion. This may reflect a direct influence of glaciers or of post-glaciation events like the Lake Tauca wet period on geothermal activity. Research published in 2020 suggests that the geothermal activity commenced in the southern part of the field about 27,000–20,000 years ago and spread northwards, reaching the western part of the field less than 4,900 years ago. Secular variations in the deposition rate have been found, with an increase noted in the last 2,000 years.

== Geothermal exploitation ==
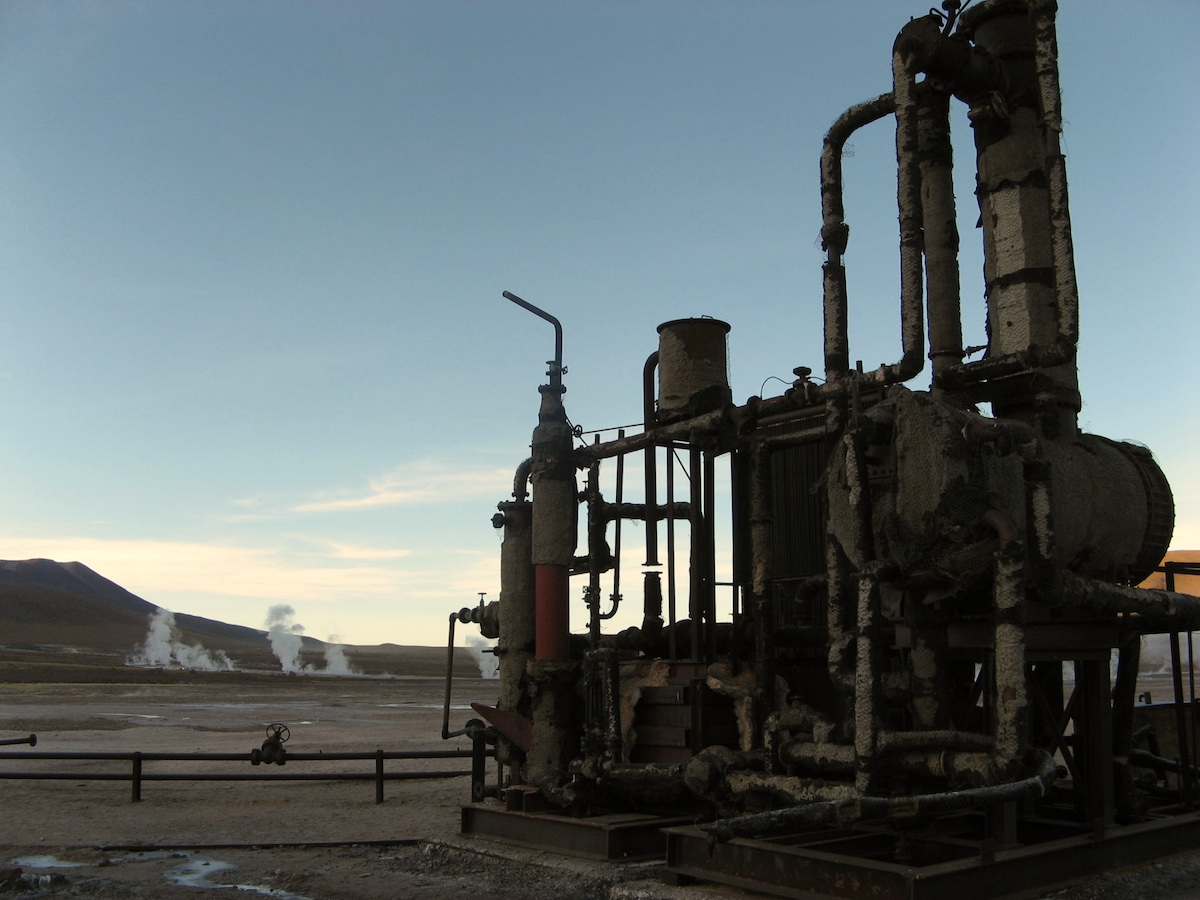
Technical equipment at El Tatio

Geothermal energy comes from the internal heat of the Earth, where the heat flow is sufficiently high that it can be used for heating and for the generation of electrical power. In Chile, various legal and economic hurdles have so far prevented substantial development of geothermal energy.

The earliest references to geothermal power at El Tatio go back to the beginning of the 20th century, when a private society "Comunidad de El Tatio" was founded by Italians in Antofagasta and employed Italian engineers from Larderello, who probed the field in 1921 and 1922. Technical and economic problems prevented further progress at that time. Later feasibility studies in northern Chile identified El Tatio as a potential site for geothermal power generation, and large-scale prospecting took place in the 1960s and 1970s. Wells were drilled in 1973 and 1974, and it was estimated that if the geothermal resources were fully exploited, about 100–400 megawatts of electric power could be produced, but the 1973 Chilean coup d'etat derailed further exploration efforts. Also in 1974 a desalination facility was built at El Tatio and could still be seen there in 2003; a thermal desalination process was developed at El Tatio that produced fresh water while also saving the remaining brine to extract valuable minerals. The drilling substantially altered the behaviour of the hot springs; already in November 1995, reports indicated that a number of geysers had disappeared or become hot springs and fumaroles.

El Tatio is remote, and this along with economic difficulties eventually led to the abandonment of the efforts at power generation; a bidding process for exploration rights in 1978 to attract private companies to El Tatio was interrupted by government changes and until 2000 geothermal development programs were paralyzed.

More recently in the 2000s several companies expressed interest in restarting geothermal power projects at El Tatio. A dispute over the gas supply from Argentina to Northern Chile in 2005 helped push the project forward, and after an environmental impact review in 2007 the Chilean government in 2008 granted a concession to develop geothermal resources in the field, with the expected yield being about 100-40 megawatt. (Note: According to the manager of the Chilean geothermal company, enough to power 130,000 homes and to save on 240,000 tons of carbon dioxide emission every year.) The first drilling permits were issued for the Quebrada de Zoquete area 4 kilometres (2.5 mi) away from the main field.

=== Controversy ===
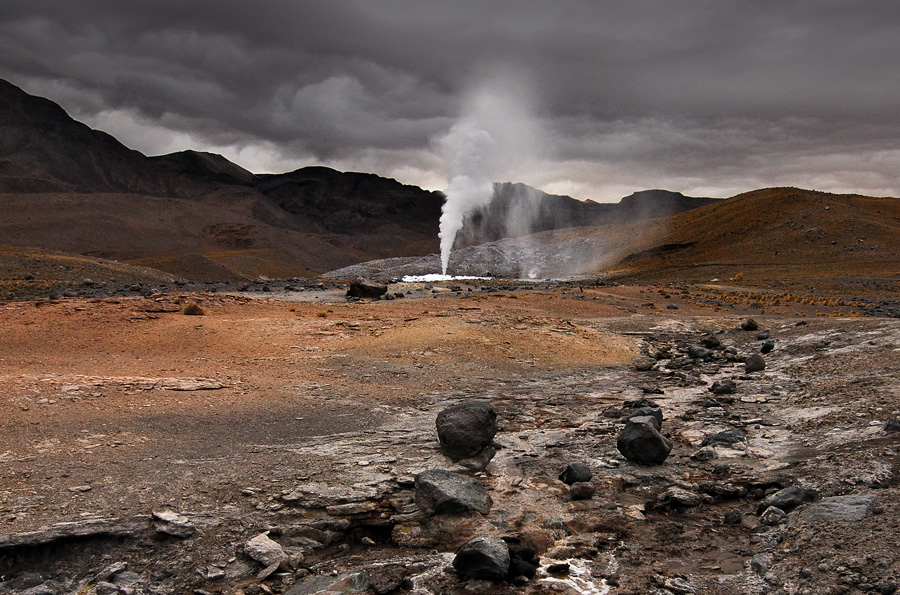
Steam venting created by the geothermal well blowout

On 8 September 2009, an older well in El Tatio that was being reused blew out, generating a 60-metre (200 ft) high steam fountain that was not plugged until 4 October. The operator of the geothermal project restricted access to the blow-out vent and stated through the technical manager of the El Tatio geothermal project that the blowout was neither a threat to the springs nor to tourists visiting El Tatio, and the Empresa Nacional de Geotermia company that operates it denied any responsibility for the incident.

The project had earlier been opposed by the local Atacameño population, owing to concerns about environmental damage and the religious importance of water and El Tatio in the region. Before the incident, an issue of the English-language newspaper The Economist had called attention to the adverse consequences of geothermal power extraction; the incident triggered a major controversy over geothermal power, with ramifications beyond Chile. The controversy gained widespread national and international attention, leading to the Chilean government shutting down geothermal exploration at El Tatio and drawing attention to the drawbacks of geothermal power generation. There were public demonstrations against the project, such as the march of two women to the capital Santiago to defend the geothermal field. The environmental authorities of Antofagasta subsequently suspended the El Tatio geothermal project, and the Geotérmica del Norte (Note: A daughter firm of Empresa Nacional de Geotermia.) company responsible for the project received strong criticism and was targeted by legal action. Both the Ministers of Mining and Energy cautioned against stigmatizing geothermal energy, however, and some local authorities disagreed with the rejection. The director of the National Geology and Mining Service (SERNAGEOMIN) stated that the company had no plans to handle such a situation. The Geotérmica del Norte company was fined 100 UTM (Note: The UTM continually adjusts fines according to inflation. In 2011, 100 UTM was about US$4 million.) (a Chilean unit of account for fines and sanctions) for violating mitigation plans, a fine upheld in 2011 by the Court of Appeals in Santiago. Legal cases related to the Tatio field went as far as the Inter-American Court of Human Rights.

Industry-community disputes have occurred before in northern Chile, typically tied to conflicts about the use of water, (Note: The region is arid and economic growth driven by increased mining has increased the consumption of the scarce water resources in the region, driving conflict between various entities.) which was in large part privatized during the Pinochet era; during the Tatio controversy, power generation and relations between the Chilean government and native communities also gained prominence among the disputed issues. An important factor in the Tatio controversy is the role of the tourism industry, which viewed the geothermal project as a threat; this kind of industry-industry conflict was unusual. Geothermal projects in New Zealand and the United States have resulted in the extinction of geysers. While the incident ultimately did not result in lasting changes to the El Tatio geysers, the widespread media attention did create adverse publicity and social opposition - in particular among indigenous leaders in the region - against geothermal energy in Chile.

== Tourism ==
El Tatio is a tourism destination, with substantial numbers of travelers both from Chile and other countries. This tourism is an important economic resource for the region, and the site is administered by the local Atacameño population as part of a wider trend of cooperations between native communities and heritage sites in the region. About 100,000 tourists visit El Tatio every year. In 2009, there were more than 400 daily visitors of the geysers, about 90 percent of all tourism of San Pedro de Atacama from where El Tatio can be reached. Aside from viewing the geysers, bathing in the hot water, watching the natural scenery and visiting surrounding Atacameño villages with their adobe buildings are other activities possible at El Tatio. Environmental impacts such as pollution and vandalism of geothermal landforms have been documented.

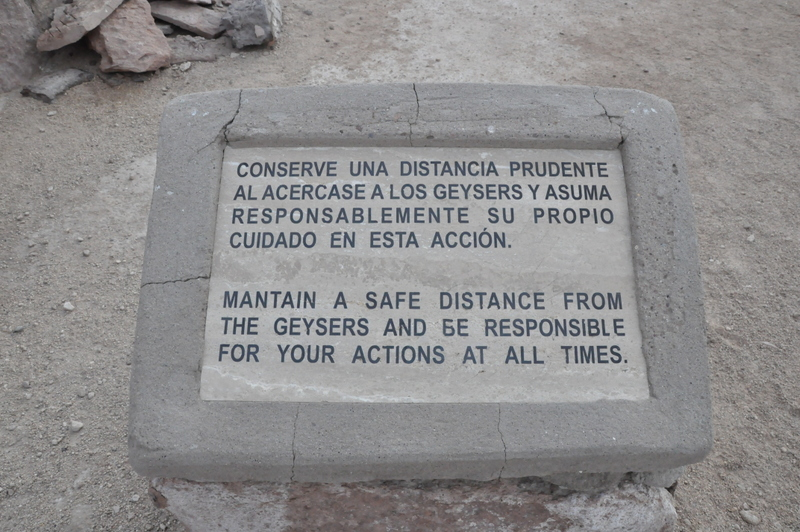
Safety warning sign

El Tatio displays some typical hazards of geothermal areas. Exposure to the hot gases and water can result in burn injuries, and both sudden eruptions of geysers and fountains and fragile ground above vents and above boiling water, concealed beneath thin covers of solid ground, increase the risk to unwary travelers. The site lies at high altitude, frequently leading to altitude sickness, and the cold dry climate creates further danger. The Chilean government recommends that tourists take warm clothing, sunscreen and mineral water.

The indigenous communities of Toconce and Caspana administer the geysers. In 2002, El Tatio was declared part of a "zone of touristic interest"; a classification which implies that local institutions ought to develop an action plan to induce the development of tourism. In 2009, José Antonio Gómez Urrutia, then-senator of Chile for the Antofagasta region proposed that El Tatio be declared a natural sanctuary (a type of protected area); the corresponding parliamentary motion was approved in the same year. In 2010, the El Tatio area was declared to be a protected area, with a surface area of 200 square kilometres (20,000 ha). It was not clear at that time what the exact status would be, with the regional Secretary of Agriculture proposing that it should become a national park. In 2022, the International Union of Geological Sciences listed it among its 100 heritage sites.

== See also ==
- List of hot springs
- Linzor, a volcano farther north
- Cerro del León, another volcano farther north
- Apacheta-Aguilucho volcanic complex
