= Cerro Chanka =

Volcano in Chile

Coordinates: 21°47′09″S 68°18′37″W

Cerro Chanka (also known as Chanka or Pabellon) is a Pleistocene lava dome in the Andes. It is part of the Altiplano-Puna volcanic complex. Potassium-argon dating indicates that the dome last erupted 119.8±5.4 ka ago. Another reported age is 1.5±0.1 mya.

The dome is located on the northwestern side of Cerro del Azufre. It is constructed from three lobes with diameters of 1.5 kilometres (0.93 mi). The flanks of the dome are steep and talus and lava blocks lie at its feet.

Cerro Chanka has a SiO_{2} content of 66% and is of calc-alkaline origin. The lavas are potassium-rich dacitic and rhyolitic save for an andesitic mafic component, and rich in crystals.

== See also ==
- Cerro Chao
- Cerro Chascon-Runtu Jarita complex
- Tocorpuri
