= Chillahuita =

Dacitic lava dome in northern Chile

- Location within Chile

Highest point
- Elevation: 4,706 m (15,440 ft)
- Coordinates: 22°10′10″S 68°2′30″W

Geography
- Location: Antofagasta Region, Chile
- Parent range: Andes

Geology
- Mountain type: Lava dome

Chillahuita is a dacitic lava dome in northern Chile. It may have formed after the Pleistocene, although argon-argon dating on amphibole has indicated an age of 370,000 ± 40,000 years; another age estimate is 107,800 ± 6,400 years. It has an altitude of about 4,750 metres (15,580 ft). It formed in a single non-explosive eruption.

The flow moved northward and eastward from the vent over a terrain with slopes of 3-4°. The flow has a surface area of 11 square kilometres (4.2 sq mi) with a flat circular surface containing flow folds. Steep 200-metre (660 ft) high flanks limit the flow, which has a total volume of 4 cubic kilometres (0.96 cu mi). It is surrounded by a pumice deposit probably from the San Pedro volcano to the northwest.

The eruption of the Chillahuita dome involved the entry of andesitic magma into a pre-existent shallow reservoir. It appears to have been controlled by local fault systems associated with the Altiplano-Puna volcanic complex, which also has geochemical similarity with Chillahuita lavas.

== See also ==
- Cerro Chao
- Cerro Chascon-Runtu Jarita complex
