= Pastos Grandes =

Caldera and its crater lake in Bolivia

Coordinates: 21°45′S 67°50′W

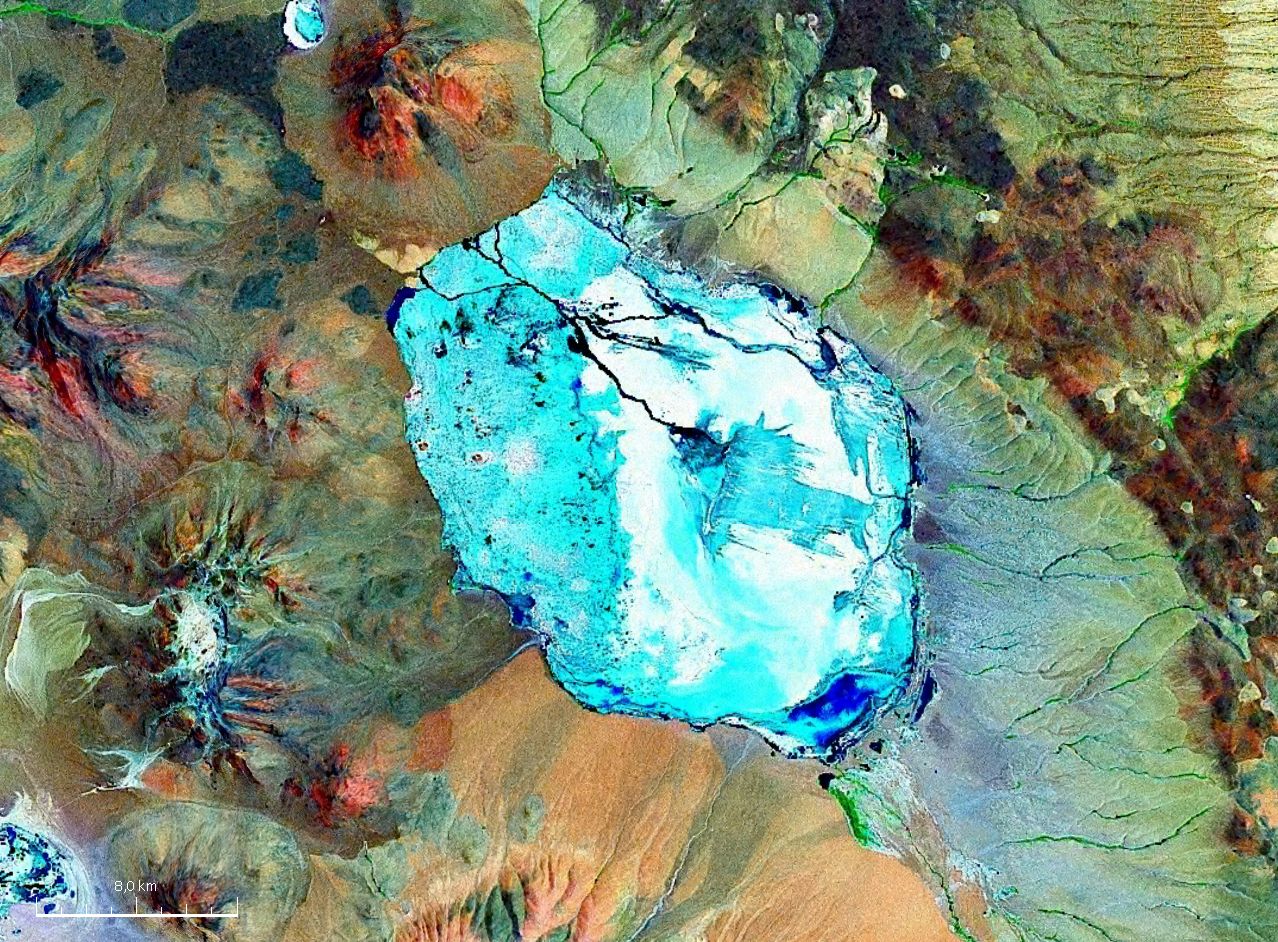
Satellite image of the Pastos Grandes lake basin

Pastos Grandes is the name of a caldera and its crater lake in Bolivia. The caldera is part of the Altiplano-Puna volcanic complex, a large ignimbrite province that is part of the Central Volcanic Zone of the Andes. Pastos Grandes has erupted a number of ignimbrites through its history, some of which exceeded a volume of 1,000 cubic kilometres (240 cu mi). After the ignimbrite phase, the lava domes of the Cerro Chascon-Runtu Jarita complex were erupted close to the caldera and along faults.

The caldera is the site of a few lakes, some of which are fed by hot springs. A number of minerals, including lithium, are dissolved in the lakes.

== Location ==
Pastos Grandes lies in the Sud Lipez Region of Bolivia. Geographically the area is part of the Altiplano, a high plateau bordered by the Cordillera Occidental and the Cordillera Oriental. The Altiplano contains two large salt pans, the Salar de Uyuni and Salar de Coipasa. The specific area of Pastos Grandes is remote and poorly accessible, the existence of the caldera was first established by satellite imagery.

== Geology ==
=== Regional ===
The region has been heavily affected by volcanism, including large ignimbrites and stratovolcanoes extending into Chile. Volcanic rocks include andesite, dacite and rhyodacite with the former dominating in the Chilean stratovolcanoes and the latter in the ignimbrites. The dry regional climate means that there is little erosion and that volcanic centres are well conserved. The surface covered by volcanic rocks amounts to about 300,000 square kilometres (120,000 sq mi).

Volcanic activity in the region is the consequence of the subduction of the Nazca Plate beneath the South American Plate in the Peru-Chile Trench. This process has formed three main volcanic zones at the Andes, the Northern Volcanic Zone, the Central Volcanic Zone and the Southern Volcanic Zone. Pastos Grandes is part of the Central Volcanic Zone along with about 50 volcanoes with recent activity and other ignimbrite generating volcanic centres. This ignimbritic volcanism began in the late Miocene and formed a large field known as the Altiplano-Puna volcanic complex, a large volcanic province which clusters around the tripoint between Argentina, Bolivia and Chile.

=== Local ===
Pastos Grandes is a nested caldera which underwent repeated collapse in the past, most likely along defined sectors of its rim. It has been subdivided into two calderas, a larger Chuhuila caldera and the 40 by 25 kilometres (25 mi × 16 mi) smaller Pastos Grandes caldera. The caldera is about 35 by 40 kilometres (22 mi × 25 mi) wide and had a maximum depth of 400 metres (1,300 ft). Cerro Pastos Grandes is 5,802 metres (19,035 ft) high and shows traces of a sector collapse. It might be a 500–1,200 metres (1,600–3,900 ft) high resurgent dome and is flanked by lava domes on the north-northwestern, southwestern and southeastern side. The activity of Pastos Grandes may be associated with the ongoing development of a pluton underneath the caldera. Major regional faults running through the region have influenced the shape of the calderas, giving them an elliptic shape which is also evident at Pastos Grandes.

Pastos Grandes has erupted calc-alkaline rocks which define a dacite suite. Eruption products of Pastos Grandes are rich in potassium. Minerals encountered in the rock include amphibole, biotite, plagioclase, quartz and sanidine. The magmas underwent slow evolution in the 1,000,000 years preceding each eruption. Plutonic rocks linked to Pastos Grandes were erupted from the Chascon-Runtu Jarita vents 94,000 - 85,000 years ago.

=== Eruption history ===
Three large ignimbrite-forming eruptions occurred at Pastos Grandes during its history. At first, it was assumed that large eruptions first occurred 8.1 million years ago, a second 5.6 million years and a third 2.3 million years ago. However, it is not clear which of any eruption formed the caldera. A number of ignimbrites has been attributed to Pastos Grandes, some of them may be different names for the same ignimbrite:

- The 8.33 ± 0.15 million years old Sifon ignimbrite has a volume of over 1,000 cubic kilometres (240 cu mi), but it is not certain that Pastos Grandes was actually the source.
- The 6.2 ± 0.7 million years old Pastos Grandes I or Chuhuhuilla ignimbrite has with a volume of over 1,000 cubic kilometres (240 cu mi).
- The 3.3 ± 0.4 million years old Pastos Grandes II/Juvina ignimbrite has a volume of 50–100 cubic kilometres (12–24 cu mi) from the Juvina centre.
- The 5.45 ± 0.02 million years old Chuhuilla ignimbrite with a volume of 1,200 cubic kilometres (290 cu mi) and was responsible for the first caldera-forming cycle.
- The 2.89 ± 0.01 million years old Pastos Grandes ignimbrite that has a volume of 1,500 cubic kilometres (360 cu mi) and is part of the second caldera-forming cycle.

The 6.1 million years old Carcote ignimbrite may also have originated here. The 5.22 ± 0.02 million years old Alota ignimbrite was also attributed to Pastos Grandes, although it originated in a centre northeast of the Pastos Grandes caldera known as Cerro Juvina. These ignimbrites crop out on the outside of the Pastos Grandes caldera, where they extend to distances of 50 kilometres (31 mi), but also cover parts of the caldera. Given the volumes involved, at least some of the eruptions are classified as 8 on the volcanic explosivity index.

Pastos Grandes was volcanically active for a long time, more than many other Altiplano-Puna volcanic complex centres. Later more recent volcanic centres formed within the caldera, the youngest of these centres are relatively recent Such recent centres close to Pastos Grandes are Cerro Chao and Cerro Chascon-Runtu Jarita complex. The former of which lies on a lineament that appears to coincide with the caldera rim of Pastos Grandes, and the latter seems to rise from the ring fault of Pastos Grandes. but is apparently unrelated to the caldera. Cerro Chascon-Runtu Jarita is less than 100,000 years old according to argon-argon dating. This and ongoing geothermal manifestations suggest that volcanic activity may still occur at Pastos Grandes. Finally, Pastos Grandes and Cerro Guacha may be the heat source for the El Tatio geothermal field west of Pastos Grandes.

== Lake ==
At an elevation of 4,430 metres (14,530 ft), Pastos Grandes contains a lake basin north of Cerro Pastos Grandes, which is 10 kilometres (6.2 mi) wide and covers a surface area of about 100 square kilometres (39 sq mi)-120 square kilometres (46 sq mi) at an elevation of 4,400 metres (14,400 ft). It only covers a fraction of the area of Pastos Grandes caldera and is probably a remnant of a once-larger lake that filled the moat of the caldera. Earlier lacustrine episodes left a layer of beige mud behind. This mud freezes during the winter months to a certain depth and cryoturbation has formed polygonal structures as well as large cracks in the crust on its surface.

Surfaces of open water are concentrated on the eastern edge of the salt pan, in its very centre and isolated areas on the western side, these all form an intricated network of interconnected ponds especially in the western half of the salt pan. One of these open water surfaces on the western side of the lake basin is known as Laguna Caliente, while another square-shaped lake in the southern part of the caldera is known as Laguna Khara. Sometimes after heavy precipitation, these open water surfaces can join into a ring lake around the centre.

Intermittent streams drain the catchment of Pastos Grandes and reach the salt pan; the longest flow through the southeastern parts of the catchment. The entire drainage basin of the lake has a surface area of 655 square kilometres (253 sq mi)-660 square kilometres (250 sq mi) and is delimited to the west and east by rhyolitic ridges. Apart from surface streams, springs contribute to the water budget of Pastos Grandes. Hot springs are active or were recently active on the western side of the salt pan and bear names such as La Salsa, La Rumba and El Ojo Verde, where temperatures of 20–75 °C (68–167 °F) have been measured. On the western shore, colder springs predominate. The heat appears to originate from a 200–250 °C (392–482 °F) hot reservoir.

Salts found within the salt pan include gypsum, halite and ulexite. The brines are rich in boron, lithium and sodium chloride, the salt pan has been considered a potential site for lithium and potassium mining. Salt contents range 144–371 grams per litre (0.0052–0.0134 lb/cu in). The salt chemistry is strongly influenced by the climate; the precipitation of mirabilite due to cold and evaporation of water cause changes in the composition of the waters.

Unique among most other salars of the Andes, Pastos Grandes features a c. 40 square kilometres (15 sq mi) carbonate platform with numerous fabrics of carbonate deposition. It is unclear what drives its formation as the climate at Pastos Grandes is similar to that of other salt lakes without such platforms but it may be a consequence of carbon dioxide degassing under the salar. At numerous points, calcite pisoliths are found at Pastos Grandes, usually associated with active or former springs. Rimstone dams and sinter terraces are also encountered close to inactive springs. All these cave formations encountered at Pastos Grandes are caused by the precipitation of calcite from oversaturated waters at the surface. What drives the loss of carbon dioxide and thus the oversaturation is not clear but may involve photosynthesis by algae.

Algae and diatoms grow within the open waters in Pastos Grandes, the diatoms being represented by oligohaline species such as some Fragilaria and Navicularia species. Different water surfaces are dominated by different diatom species, distinctions that are only partly mediated by different salinities. Animal species found within the lakes include amphipods, elmids and leeches in freshwater and by Cricotopus in saltwater. Additional animals are Euplanaria dorotocephala, Chironomidae, Corixidae, Cyclopoida, Ephydridae, Harpacticoida, Orchestidae, Ostracoda and Tipulidae species. Similar but different animal species have been found in other local lakes, indicating that they are largely separate systems. The animal flora of such Altiplano lakes is not very diverse, probably due to their relative youth and the harsh and often highly variable climates of the past in the region.

Pastos Grandes is one of many endorheic lakes that cover the region. The neighbouring Altiplano was formerly covered by lakes as well during the Pleistocene. After they dried up, the Salar de Uyuni and Salar de Coipasa were left behind.

== Climate ==
The area of Pastos Grandes has a summer wet climate, with most of the precipitation falling during a wet season in December–March. An estimate for the total precipitation is about 200 millimetres per year (7.9 in/year). That is, the climate is arid and evaporation rates can reach about 1,400 millimetres per year (55 in/year). Insolation is high and the temperatures can vary by as much as 15 °C (27 °F). During winter, they can drop as far as −25 °C (−13 °F).

== Human exploitation ==
The lithium deposits have drawn attention of mining interests, with the Bolivian government seeking businesses to exploit the lithium deposits at Pastos Grandes, Uyuni and Coipasa.
