= Texas A&M University College of Science =

College of Science
- Established: 1924; 102 years ago School of Arts and Sciences; 1966; 60 years ago College of Science
- Parent institution: Texas A&M University
- Location: 30.613181°N 96.339878°W
- Defunct: 2022 (Merged with College of Geosciences and College of Liberal Arts to form the Texas A&M University College of Arts and Sciences
- Website: www.science.tamu.edu

The Texas A&M University College of Science was an academic science college of Texas A&M University in College Station. It was founded in 1924. The faculty included a Nobel laureate and three National Academy of Sciences members. The college was dissolved in 2022, two years before what would have been its 100th year in existence.

The Department of Mathematics was one of only five nationwide that had both Vertical Integration of Research and Education in the Mathematical Sciences (VIGRE) and Research Experiences for Undergraduates (REU) National Science Foundation grants. The Physics Department was one of eight partners in the $500 million Giant Magellan Telescope.

In 2022, the College of Science merged with the College of Liberal Arts and the College of Geosciences, along with a few other programs, to form the College of Arts & Sciences.

== History ==
When Texas A&M was founded as a land-grant agricultural college in 1876, the school consisted of only two faculty, one of whom taught agricultural chemistry and scientific agriculture. The Texas State Legislature had mandated that science and mathematics existed only to supply instruction to applied fields, and pure scientific study or research was not encouraged. It was not until 1924 that the college established a School of Arts and Sciences, which taught liberal arts, business administration, preparation for teaching, and science. Courses in chemistry and physics were offered in the School of Engineering.

Following World War II and the advent of the atomic bomb, more students clamored for training in pure and natural sciences versus applied science. In 1944 the college had established the Texas A&M Research Foundation, further encourage scientifically minded young people to attend A&M. Between 1948 and 1958 the proportion of students in the School of Arts and Sciences grew much more rapidly than those in the Schools of Agriculture and Engineering, and by 1957 comprised 25% of the student body.

Texas A&M was elevated to university status in 1963, and three years later the College of Science was born, offering the departments of biology, chemistry, mathematics, and physics. The Cyclotron Institute, which conducts research in the nuclear aspects of chemistry, physics, biology, and engineering was placed under the administration of the College of Science in 1971, and in 1984 the Institute of Statistics was renamed to the Department of Statistics. In 2009, the Department of Physics became the Department of Physics and Astronomy to reflect the membership in the Giant Magellan Telescope Project in 2004, and the inclusion of an Astronomy Program in 2006.

The Trotter Prize (Texas A&M) is an award and lecture series.

== Academics ==
=== Degrees offered ===
- Department of Biology
  - Biology (BA, BS, MS, Ph.D.)
  - Botany (BS, MS, Ph.D.)
  - Microbiology (BS, MS, Ph.D.)
  - Molecular & Cell Biology (BS)
  - Zoology (BS, MS, Ph.D.)
  - Neuroscience (BS, BA)
- Department of Chemistry
  - Chemistry (BA, BS, MS, Ph.D.)
- Department of Mathematics
  - Applied Mathematical Sciences (BS)
  - Mathematics (BA, BS, MS, Ph.D.)
- Department of Physics and Astronomy
  - Applied Physics (Ph.D.)
  - Physics (BA, BS, MS, Ph.D.)
  - Astrophysics (Ph.D.)
- Department of Statistics
  - Statistics (BS, MS, Ph.D.)

=== Centers ===
- Center for Approximation Theory
- Center for Biological Clocks Research
- Center for Chemical Characterization & Analysis
- Center for Mathematics & Science Education (CMSE)
- Information Technology in Science (ITS)
- Center for Teaching & Learning

=== Institutes ===
- Cyclotron Institute
- George P. and Cynthia W. Mitchell Institute for Fundamental Physics
- Institute of Developmental & Molecular Biology (IDMB)

=== Rankings ===
- The Texas A&M Department of Chemistry is ranked 21st nationally by U.S. News & World Report, and the department's Division of Inorganic Chemistry is ranked 7th.
