= Shield volcano =

Low-profile volcano usually formed almost entirely of fluid lava flows

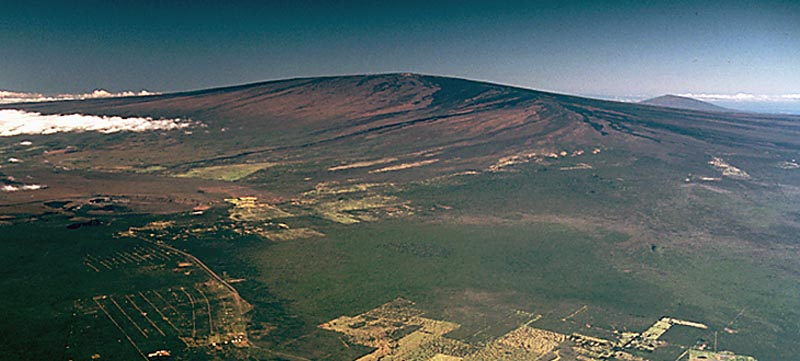
Mauna Loa, a shield volcano in Hawaii

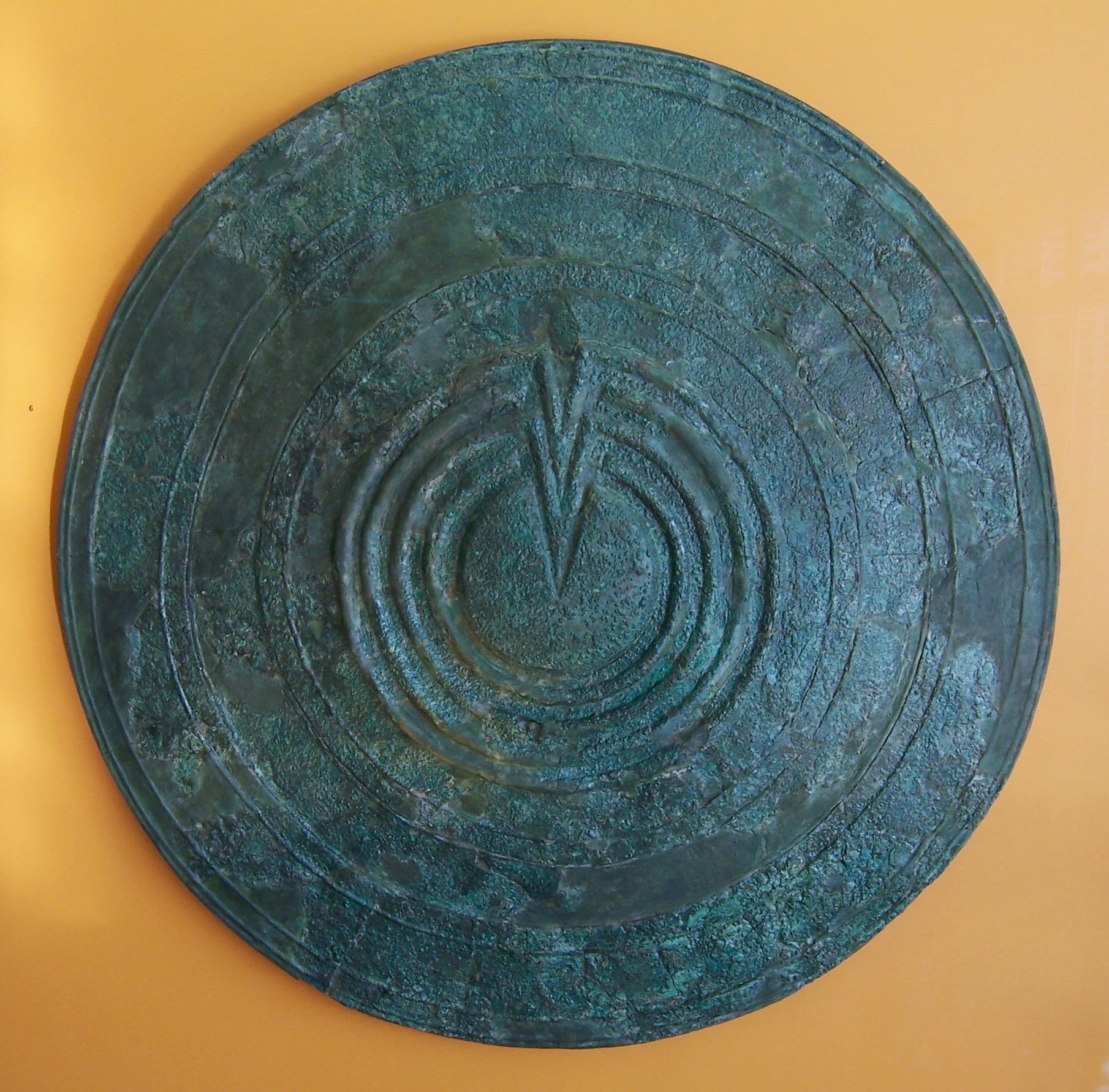
An Ancient Greek warrior's shield—its circular shape and gently sloping surface, with a central raised area, is a shape shared by many shield volcanoes

A shield volcano is a type of volcano named for its low profile, resembling a shield lying on the ground. It is formed by the eruption of highly fluid (low viscosity) lava, which travels farther and forms thinner flows than the more viscous lava erupted from a stratovolcano. Repeated eruptions result in the steady accumulation of broad sheets of lava, building up the shield volcano's distinctive form.

Shield volcanoes are found wherever fluid, low-silica lava reaches the surface of a rocky planet. However, they are most characteristic of ocean island volcanism associated with hot spots or with continental rift volcanism. They include the largest active volcanoes on Earth, such as Mauna Loa. Giant shield volcanoes are found on other planets of the Solar System, including Olympus Mons on Mars and Sapas Mons on Venus.

== Etymology ==
The term 'shield volcano' is taken from the German term Schildvulkan, coined by the Austrian geologist Eduard Suess in 1888 and which had been calqued into English by 1910.

== Geology ==
=== Structure ===
Shield volcanoes are distinguished from the three other major volcanic types—stratovolcanoes, lava domes, and cinder cones—by their structural form, a consequence of their particular magmatic composition. Of these four forms, shield volcanoes erupt the least viscous lavas. Whereas stratovolcanoes and lava domes are the product of highly viscous flows, and cinder cones are constructed of explosively eruptive tephra, shield volcanoes are the product of gentle effusive eruptions of highly fluid lavas that produce, over time, a broad, gently sloped eponymous "shield". Although the term is generally applied to basaltic shields, it has also at times been applied to rarer scutiform volcanoes of differing magmatic composition—principally pyroclastic shields, formed by the accumulation of fragmentary material from particularly powerful explosive eruptions, and rarer felsic lava shields formed by unusually fluid felsic magmas. Examples of pyroclastic shields include Billy Mitchell volcano in Papua New Guinea and the Purico complex in Chile; an example of a felsic shield is the Ilgachuz Range in British Columbia, Canada. Shield volcanoes are similar in origin to vast lava plateaus and flood basalts present in various parts of the world. These are eruptive features which occur along linear fissure vents and are distinguished from shield volcanoes by the lack of an identifiable primary eruptive center.

Diagram of the common structural features of a shield volcano

Active shield volcanoes experience near-continuous eruptive activity over extremely long periods of time, resulting in the gradual build-up of edifices that can reach extremely large dimensions. With the exclusion of flood basalts, mature shields are the largest volcanic features on Earth. The summit of the largest subaerial volcano in the world, Mauna Loa, lies 4,169 m (13,678 ft) above sea level, and the volcano, over 60 mi (100 km) wide at its base, is estimated to contain about 80,000 km^{3} (19,000 cu mi) of basalt. The mass of the volcano is so great that it has slumped the crust beneath it a further 8 km (5 mi). Accounting for this subsidence and for the height of the volcano above the sea floor, the "true" height of Mauna Loa from the start of its eruptive history is about 17,170 m (56,000 ft). Mount Everest, by comparison, is 8,848 m (29,029 ft) in height. In 2013, a team led by the University of Houston's William Sager announced the discovery of Tamu Massif, an enormous extinct submarine volcano, approximately 450 by 650 km (280 by 400 mi) in area, which dwarfs all previously known volcanoes on Earth. However, the extents of the volcano have not been confirmed. Although Tamu Massif was initially believed to be a shield volcano, Sanger and his colleagues acknowledged in 2019 that Tamu Massif is not a shield volcano.

Shield volcanoes feature a gentle (usually 2° to 3°) slope that gradually steepens with elevation (reaching approximately 10°) before flattening near the summit, forming an overall upwardly convex shape. These slope characteristics have a correlation with age of the forming lava, with in the case of the Hawaiian chain, steepness increasing with age, as later lavas tend to be more alkali so are more viscous, with thicker flows, that travel less distance from the summit vents. In height they are typically about one twentieth their width. Although the general form of a "typical" shield volcano varies little worldwide, there are regional differences in their size and morphological characteristics. Typical shield volcanoes found in California and Oregon measure 3 to 4 mi (5 to 6 km) in diameter and 1,500 to 2,000 ft (500 to 600 m) in height, while shield volcanoes in the central Mexican Michoacán–Guanajuato volcanic field average 340 m (1,100 ft) in height and 4,100 m (13,500 ft) in width, with an average slope angle of 9.4° and an average volume of 1.7 km^{3} (0.4 cu mi).

Rift zones are a prevalent feature on shield volcanoes that is rare on other volcanic types. The large, decentralized shape of Hawaiian volcanoes as compared to their smaller, symmetrical Icelandic cousins can be attributed to rift eruptions. Fissure venting is common in Hawaiʻi; most Hawaiian eruptions begin with a so-called "wall of fire" along a major fissure line before centralizing to a small number of points. This accounts for their asymmetrical shape, whereas Icelandic volcanoes follow a pattern of central eruptions dominated by summit calderas, causing the lava to be more evenly distributed or symmetrical.

=== Eruptive characteristics ===
Diagram of a Hawaiian eruption. (key: 1. Ash plume 2. Lava fountain 3. Crater 4. Lava lake 5. Fumaroles 6. Lava flow 7. Layers of lava and ash 8. Stratum 9. Sill 10. Magma conduit 11. Magma chamber 12. Dike) Click for larger version.

Most of what is currently known about shield volcanic eruptive character has been gleaned from studies done on the volcanoes of Hawaiʻi Island, by far the most intensively studied of all shields because of their scientific accessibility; the island lends its name to the slow-moving, effusive eruptions typical of shield volcanism, known as Hawaiian eruptions. These eruptions, the least explosive of volcanic events, are characterized by the effusive emission of highly fluid basaltic lavas with low gaseous content. These lavas travel a far greater distance than those of other eruptive types before solidifying, forming extremely wide but relatively thin magmatic sheets often less than 1 m (3 ft) thick. Low volumes of such lavas layered over long periods of time are what slowly constructs the characteristically low, broad profile of a mature shield volcano.

Also unlike other eruptive types, Hawaiian eruptions often occur at decentralized fissure vents, beginning with large "curtains of fire" that quickly die down and concentrate at specific locations on the volcano's rift zones. Central-vent eruptions, meanwhile, often take the form of large lava fountains (both continuous and sporadic), which can reach heights of hundreds of meters or more. The particles from lava fountains usually cool in the air before hitting the ground, resulting in the accumulation of cindery scoria fragments; however, when the air is especially thick with pyroclasts, they cannot cool off fast enough because of the surrounding heat, and hit the ground still hot, accumulating into spatter cones. If eruptive rates are high enough, they may even form splatter-fed lava flows. Hawaiian eruptions are often extremely long-lived; Puʻu ʻŌʻō, a cinder cone of Kīlauea, erupted continuously from January 3, 1983, until April 2018.

Flows from Hawaiian eruptions can be divided into two types by their structural characteristics: pāhoehoe lava which is relatively smooth and flows with a ropey texture, and ʻaʻā flows which are denser, more viscous (and thus slower moving) and blockier. These lava flows can be anywhere between 2 and 20 m (10 and 70 ft) thick. ʻAʻā lava flows move through pressure— the partially solidified front of the flow steepens because of the mass of flowing lava behind it until it breaks off, after which the general mass behind it moves forward. Though the top of the flow quickly cools down, the molten underbelly of the flow is buffered by the solidifying rock above it, and by this mechanism, ʻaʻā flows can sustain movement for long periods of time. Pāhoehoe flows, in contrast, move in more conventional sheets, or by the advancement of lava "toes" in snaking lava columns. Increasing viscosity on the part of the lava or shear stress on the part of local topography can morph a pāhoehoe flow into an ʻaʻā one, but the reverse never occurs.

Although most shield volcanoes are by volume almost entirely Hawaiian and basaltic in origin, they are rarely exclusively so. Some volcanoes, such as Mount Wrangell in Alaska and Cofre de Perote in Mexico, exhibit large enough swings in their historical magmatic eruptive characteristics to cast strict categorical assignment in doubt; one geological study of de Perote went so far as to suggest the term "compound shield-like volcano" instead. Most mature shield volcanoes have multiple cinder cones on their flanks, the results of tephra ejections common during incessant activity and markers of currently and formerly active sites on the volcano. An example of these parasitic cones is at Puʻu ʻŌʻō on Kīlauea—continuous activity ongoing since 1983 has built up a 2,290 ft (698 m) tall cone at the site of one of the longest-lasting rift eruptions in known history.

The Hawaiian shield volcanoes are not located near any plate boundaries; the volcanic activity of this island chain is distributed by the movement of the oceanic plate over an upwelling of magma known as a hotspot. Over millions of years, the tectonic movement that moves continents also creates long volcanic trails across the seafloor. The Hawaiian and Galápagos shields, and other hotspot shields like them, are constructed of oceanic island basalt. Their lavas are characterized by high levels of sodium, potassium, and aluminium.

Features common in shield volcanism include lava tubes. Lava tubes are cave-like volcanic straights formed by the hardening of overlaying lava. These structures help further the propagation of lava, as the walls of the tube insulate the lava within. Lava tubes can account for a large portion of shield volcano activity; for example, an estimated 58% of the lava forming Kīlauea comes from lava tubes.

In some shield volcano eruptions, basaltic lava pours out of a long fissure instead of a central vent, and shrouds the countryside with a long band of volcanic material in the form of a broad plateau. Plateaus of this type exist in Iceland, Washington, Oregon, and Idaho; the most prominent ones are situated along the Snake River in Idaho and the Columbia River in Washington and Oregon, where they have been measured to be over 1 mi (2 km) in thickness.

Calderas are a common feature on shield volcanoes. They are formed and reformed over the volcano's lifespan. Long eruptive periods form cinder cones, which then collapse over time to form calderas. The calderas are often filled up by progressive eruptions, or formed elsewhere, and this cycle of collapse and regeneration takes place throughout the volcano's lifespan.

Interactions between water and lava at shield volcanoes can cause some eruptions to become hydrovolcanic. These explosive eruptions are drastically different from the usual shield volcanic activity and are especially prevalent at the waterbound volcanoes of the Hawaiian Isles.

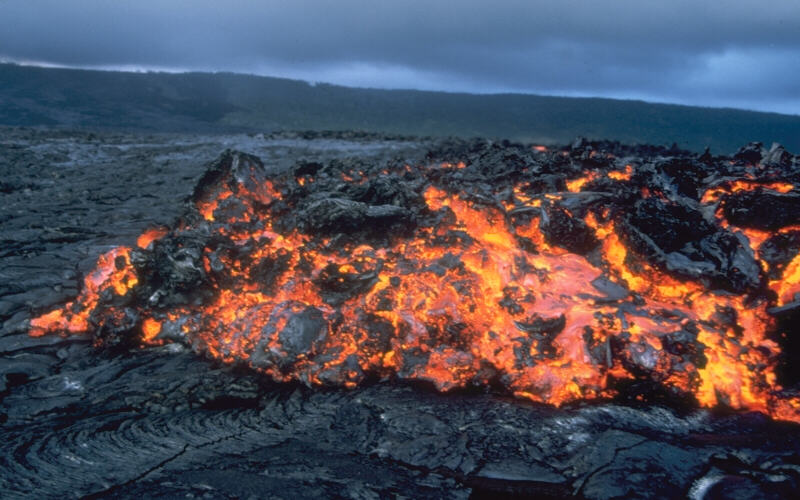
ʻAʻa advances over solidified pāhoehoe on Kīlauea, Hawaiʻi

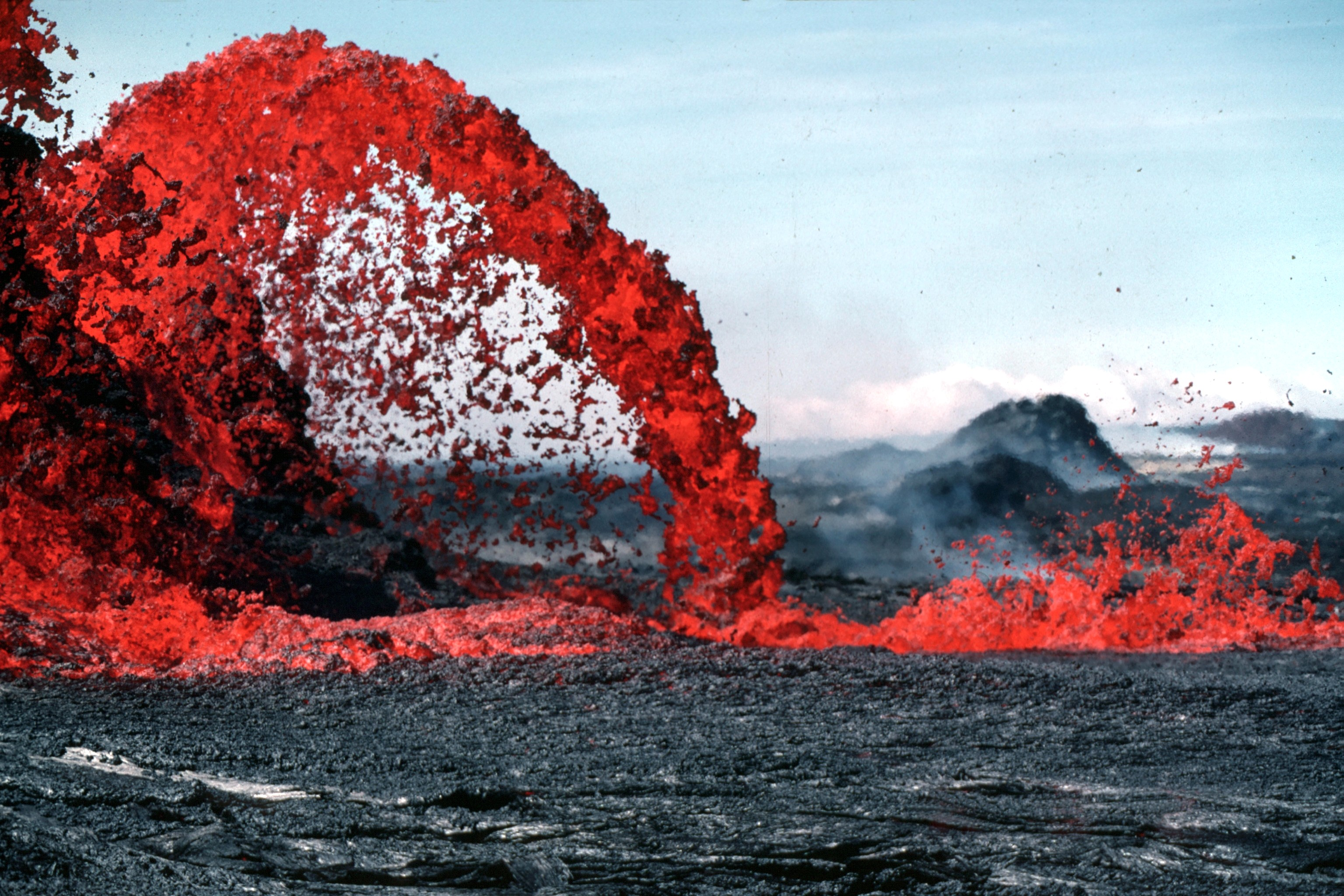
A pāhoehoe lava fountain on Kīlauea erupts

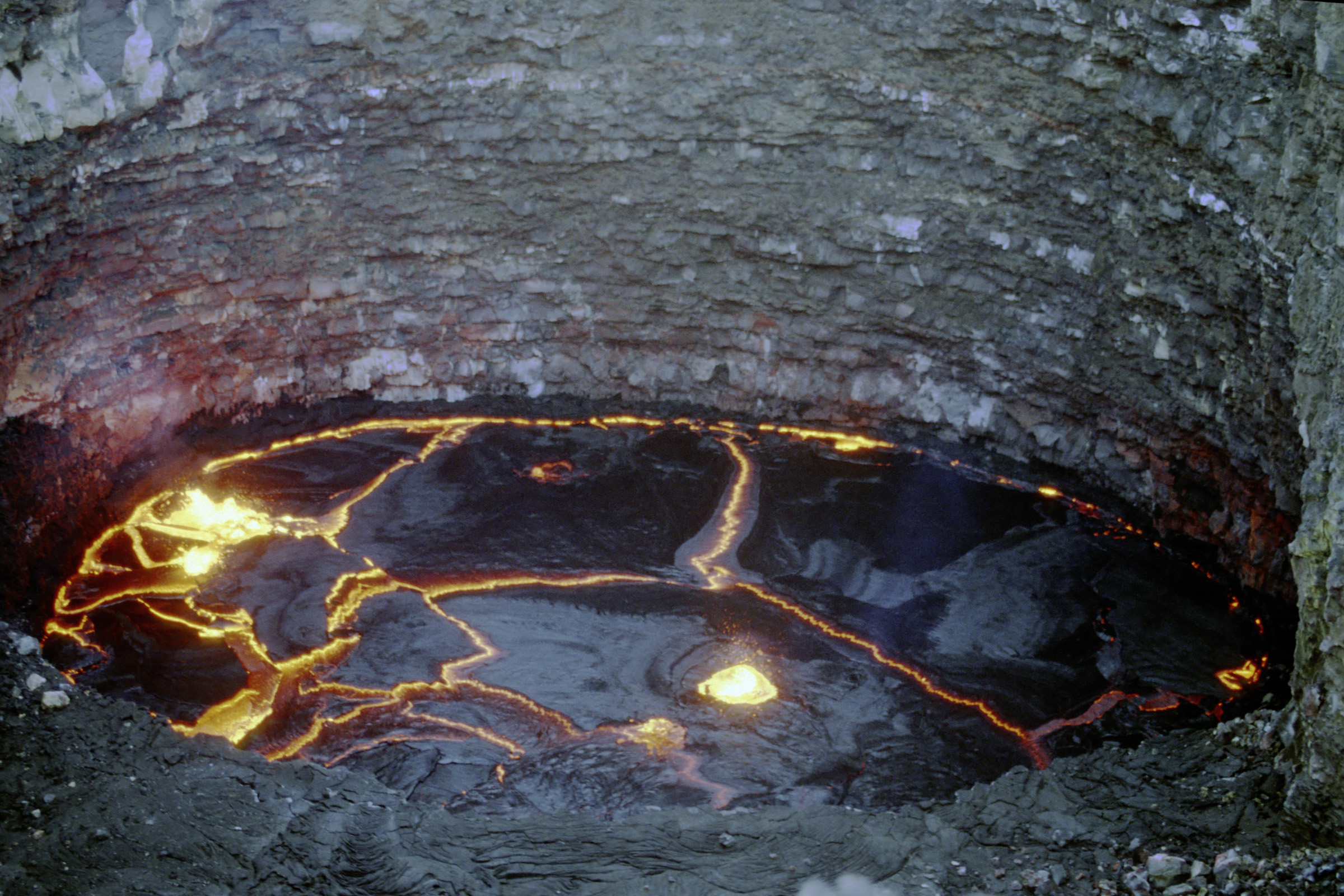
A lava lake in the caldera of Erta Ale, an active shield volcano in Ethiopia

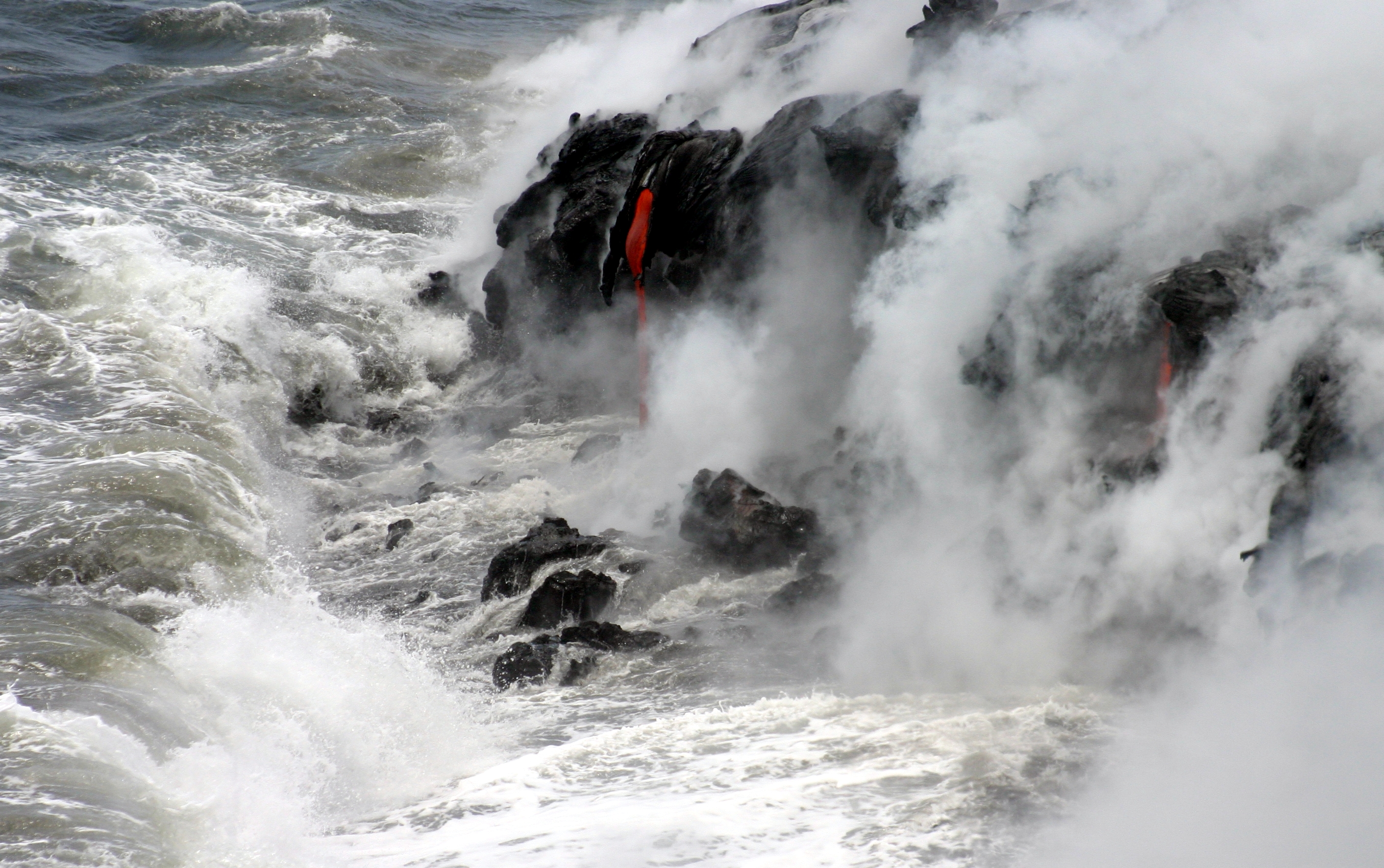
Pāhoehoe flows enter the Pacific Ocean on Hawaiʻi island

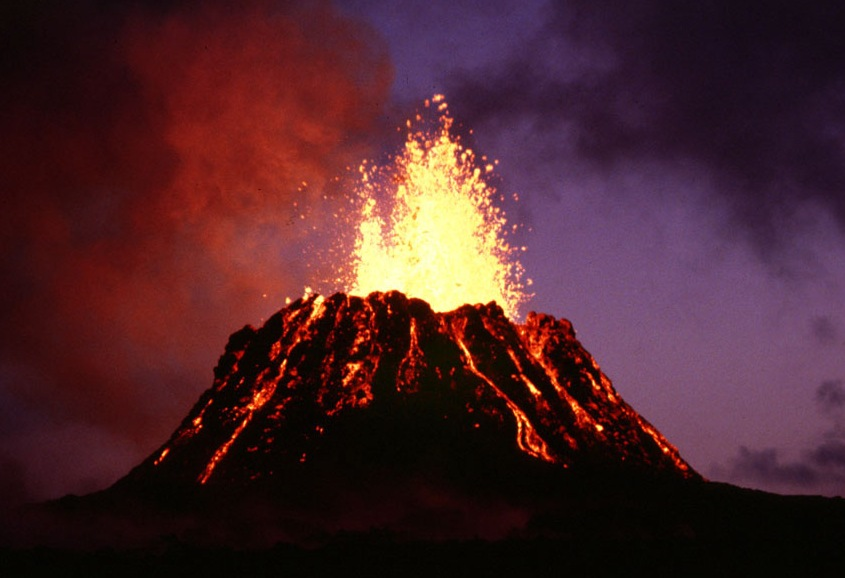
Puʻu ʻŌʻō, a parasitic cinder cone on Kīlauea, lava fountaining at dusk in June 1983, near the start of its eruptive cycle

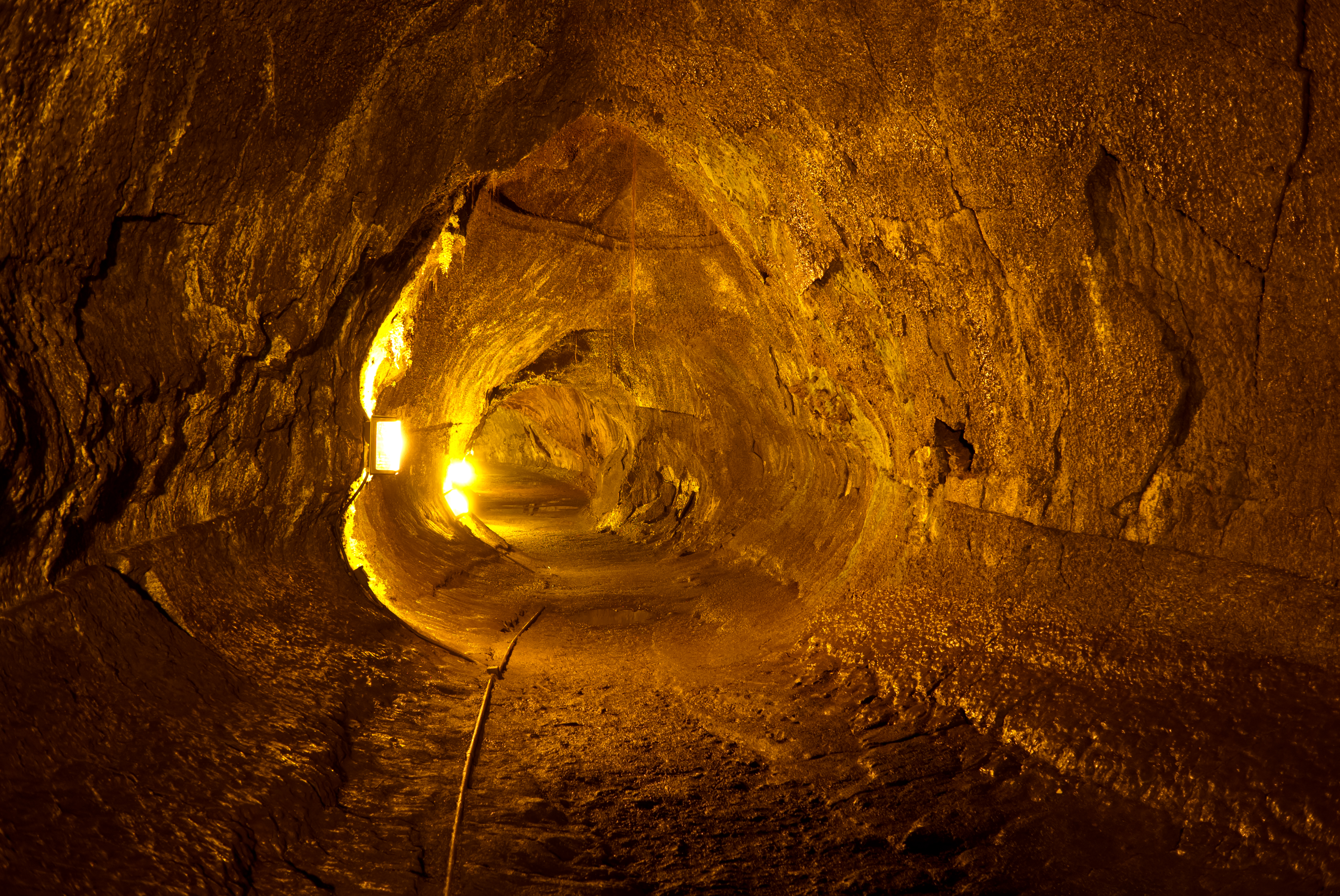
Nāhuku, a lava tube on Hawaiʻi island, now a tourist attraction in the Hawaiʻi Volcanoes National Park

== Distribution ==
Shield volcanoes are found worldwide. They can form over hotspots (points where magma from below the surface wells up), such as the Hawaiian–Emperor seamount chain and the Galápagos Islands, or over more conventional rift zones, such as the Icelandic shields and the shield volcanoes of East Africa. Although shield volcanoes are not usually associated with subduction, they can occur over subduction zones. Many examples are found in California and Oregon, including Prospect Peak in Lassen Volcanic National Park, as well as Pelican Butte and Belknap Crater in Oregon. Many shield volcanoes are found in ocean basins, such as Kīlauea in Hawaii, although they can be found inland as well—East Africa being one example of this.

As of April 2026, there is evidence of volcanic activity having occurred at 114 of Earth's shield volcanoes during the Holocene Epoch (the last 11,700 years).

=== Hawaiian–Emperor seamount chain ===
The largest and most prominent shield volcano chain in the world is the Hawaiian–Emperor seamount chain, a chain of hotspot volcanoes in the Pacific Ocean. The volcanoes follow a distinct evolutionary pattern of growth and death. The chain contains at least 43 major volcanoes, and Meiji Seamount at its terminus near the Kuril–Kamchatka Trench is 85 million years old.

The youngest part of the chain is Hawaii, where the volcanoes are characterized by frequent rift eruptions, their large size (thousands of km^{3} in volume), and their rough, decentralized shape. Rift zones are a prominent feature on these volcanoes and account for their seemingly random volcanic structure. They are fueled by the movement of the Pacific Plate over the Hawaii hotspot and form a long chain of volcanoes, atolls, and seamounts 2,600 km (1,616 mi) long with a total volume of over 750,000 km^{3} (179,935 cu mi).

The chain includes Mauna Loa, a shield volcano which stands 4,170 m (13,680 ft) above sea level and reaches a further 13 km (8 mi) below the waterline and into the crust, approximately 80,000 km^{3} (19,000 cu mi) of rock. Kīlauea, another Hawaiian shield volcano, is one of the most active volcanoes on Earth, with its most recent eruption occurring in 2021.

=== Galápagos Islands ===
The Galápagos Islands are an isolated set of volcanoes, consisting of shield volcanoes and lava plateaus, about 1,100 km (680 mi) west of Ecuador. They are driven by the Galápagos hotspot, and are between approximately 4.2 million and 700,000 years of age. The largest island, Isabela, consists of six coalesced shield volcanoes, each delineated by a large summit caldera. Española, the oldest island, and Fernandina, the youngest, are also shield volcanoes, as are most of the other islands in the chain. The Galápagos Islands are perched on a large lava plateau known as the Galápagos Platform. This platform creates a shallow water depth of 360 to 900 m (1,181 to 2,953 ft) at the base of the islands, which stretch over a 174 mi (280 km) diameter. Since Charles Darwin's visit to the islands in 1835 during the second voyage of HMS Beagle, there have been over 60 recorded eruptions in the islands, from six different shield volcanoes. Of the 21 emergent volcanoes, 13 are considered active.

Cerro Azul is a shield volcano on the southwestern part of Isabela Island and is one of the most active in the Galapagos, with the last eruption between May and June 2008. The Geophysics Institute at the National Polytechnic School in Quito houses an international team of seismologists and volcanologists whose responsibility is to monitor Ecuador's numerous active volcanoes in the Andean Volcanic Belt and the Galapagos Islands. La Cumbre is an active shield volcano on Fernandina Island that has been erupting since April 11, 2009.

The Galápagos islands are geologically young for such a big chain, and the pattern of their rift zones follows one of two trends, one north-northwest, and one east–west. The composition of the lavas of the Galápagos shields are strikingly similar to those of the Hawaiian volcanoes. They do not form the same volcanic "line" associated with most hotspots. They are not alone in this regard; the Cobb–Eickelberg Seamount chain in the North Pacific is another example of such a delineated chain. In addition, there is no clear pattern of age between the volcanoes, suggesting a complicated, irregular pattern of creation. How the islands were formed remains a geological mystery, although several theories have been proposed.

=== Iceland ===
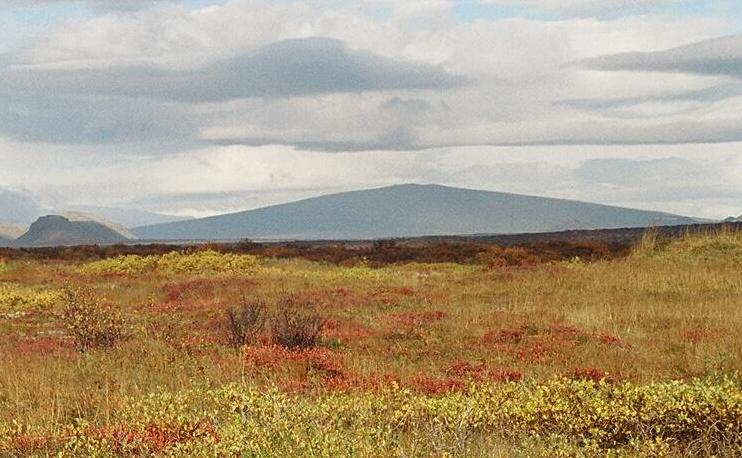
Skjaldbreiður is a shield volcano in Iceland, whose name means broad shield in Icelandic.

Located over the Mid-Atlantic Ridge, a divergent tectonic plate boundary in the middle of the Atlantic Ocean, Iceland is the site of about 130 volcanoes of various types. Icelandic shield volcanoes are generally of Holocene age, between 5,000 and 10,000 years old. The volcanoes are also very narrow in distribution, occurring in two bands in the West and North Volcanic Zones. Like Hawaiian volcanoes, their formation initially begins with several eruptive centers before centralizing and concentrating at a single point. The main shield then forms, burying the smaller ones formed by the early eruptions with its lava.

Icelandic shields are mostly small (~15 km^{3} (4 cu mi)), symmetrical (although this can be affected by surface topography), and characterized by eruptions from summit calderas. They are composed of either tholeiitic olivine or picritic basalt. The tholeiitic shields tend to be wider and shallower than the picritic shields. They do not follow the pattern of caldera growth and destruction that other shield volcanoes do; caldera may form, but they generally do not disappear.

=== East Africa ===
In East Africa, volcanic activity is generated by the development of the East African Rift and from nearby hotspots. Some volcanoes interact with both. Shield volcanoes are found near the rift and off the coast of Africa, although stratovolcanoes are more common. Although sparsely studied, the fact that all of its volcanoes are of Holocene age reflects how young the volcanic center is. One interesting characteristic of East African volcanism is a penchant for the formation of lava lakes; these semi-permanent lava bodies, extremely rare elsewhere, form in about 9% of African eruptions.

The most active shield volcano in Africa is Nyamuragira. Eruptions at the shield volcano are generally centered within the large summit caldera or on the numerous fissures and cinder cones on the volcano's flanks. Lava flows from the most recent century extend down the flanks more than 30 km (19 mi) from the summit, reaching as far as Lake Kivu. Erta Ale in Ethiopia is another active shield volcano and one of the few places in the world with a permanent lava lake, which has been active since at least 1967, and possibly since 1906. Other volcanic centers include Menengai, a massive shield caldera, and Mount Marsabit in Kenya.

=== Extraterrestrial shield volcanoes ===
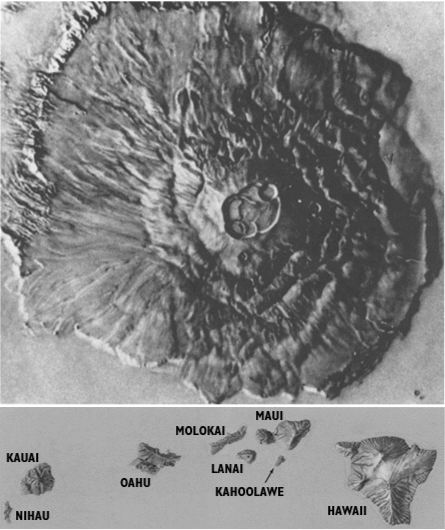
Scaled image showing Olympus Mons, top, and the Hawaiian island chain, bottom. Martian volcanoes are far larger than those found on Earth.

Shield volcanoes are not limited to Earth; they have been found on Mars, Venus, and Jupiter's moon, Io.

The shield volcanoes of Mars are very similar to the shield volcanoes on Earth. On both planets, they have gently sloping flanks, collapse craters along their central structure, and are built of highly fluid lavas. Volcanic features on Mars were observed long before they were first studied in detail during the 1976–1979 Viking mission. The principal difference between the volcanoes of Mars and those on Earth is in terms of size; Martian volcanoes range in size up to 14 mi (23 km) high and 370 mi (595 km) in diameter, far larger than the 6 mi (10 km) high, 74 mi (119 km) wide Hawaiian shields. The highest of these, Olympus Mons, is the tallest known mountain on any planet in the solar system.

Venus has over 150 shield volcanoes which are much flatter, with a larger surface area than those found on Earth, some having a diameter of more than 700 km (430 mi). Although the majority of these are long extinct it has been suggested, from observations by the Venus Express spacecraft, that many may still be active.
