= Lupica Formation =

Geological formation in northern Chile

- Stratigraphic range: Paleogene
- Underlies: Chucal Formation, Oxaya Formation?
- Overlies: Belén Metamorphic Complex

Lithology
- Primary: Tuff, volcanic breccia, sedimentary breccia, fluvial conglomerate, andesite, dacite, fluvial sandstone

Location
- Region: Arica y Parinacota Region
- Country: Chile

Lupica Formation (Spanish: Formación Lupica) is a volcano-sedimentary geological formation in the Andes of Arica y Parinacota Region in northernmost Chile. There have been differing views on the relative age and stratigraphy of Lupica Formation, to some authors, it is an eastern equivalent of the Miocene Oxaya Formation, yet others consider it is an older formation that underlies part of the Oxaya Formation. According to Wotzlaw and co-workers the lower part of the formation originated from a nearby volcanic arc that existed in the Eocene.

Azapa Formation contain clasts that possibly derive from Lupica Formation.
