= Purico complex =

Pleistocene volcanic complex in Chile

Puricó complex
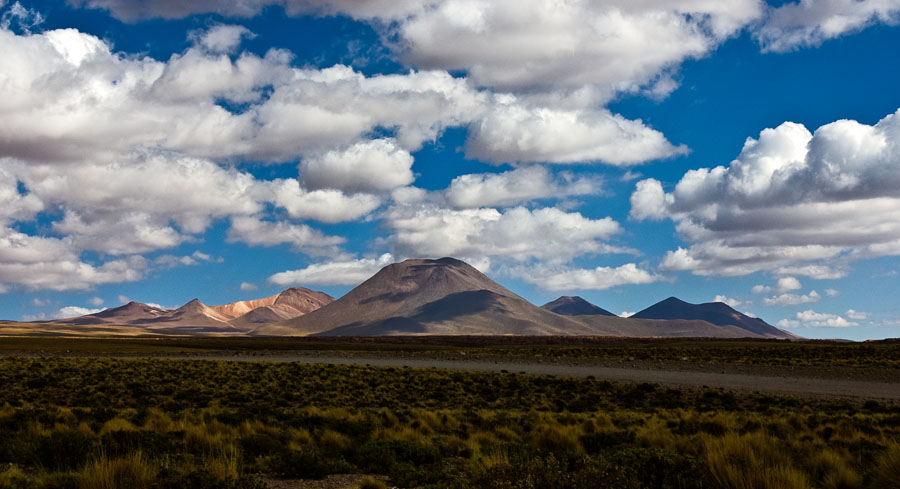
- The southwest part of the complex is formed by the cinder cone Cerro Negro and the stratovolcano Cerros de Macón.

Highest point
- Elevation: 5,703 m (18,711 ft)
- Coordinates: 22°57′S 67°45′W

Geography
- Location: Chile

Geology
- Rock age: Holocene
- Mountain type(s): Pyroclastic shield, volcanic complex

The Purico complex is a Pleistocene volcanic complex in Chile close to Bolivia, formed by an ignimbrite, several lava domes and stratovolcanoes and one maar. It is in the Chilean segment of the Central Volcanic Zone, one of the four volcanic belts which make up the Andean Volcanic Belt. The Central Volcanic Zone spans Peru, Bolivia, Chile and Argentina and includes 44 active volcanoes as well as the Altiplano–Puna volcanic complex, a system of large calderas and ignimbrites of which Purico is a member. Licancabur to the north, La Pacana southeast and Guayaques to the east are separate volcanic systems.

The Purico complex consists of a shield shaped volcanic structure consisting of the Purico ignimbrite and a number of secondary volcanoes that are emplaced on this volcanic shield. During the ice ages, the shield was in part covered by glaciers which have left moraines. Purico is the source of the Purico ignimbrite, which has a volume of about 80–100 cubic kilometres (19–24 cu mi). After the emplacement of the Purico ignimbrite, a number of lava domes and stratovolcanoes developed on the ignimbrite shield. The maar of Alitar is still fumarolically active. In historical times, sulfur was mined on Purico. Today, the Llano de Chajnantor Observatory lies on the ignimbrite shield.

== Geography and structure ==
The Purico complex, whose name may derive from the word puri, which may mean "water" in Atacameno, lies in Chile close to the border between Bolivia and Chile, east of the town of San Pedro de Atacama and northeast of Toconao. The volcanic complex can be seen from San Pedro de Atacama. A road runs along the northern and eastern margin of the Purico complex, and a gas pipeline crosses the volcano. The existence of the Purico volcanic complex was established on the basis of Landsat images.

=== Regional ===
Licancabur volcano was constructed on ignimbrites from Purico just north of the complex. Guayaques lies east of Purico, the La Pacana caldera is located southeast of the complex, and La Pacana's Filo Delgado ignimbrite has buried part of the Purico ignimbrite. The known volcanoes Lascár and El Tatio are found at larger distances from Purico.

Purico is part of the Central Volcanic Zone (CVZ), a belt of volcanoes that runs along the western margin of South America between 14° and 28° southern latitude. This 1,500 kilometres (930 mi) long belt is one of four separate volcanic belts that make up the Andean Volcanic Belt. They are separated from each other by gaps where no recent volcanism occurs. The CVZ segment includes 44 active systems, 18 minor volcanic centres and over 6 large ignimbrite or caldera systems. One of these volcanoes, Ojos del Salado, is the highest volcano in the world. The largest historical eruption in the CVZ occurred in 1600 at Huaynaputina in Peru while Lascár is its most active member, with a major eruption in 1993.

=== Local ===
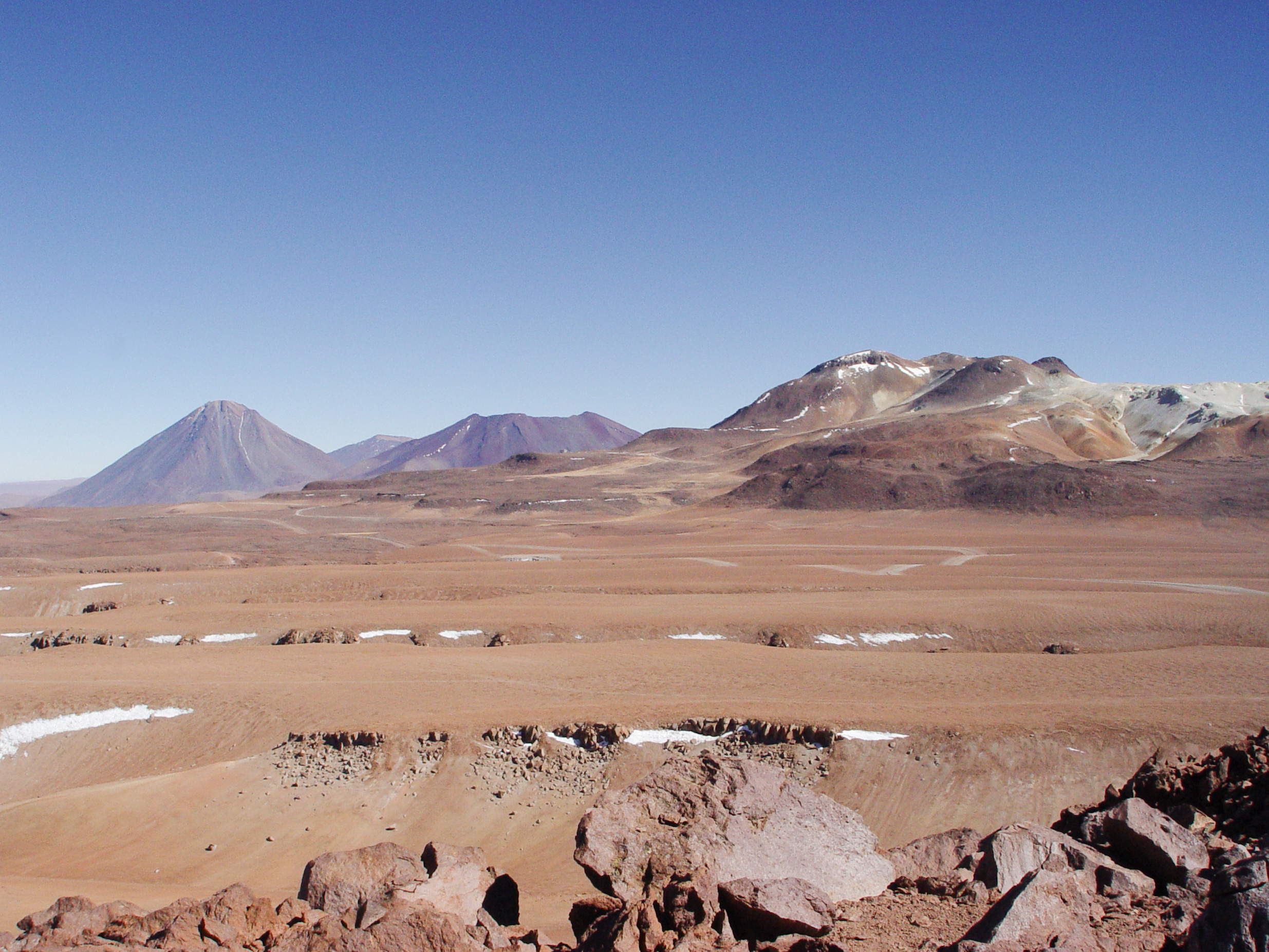
A view across the Purico complex

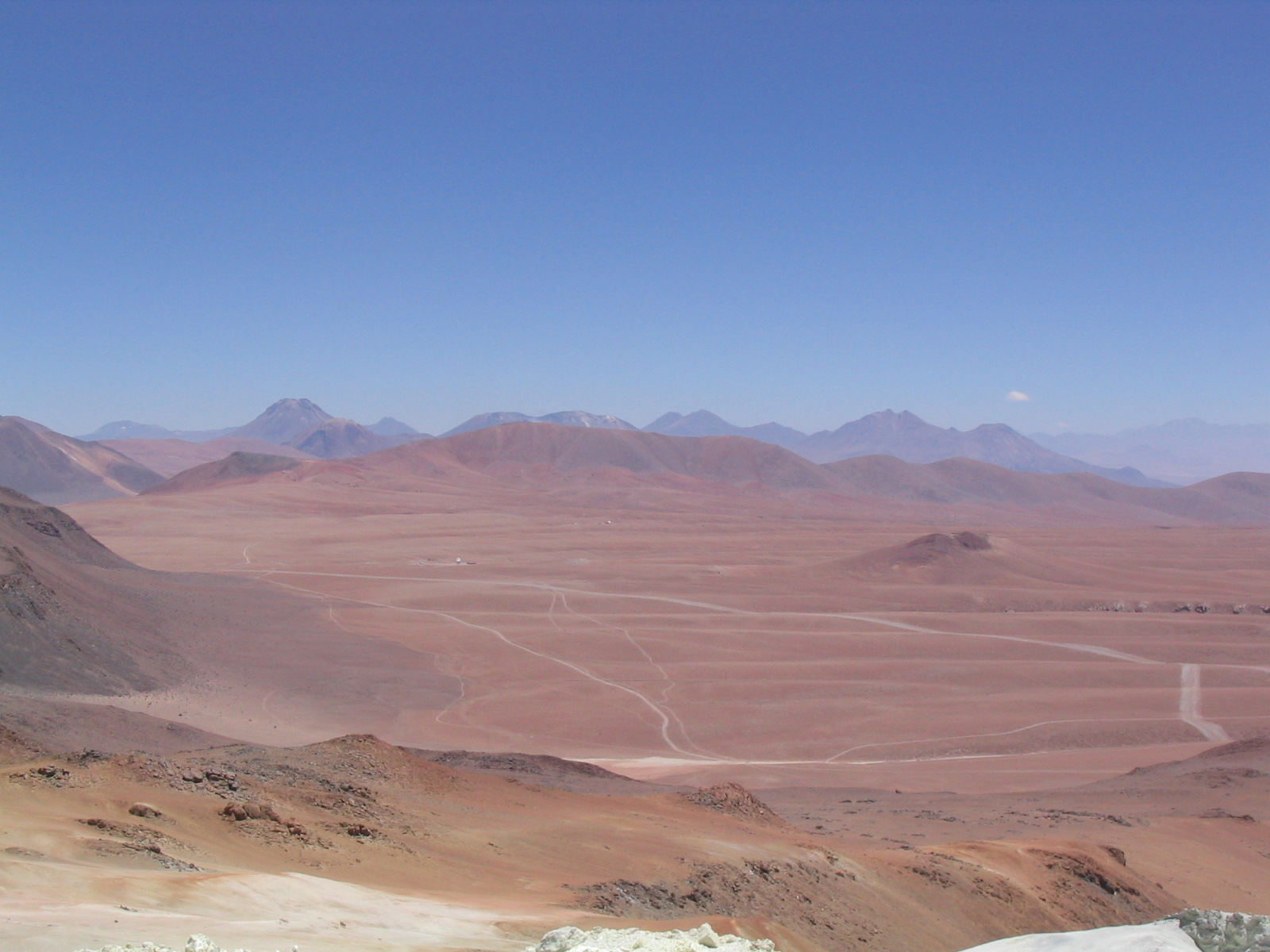
The Purico shield seen from Cerro Toco

Purico is a circular shield with a diameter of 15–25 kilometres (9.3–15.5 mi), whose slopes descend away from a centre at an elevation of 5,000 metres (16,000 ft). This shield forms a plateau, which is known as the Chajnantor (Note: Meaning "launch site" in the Kunza language) Plateau, and which contains further flat areas such as Llano de Chajnantor, Pampa El Vallecito and Pampa La Bola. There is no evidence that a caldera exists there, unlike in many other volcanoes of this type. To the west, close to the margin of the Salar de Atacama, the shield drops down to a bajada (Note: A structure formed by debris flows and gravel fans.). A north-south trending system of fractures and conspicuous normal faults cuts across the western margin of the Purico complex.

On top of this shield, a complex of lava domes and lavas reaches elevations of over 5,800 metres (19,000 ft) above sea level; the vent of the ignimbrite may be buried beneath this complex. This complex forms approximately a 10 by 20 kilometres (6.2 mi × 12.4 mi) wide semicircle open to the southwest around the centre of the shield, which may reflect the existence of a ring fault on which the individual centres were emplaced.

Clockwise starting from the west this semicircle includes 5,016 metres (16,457 ft) high Cerro Negro (23°1′0″S 67°51′0″W), Cerro Purico, "dacite dome D" and 5,639 metres (18,501 ft) high El Cerillo which is also known as Cerro Chajnantor (22°59′0″S 67°44′0″W), 5,703 metres (18,711 ft) high Cerro El Chascon (23°1′0″S 67°41′0″W), the 5,262 metres (17,264 ft) high Cerro Aspero (23°5′0″S 67°42′0″W and the 5,462 metres (17,920 ft) high Cerro Putas (23°6′0″S 67°43′0″W) to the south. All these domes (with the exception of the pancake-like "dacite dome D") have conical shapes, and Aspero, El Cerillo and El Chascon appear to be post-glacial in age.

The Chascon dome is constructed by lava flows and has a well preserved summit crater, while Cerro Purico is a stratovolcano and also known as Cerro Toco (22°57′0″S 67°47′0″W). Additional more subdued structures in the principal complex are 5,058 metres (16,594 ft) high Cerro Agua Amarga (23°1′0″S 67°43′0″W) just southwest of El Chascon and the Cordon Honor with Cerro Purico Sur in the "opening" of the semicircle. Lahars and debris flows from the volcanoes have covered parts of the ignimbrite shield with gravels. A meltwater-fed spring on Cerro Toco is known as Aguada Pajaritos, and a small lake Laguna de Agua Amarga is found south of Chascon. Presently, the Purico complex forms the drainage divide between the Salar de Atacama and the Salar de Pujsa. The 5,130 metres (16,830 ft) high Macon stratovolcano (23°2′0″S 67°49′0″W), Alitar maar (23°9′0″S 67°38′0″W) and 5,346 metres (17,539 ft) high Alitar volcano (23°09′S 67°38′W) lie to the south of the main complex. Alitar maar is located is 500 metres (1,600 ft) wide and 50 metres (160 ft) deep.

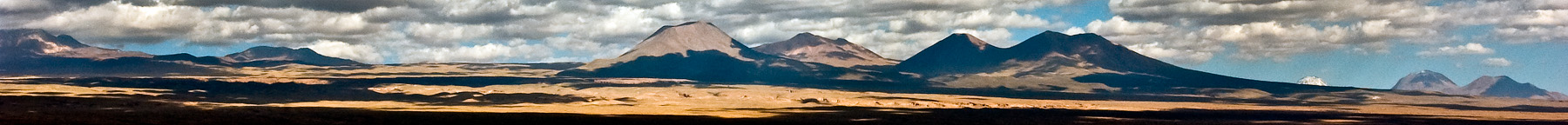

== Geology ==
West of South America, the Nazca Plate subducts beneath the South America Plate at rates of 9–7 centimetres per year (3.5–2.8 in/year). This subduction process along with that of the Antarctic Plate beneath the South American Plate farther south is responsible for volcanism in the Andean Volcanic Belt.

Volcanic activity in the region of the Central Volcanic Zone has been ongoing for 200 million years, but with temporal and local variations; 25 million years ago for example it was centered farther east and later moved west. About 23 million years ago, large scale ignimbritic activity commenced in the region with the emplacement of the Oxaya Formation, followed by the Altos de Pica Formation 17-15 million years ago. However, effusive activity of andesitic composition dominated volcanism until the late Miocene.

=== Regional ===
Purico appears to be part of a group of large, caldera-forming volcanic centres that erupted dacitic ignimbrites, a group that is known as the Altiplano-Puna volcanic complex. This group includes the Cerro Guacha, Cerro Panizos, Coranzulí, La Pacana, Pastos Grandes and Vilama centres that cluster around the tripoint between Argentina, Bolivia and Chile. The arid climate of this region means that most volcanic systems are well preserved with little erosion.

This complex is underpinned by a magma body at depths of 15–35 kilometres (9.3–21.7 mi), where arc magmas interact with the crust to form the secondary magmas later erupted by the volcanoes of the Altiplano-Puna volcanic complex. This magma body has been imaged with seismic tomography as a sill-like body and has been named the "Altiplano-Puna magma body".

Ignimbritic activity in such systems is episodic, being interrupted by periods with lower volume "steady state" volcanism. The eruption of the Purico ignimbrite is the youngest large ignimbrite eruption in the Altiplano-Puna volcanic complex; the Altiplano-Puna volcanic complex presently is in such a "steady state" stage, but the presence of active geothermal system indicates that magmatic activity is still ongoing.

=== Local ===
Outcrops in the region range in age from Paleozoic to Holocene. The Purico complex formed on top of older ignimbrites such as the Puripicar ignimbrite in the north, the Atana and the La Pacana ignimbrites farther south. The neighbouring La Pacana caldera between 4.5 and 4.1 million years ago erupted some of these ignimbrites including the Atana ignimbrite. Occasionally Purico is considered part of the La Pacana system.

=== Composition ===
The Purico complex has erupted various different magmas, ranging from the dacitic Purico ignimbrite over rhyolitic pumices contained in the ignimbrite to the andesitic-dacitic post-ignimbrite volcanics. Dacite is the dominant component and forms a crystal-rich potassium-rich suite. Varying amounts of phenocrysts occur in the Purico complex rocks; the minerals they are formed of include augite, biotite, clinopyroxene, hornblende, hypersthene, iron oxides, oligoclase, orthopyroxene, plagioclase, quartz and titanium oxides.

Additionally, mafic xenoliths are found in the Purico ignimbrite; such xenoliths are a common finding in volcanic arc rocks. They are even more common in Chascon rocks, where they might reflect the occurrence of mafic magma in the feeder system prior to the formation of Chascon.

Some physical properties of the Purico magmas have been inferred from the chemistry and petrology of the erupted rocks. The dacites had temperatures of about 750–810 °C (1,380–1,490 °F) while the andesites and rhyolites reached higher temperatures, up to 800–880 °C (1,470–1,620 °F). Water contents ranged from 3.2 to 4.8% by weight, while carbon dioxide concentrations were low throughout.

== Climate and vegetation ==
The climate at Purico is cold, with annual mean temperatures of −3 – −4 °C (27–25 °F); during summer it hovers around 0 °C (32 °F) and during winter it can decrease to −6 °C (21 °F). Because of the high altitude, the air is thin and ultraviolet radiation is high. Llano del Chajnantor features the world's highest insolation, which under particular meteorological conditions can approach that at Venus. There is little precipitation in the area (about 200 millimetres per year (7.9 in/year) on the upper parts of the shield, decreasing to less than 10 millimetres per year (0.39 in/year) close to the Salar de Atacama), which mainly happens during the summer months as a consequence of the South American monsoon. Snow also falls during winter but winter snow mainly evaporates while summer snow melts. This dry climate is due to the combined effects of the subtropical ridge, the Humboldt Current in the Pacific Ocean and the rain shadow exercised by the Andes.

The dry climate and high elevation mean that vegetation is scarce in the region, with cacti such as Echinopsis atacamensis and grasses occurring at lower elevations. The little vegetation that is present displays an altitudinal zonation with a lower "Prepuna" with shrubs and succulents, a middle "Puna" with grasses and shrubs and a "high Andean steppe" with bunch grass. A report in 1993 stated that red-brown cacti and brown grass grew around the foot of Purico. Conversely, the soils on the Purico complex contain a diverse population of microbes which have to tolerate extreme environmental conditions. Among these are the bacteria Amycolatopsis vastitatis, Lentzea chajnantorensis, Micromonospora acroterricola, Micromonospora arida, Micromonospora inaquosa, Modestobacter altitudinis, Modestobacter excelsi, Nocardiopsis deserti and Streptomyces aridus which were first isolated at the Purico complex. Some of these yield pharmacologically interesting compounds.

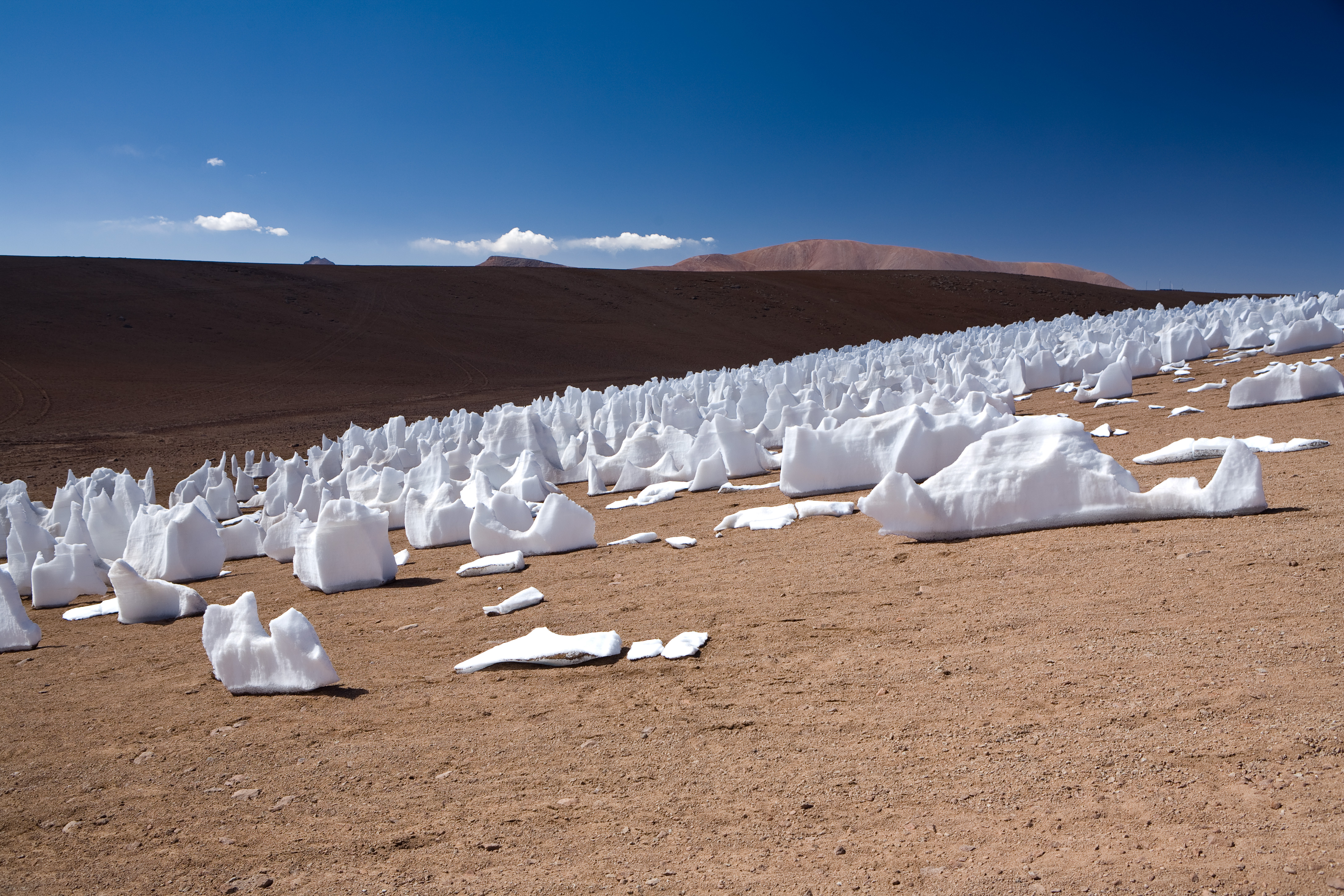
Penitentes on Purico

Increased moisture availability during the ice ages caused the development of glaciers on Purico; at times, an ice cap with outlet glaciers covered an area of 200 square kilometres (77 sq mi)-250 square kilometres (97 sq mi) at 5,000 metres (16,000 ft) elevation on Purico. Apparently three different stages of glaciation occurred, the third between 30,000–25,000 years ago, the second between 50,000–60,000 years ago and the first over 100,000 years ago. Moraines associated with Lake Tauca appear to be either small or nonexistent. These glaciations have left moraines on Purico which extend for many kilometres at altitudes of 4,400–4,600 metres (14,400–15,100 ft), sometimes descending as far down as 4,200 metres (13,800 ft). The moraines reach heights of 10 metres (33 ft) on the eastern side of Purico and 2–5 metres (6 ft 7 in – 16 ft 5 in) on its western side. These moraines are covered with boulders and accompanied by striated surfaces and erratics. There are no present-day glaciers in the region, but the ground is covered in snow featuring penitentes for part of the year. Permafrost with active freeze-thaw cycles has been identified underground and is associated with periglacial phenomena like patterned ground.

== Eruptive history ==
The Purico complex is the source of the major Purico ignimbrite, which was emplaced at the time of the Jaramillo geomagnetic reversal. It was originally called Cajon ignimbrite and attributed to an area northwest of Purico known as Chaxas. Also, the Toconao ignimbrite was originally attributed to the Purico complex, but now the La Pacana caldera is considered to be its source.

The Purico ignimbrite itself covers a surface area of 1,500 square kilometres (580 sq mi) over the whole complex, and its volume has been estimated to be 80–100 cubic kilometres (19–24 cu mi) with an additional 0.4 cubic kilometres (0.096 cu mi) contributed by tephra fall deposits. The ignimbrite is 250 metres (820 ft) thick and becomes thinner westward, with more distal sectors reaching thicknesses of 25 metres (82 ft). Potassium-argon dating has yielded ages between 1,380,000 ± 70,000 and 870,000 ± 520,000 years ago for the Purico ignimbrite. The 2 cubic kilometres (0.48 cu mi) large "dacitic dome D" has an age of 980,000 ± 50,000 and may thus have formed at the same time as the ignimbrites. The emplacement of the Purico ignimbrite was part of a pulse of activity in the Altiplano-Puna volcanic complex 1 million years ago.

The Purico ignimbrite contains three flow units, the two Lower Purico Ignimbrites and the Upper Purico Ignimbrite. Their thicknesses differ; the Upper ignimbrite is 10–12 metres (33–39 ft) thick while the two lower ones together reach an average thickness of 30 metres (98 ft), with a maximum of 80 metres (260 ft). The lowermost Lower Purico Ignimbrite is one single flow. The upper Lower Purico Ignimbrite is more heterogeneous, starting with a base surge, a pumice layer and then another flow unit, which is volumetrically the largest part. The Lower Purico Ignimbrite covers a surface of 800 square kilometres (310 sq mi) primarily on the western side of the Purico complex. Finally, the Upper Purico Ignimbrite is a moderately to densely welded flow that occurs particularly close to the summit of the Purico complex, where it forms six flow units that contain fiamme textures. Characteristic for the Purico ignimbrite is the so-called "banded" pumice, which consist of alternating darker mafic and brighter components, in the upper 33% of the ignimbrite. The extrusion of the Purico ignimbrite was accompanied by the eruption of large amounts of tephra, some of which fell as far as the Coastal Cordillera west of Purico.

After emplacement, the ignimbrites were modified by fluvial erosion, which formed curvilinear channels in the ignimbrites. In contrast to other ignimbrites in the region, there is little evidence of eolian erosion of the Purico ignimbrite. Eolian erosion takes much longer than fluvial erosion and it is possible that the Purico ignimbrite is too young to have been modified by wind action. Some surfaces of the ignimbrite have been affected by glaciation, giving them a smooth surface.

This structure of the ignimbrite has been explained by magma chamber processes. Prior to the Purico ignimbrite eruption, a dacitic magma chamber already existed beneath the volcano. Probably after an injection of andesitic magma, dacitic contents of the magma chamber escaped upwards and formed the lowermost Lower Purico Ignimbrite. This injection of mafic magma rapidly increased the temperature and gas content of the dacite, causing the eruption to become a violent Plinian eruption with the development of an eruption column. This phase then drew onto denser dacitic magma, causing the column to collapse and the Upper Purico Ignimbrite and the "dacite dome D" to form.

=== Post-ignimbrite activity ===
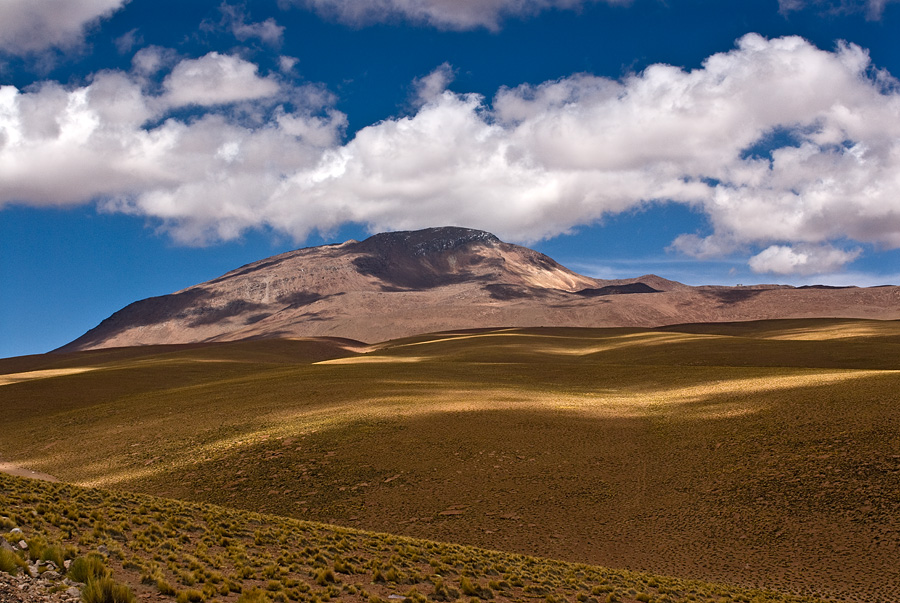
Cerro Toco

Volcanic activity after the eruption of the ignimbrite has been subdivided into the older andesitic Purico group and the younger Chascon group. The first includes Cerro Negro, Cerro Purico, Putas and Cerro Toco which assume the structure of polygenetic volcanoes, while the latter is taken to include Aspero, El Cerillo/Chajnantor and El Chascon which are lava dome-lava flow structures. The Chascon group of domes is also the only one which contains mafic xenoliths.

The Cerro Purico and Macon volcanoes formed a short time after, and possibly even before, the ignimbrites. They are thus old volcanic centres and deeply eroded, displaying moraine deposits from glaciation and rocks which have been subject to hydrothermal alteration from fumarolic activity. Such hydrothermal alteration processes, together with desublimation of fumarolic sulfur, are also the origin of the sulfur deposits at Purico.

Aspero, Cerro El Chascon, Cerros El Negro and Putas are younger and show no evidence of glaciation. El Chascon especially may be only tens of thousands of years old, seeing as it displays both a summit crater and pristine lava flow structures. Aspero was once considered to be of Holocene age in light of it and Chascon overlying moraines; later, dates of 180,000 ± 20,000 years ago were obtained on Aspero and Chascon. Apart from these, there are no radiometric dates for post-ignimbrite volcanic structures at Purico. The Alitar volcano is considered to be of Plio-Pleistocene age. The eruptive episode that formed these centres is thus more recent than the Purico ignimbrite and may have been triggered by mafic magma being injected into the Purico system. It is also much smaller, with volumes ranging 0.36–4 cubic kilometres (0.086–0.960 cu mi).

This change in the pattern of eruptive activity from large ignimbrites to smaller domes reflects a change in the nature of the magma supply, from large volume flow that heavily interacted with the crust and gave rise to the ignimbrites to smaller volume flows in a colder and thus brittler crust and did not accumulate or interact with it in a significant way. Thus the later eruption products appear to be more primitive and less affected by crustal contamination.

=== Holocene and fumarolic activity ===
Macon stratovolcano is considered to be of Holocene age, and Alitar maar displays active fumaroles and hot springs. There are no know historical eruptions of Alitar and there is no indication of seismic activity in the Purico area. Renewed activity at Alitar would likely be in the form of phreatic eruptions of only local significance.

The fumaroles of Alitar are concentrated in the northern and eastern parts of Alitar, while the hot springs occur in the Quepiaco creek area about 250 metres (820 ft) southwest of Alitar and consist of six separate small vents. The temperatures of the Alitar vents range between 54–57 °C (129–135 °F). Fumarolic gases are mostly water vapour, with lesser amounts of carbon dioxide, and sulfur deposition takes place. They appear to originate from both magmatic and precipitation water, with a large contribution from atmospheric air and an important role for a hydrothermal system.

== Human use ==
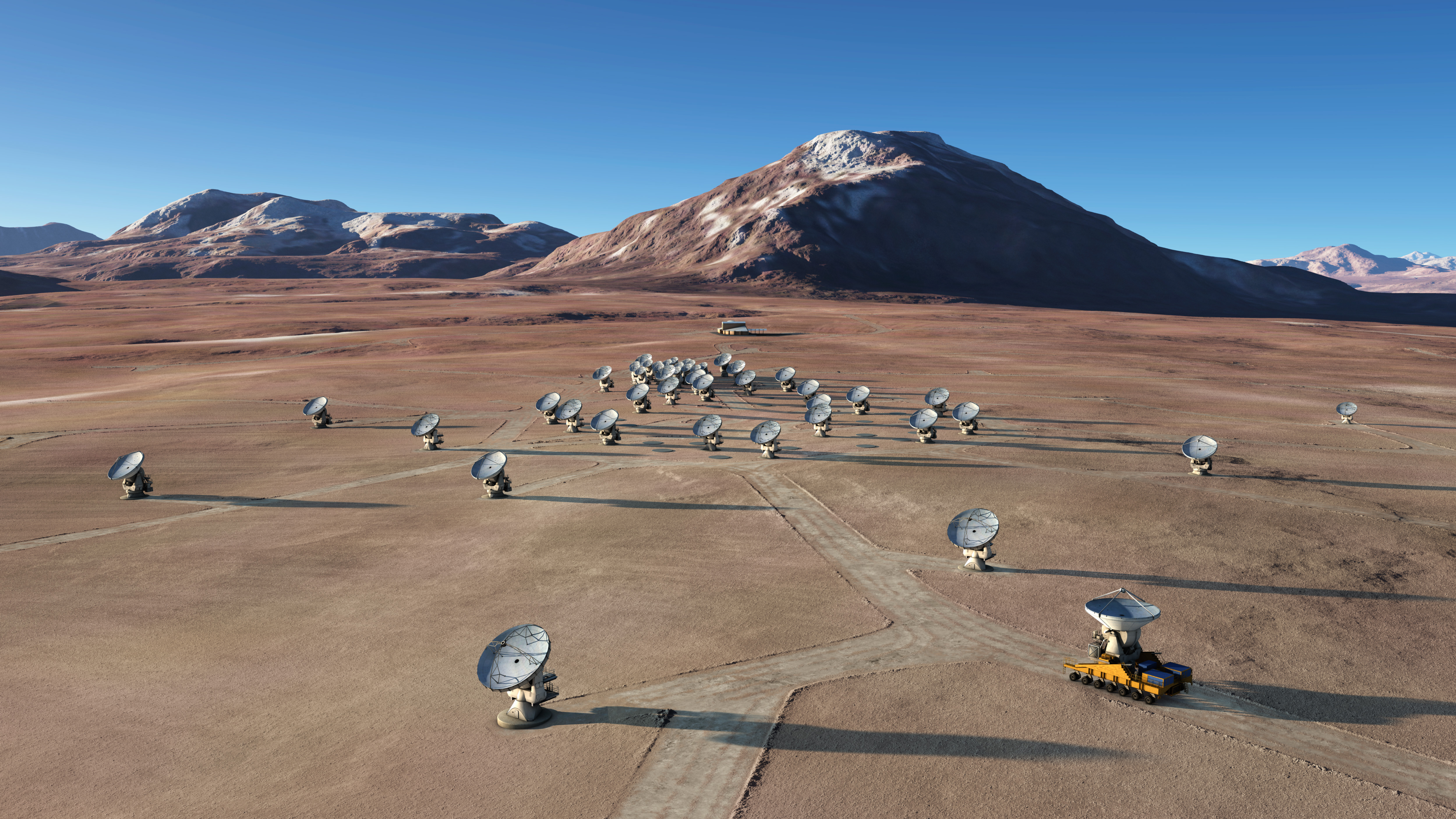
A CGI of the ALMA telescope site

The inhabitants of Toconao viewed Alitar as a protective mountain (Note: A protective mountain is a religious concept like an apu; such mountains received offers in the form of sacrifices.). Purico has been quarried for building materials, and many buildings in San Pedro de Atacama were built from rocks quarried there. As of 1984, Alitar was under investigation as a potential source of geothermal power. Two sulfur deposits occur at Purico, the first southeast of Cerro Toco and the second at Alitar. The Cerro Toco deposit was mined during the 20th century under often bad working conditions which were noted by the regional press, and as recently as 1993, sulfur was mined on Purico and transported by truck to San Pedro de Atacama where it was processed. The Purico deposit in 1968 was estimated to feature 4 million tons of caliche with a grade of 50%, while the Alitar deposit in that year amounted to 1.5 million tons of caliche with a grade of 60%. In 1993, production of sulfur amounted to 200 tonnes per month (2,400 t/a). A mining camp exists a few kilometres from Cerro Toco.

The Purico complex is the site of a number of astronomical observatories, including but not limited to the Llano de Chajnantor Observatory and the Atacama Large Millimeter Array, and an atmospheric observatory that is among the highest in the world. In 1998, the Cerro Chascón Science Preserve was established on Purico, which among other things disallows mining in the area of the preserve. This Science Preserve covers most of the Purico complex.

== See also ==
- List of volcanoes in Chile
- Ignimbrite
- Salar de Atacama
