= Belén Metamorphic Complex =

Unit of rocks in northern Chile

- Stratigraphic range: Paleozoic
- Type: Complex
- Underlies: Lupica Formation

Lithology
- Primary: Amphibolite, orthogneiss, serpentinite
- Other: Mica schist

Location
- Region: Arica y Parinacota Region
- Country: Chile

The Belén Metamorphic Complex (Spanish: Complejo metamórfico Belén) is a group of metamorphic and igneous rocks that crops out in the western edge of the Altiplano plateau in the interior of northernmost Chile. The rocks of the complex metamorphosed during the Early Paleozoic era but the original protoliths formed in the Proterozoic eon. This make rocks of the Belén Metamorphic Complex the oldest rocks known in Chile. To the west the rocks of the Belén Metamorphic Complex thrust along Chapiquiña-Belén fault over sediments of Cenozoic age including ignimbrites of the Oxaya Formation and rocks of Lupica Formation. At their peak conditions of metamorphism rocks reached temperatures and pressures of 700 C and 7 kbar. The timing of the metamorphism matches the age of the Famatinian orogeny in the Argentine Northwest. Rocks of the Belén Metamorphic Complex were involved in one or more orogenies in the Early Paleozoic.

Rocks of the complex include foliatied amphibolite, orthogneiss, serpentinite and lesser amounts of quartz-rich mica schist.

The rocks of complex have experienced continuous exhuming during the last 15 million years as part of the ongoing Andean orogeny, with an apparent exhumation spurt 11 to 7 million years ago.
