= Tamu Massif =

Seamount in the northwest Pacific Ocean

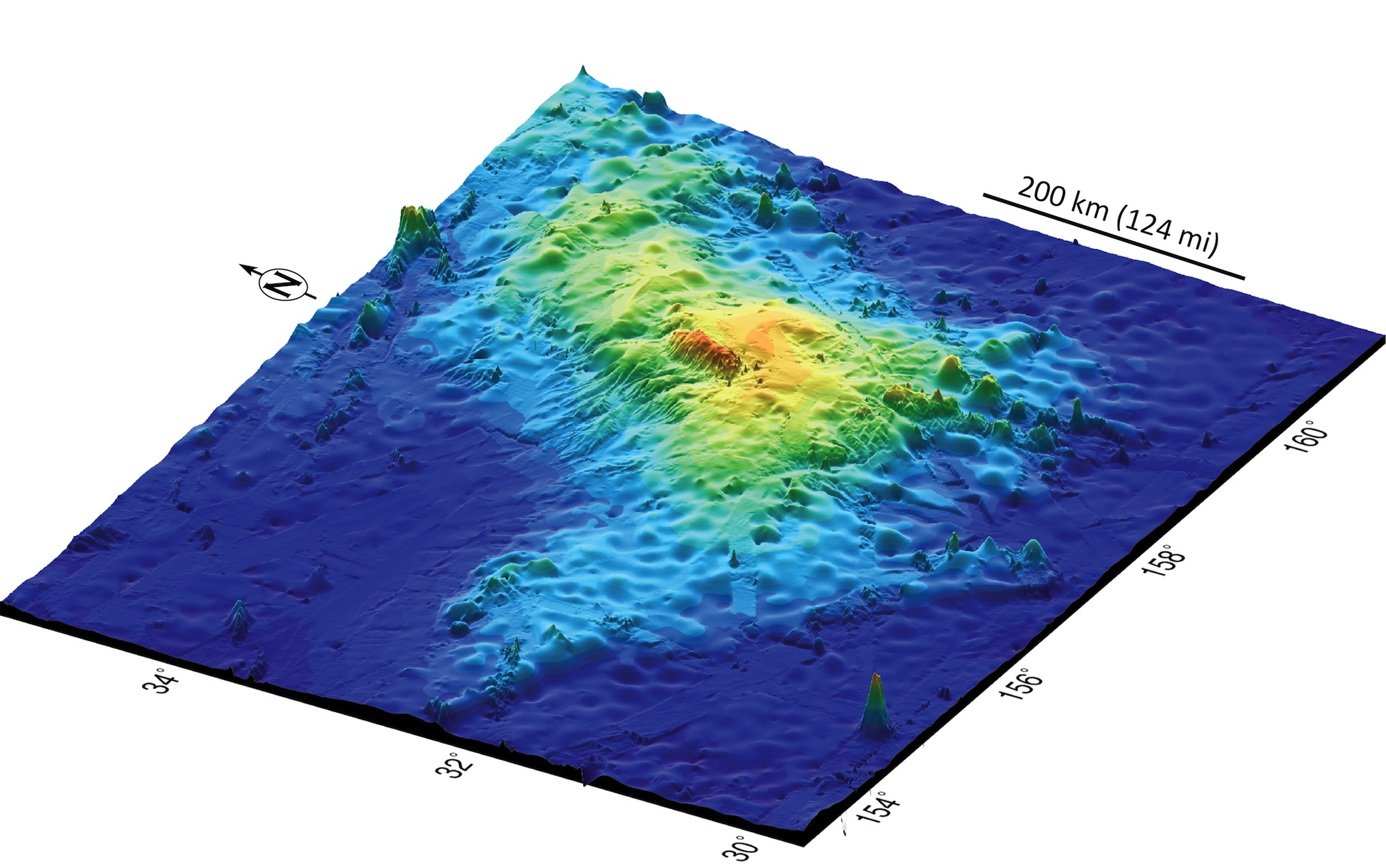
- A bathymetric map of the volcano
- Summit depth: 1,980 metres (6,500 ft)
- Height: 4,460 metres (14,620 ft)

Location
- Location: Northwest Pacific Ocean
- Range: Shatsky Rise
- Coordinates: 33°N 158°E

Geology
- Type: Seamount (underwater volcano), shield volcano
- Age of rock: 144.6 ± 0.8 Ma

Tamu Massif is a seamount in the northwest Pacific Ocean, sitting atop a triple junction of mid-ocean ridges. Tamu Massif is located in the Shatsky Rise about 1,600 km (990 mi) east of Japan. The massif covers an area of about 553,000 square kilometres (214,000 mi^{2}). Its summit is about 1,980 m (6,500 ft) below the surface of the ocean, and its base extends to about 6.4 km (4.0 mi) deep, making it about 4,460 metres (14,620 ft) tall.

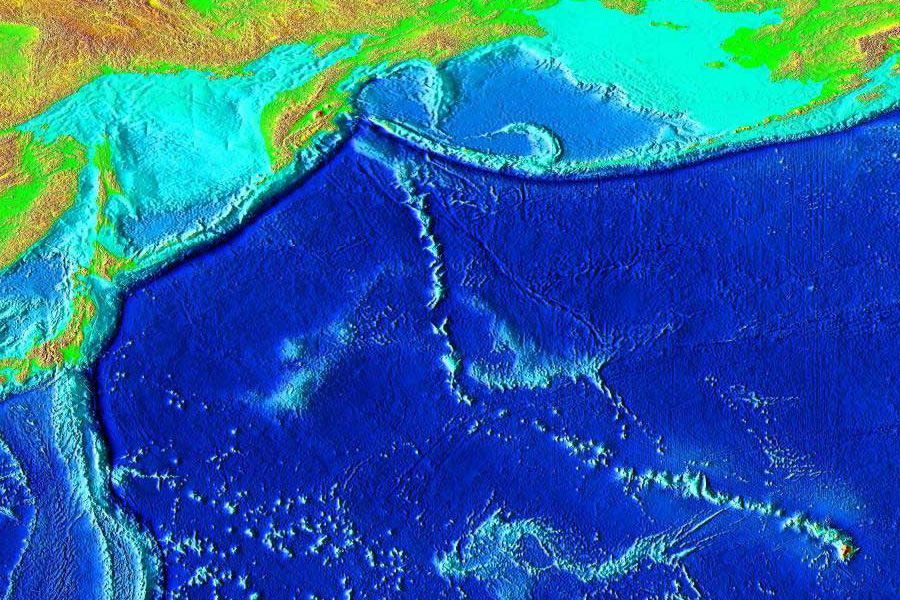
Location of Tamu Massif

William Sager, a marine geophysicist from the Department of Earth and Atmospheric Sciences at the University of Houston, began studying Tamu Massif around 1993 at the Texas A&M College of Geosciences. In September 2013, Sager and his team concluded that Tamu Massif is "the biggest single shield volcano ever discovered on Earth". Other igneous features on the planet are larger, such as the Ontong Java Plateau, but it has not yet been determined if they are indeed just one volcano or rather complexes of several volcanoes.

== Etymology ==
The name Tamu is taken from the initials of Texas A&M University. William Sager, a geology professor and one of the lead scientists studying the volcano, previously taught at Texas A&M. A massif, which means "massive" in French, is a large mountain or a section of the planet's crust that is demarcated by faults and flexures.

== Geology ==
The Tamu Massif was formed about 145 million years ago during the Late Jurassic to Early Cretaceous period over a relatively short period of time (a few million years) and then became extinct. Tamu Massif was formed during a single geologically brief eruptive period, which scientists had previously thought was impossible on Earth. If confirmed, the suggestion that it could be a single volcano would make the Tamu Massif the largest known volcano on Earth, dwarfing the current record-holder, Pūhāhonu, in the Hawaiian Islands. The main part of Tamu's rounded dome extends over an area of 450 km × 650 km (280 mi × 400 mi), totaling more than 292,500 km^{2} (112,900 sq mi), many times larger than Mauna Loa, which has an area of 5,000 km^{2} (1,900 sq mi), and about half the area of the Martian volcano Olympus Mons. (Note: However, other Martian volcanoes, Alba Mons and Syrtis Major, have areas more than twice that of Olympus Mons.) The entire mass of Tamu consists of basalt. Its slopes are very gradual, ranging from less than half a degree to one degree near its summit. The Shatsky Rise oceanic plateau is comparable in size to California or Japan, but Tamu Massif, which is the plateau's oldest and largest edifice, is comparable in size to New Mexico, or Britain and Ireland together. A study in 2016 found that Tamu Massif likely encompassed the entire Shatsky Rise, meaning that Tamu Massif has an area of about 533,000 square kilometres (206,000 mi^{2}), surpassing Olympus Mons in surface area, though it has not yet been determined which of the two volcanoes has a greater mass.

Using magnetic lineations, researchers discovered that there are three bathymetric highs and a low ridge, a topography that would imply three separate volcanoes; but the plume-head model indicates a single massive volcano. Based on multichannel seismic profiles and rock samples from Integrated Ocean Drilling Program (IODP) core sites, Tamu Massif appears to be a single massive volcano made of lava flows that emanated from the volcano centre and formed its shield shape; however, the profiles have large gaps in them, leaving open the possibility that it may represent the activity of more than one volcano. A subsequent study in 2016 found that the massif was likely generated by a single volcano. In 2015, researchers found that the volcano's structure bore patterns of magnetic striping on either side, indicating that the volcano is likely a hybrid of a mid-ocean ridge and a shield volcano. Geologic data also indicated that Tamu Massif formed at the junction of three mid-ocean ridges, which was a highly unusual occurrence.

A study found that the Moho line, the boundary between the Earth's crust and mantle, extends more than 30 kilometres (19 mi) beneath the base of Tamu Massif, meaning that the volcano is unlikely to ever erupt again, since magma is presumably unable to penetrate a barrier that thick.

== See also ==
- Mauna Loa – the third-largest volcano on Earth; also the largest active volcano and the largest volcano extending above sea level
- Gardner Pinnacles – peaks of Pūhāhonu, the second-largest volcano on Earth, the largest shield volcano on Earth, nearly twice as large as Mauna Loa
- Ring of Fire – belt of volcanoes on the rim of the Pacific Ocean
- Tharsis – a massive volcanic plateau on the western hemisphere of Mars that includes Olympus Mons
