= Chucal Formation =

Geological formation in northern Chile

- Stratigraphic range: Miocene
- Type: Geological formation
- Overlies: Lupica Formation

Location
- Region: Arica y Parinacota Region
- Country: Chile

Chucal Formation (Spanish: Formación Chucal) is a volcano-sedimentary geological formation in the Andes of Arica y Parinacota Region in northernmost Chile. Sediments of the formation deposited sometime during the Miocene epoch (23 to 5 million years ago) and represent fluvial and lacustrine environments. It overlies Lupica Formation.
