= William Sager =

William W. Sager (born August 22, 1954, in Washington, DC) is a marine geophysicist from the University of Houston. Before joining the Houston faculty in 2013, he held the Jane and R. Ken Williams ’45 Chair in Ocean Drilling Science at Texas A&M University from 2003 to 2012.

He is best known for his discovery of Tamu Massif—the largest volcano on Earth. Sager began studying Tamu Massif near the end of the 1990s at the Texas A&M College of Geosciences. He and his team published their findings in the September 2013 issue of Nature Geoscience.

Sager did his undergraduate studies in physics at Duke University, graduating magna cum laude in 1976. He went on to graduate studies at the University of Hawaiʻi, finishing his doctorate in marine geophysics in 1983. In the same year, he joined the Texas A&M faculty as an assistant professor.
