= Guayaques =

Mountain in Chile

Guayaques volcanic group
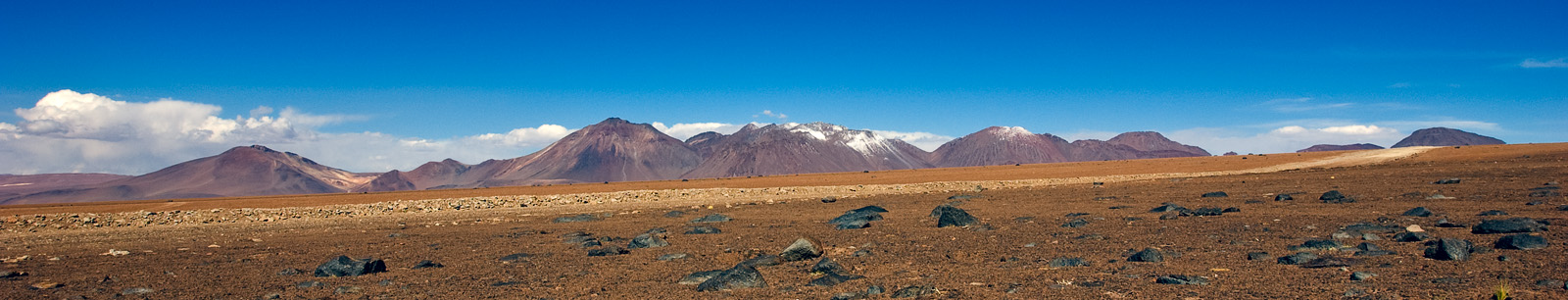
- The Guayaques volcanic group seen from RN 27.

Highest point
- Elevation: 5,076 m (16,654 ft)
- Coordinates: 22°55.731′S 67°34.851′W

Geography
- Location: Bolivia-Chile
- Parent range: Andes

Geology
- Rock age: Holocene
- Mountain type: Lava domes
- Last eruption: Unknown

The 10-km-long Guayaques chain of N-S-trending rhyodacitic lava domes runs across the Chile-Bolivia border about 10 km. east of the Cerro Toco - Purico Complex.

== See also ==
- List of volcanoes in Bolivia
- List of volcanoes in Chile
