= Michel T. Halbouty =

American geologist, petroleum engineer and wildcatter

Michel Thomas Halbouty (21 June 1909 in Beaumont, Texas – 6 November 2004 in Houston, Texas) was an American geologist, petroleum engineer, and wildcatter. Credited with discovering more than 50 oil and gas fields, he twice declared bankruptcy, but came back each time to regain wealth. He authored hundreds of technical articles on petroleum geology, and two book-length histories of famous oil fields. Halbouty is often described, including in his New York Times obituary, as “legendary.”

== Biography ==
Halbouty's father, a Lebanese immigrant, ran a grocery store. Michel Halbouty got his first job in the oil business as a boy, bringing ice water to the drillers at the Spindletop oil field south of Beaumont.

He enrolled at Texas A&M University at age 16. Although he was short of funds, the president of the university personally gave him a $50 loan to cover tuition. He was graduated in 1930 with a double degree in geology and petroleum engineering. The following year he gained a master's degree from Texas A&M, again in both Geology and Petroleum Engineering. He always wore his A&M ring on his left-hand ring finger, and was instrumental in persuading George H. W. Bush to locate his presidential library on the A&M campus.

He discovered his first oil field in 1931, only six weeks out of college, when as a wellsite geologist for the Yount-Lee Oil Co. he drove from the wellsite and interrupted a formal dinner party at the owner's home to persuade the owner not to abandon an apparent dry hole, but to drill deeper. Halbouty staked his job on the result, and drilled into the prolific High Island Field in Texas.

Halbouty served in the US Army during World War II, as an infantry officer, instructor in military science and tactics, and as Chief of the Petroleum Production Section of the Army-Navy Petroleum Board. He attained the rank of Lieutenant-Colonel by the end of the war.

Halbouty was an outspoken proponent of increased American domestic exploration for oil and gas, rather than reliance on foreign sources. He was highly critical of oil companies that cut back exploration efforts in the period of low oil prices during the 1980s and 90s, and especially of the efforts of T. Boone Pickens to dismantle exploration departments at various US oil companies. Halbouty was fond of citing Wallace Pratt's dictum that "Oil is found in the minds of men", to encourage more creativity in oil exploration.

Halbouty died at age 95, while working on a West Texas oil project.

== Honors and offices ==
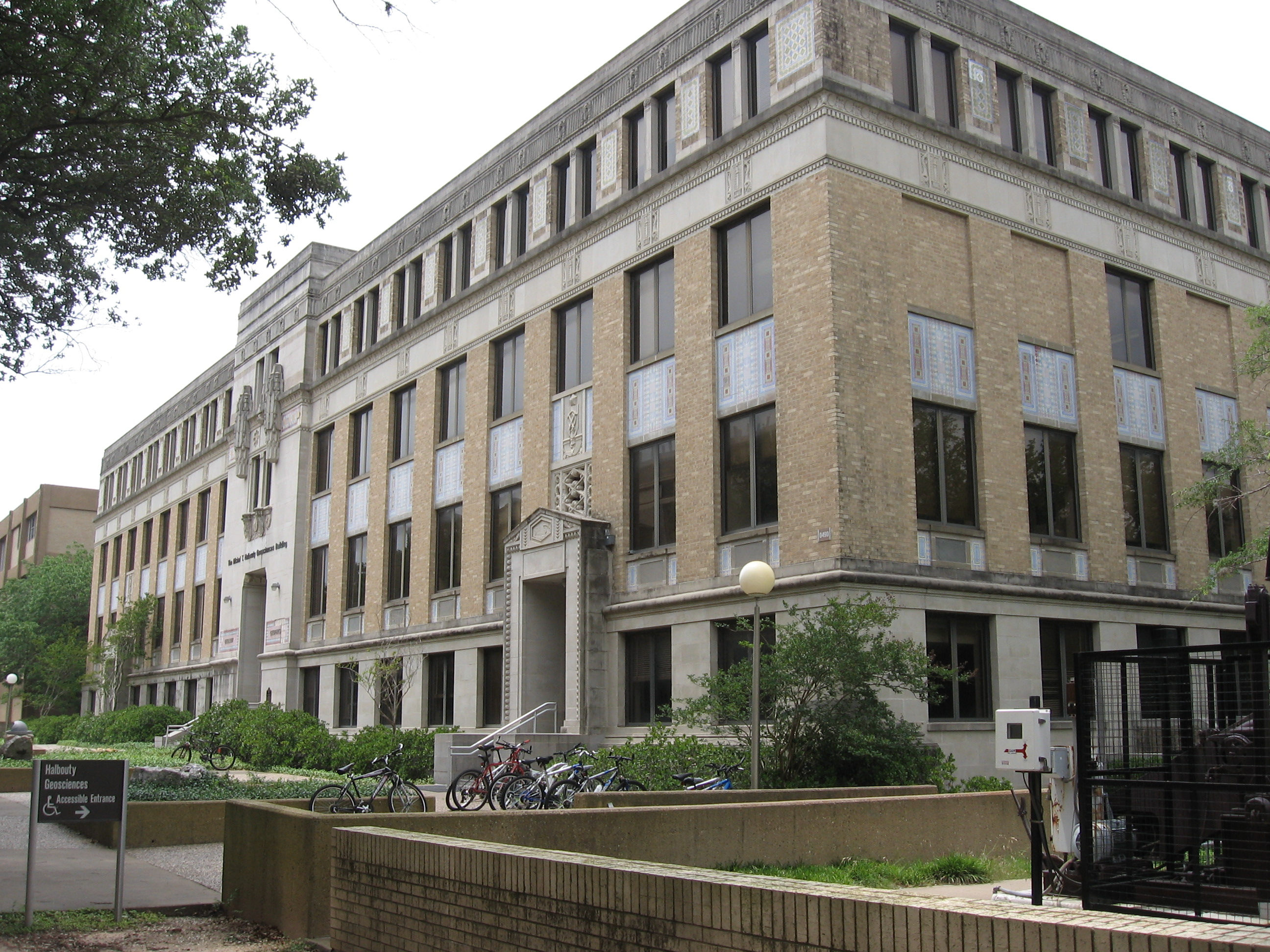
The Michel T. Halbouty Geosciences Building at Texas A&M University

- President of the American Association of Petroleum Geologists (AAPG), 1966
- American Institute of Mining, Metallurgical, and Petroleum Engineers (AIME) honorary membership, 1973
- Horatio Alger Award, 1978
- Hoover Medal recipient, 1982
- Honorary "Doctor of Geoscience" degree from the USSR Academy of Sciences, 1990; the only such honor awarded to a scientist outside the Soviet Union.
- Michel T. Halbouty Geosciences Building at Texas A&M College of Geosciences
- The American Association of Petroleum Geologists awards the Michel T. Halbouty Outstanding Leadership Award to those providing "outstanding and exceptional leadership" in petroleum geosciences.
- Scientific adviser to the Research Institute of Petroleum Exploration and Development, People's Republic of China
- Elected to membership, Chinese Academy of Engineering
- Honorary Professor in Geology, Nanjing University, 1993
- "Legendary Geoscientist Award" recipient from the American Geological Institute, 2002
- Halbouty Road in Nikiski, Alaska

== Published works ==
Halbouty wrote 370 articles and six books.

=== Selected articles ===
- "Rationale for deliberate pursuit of stratigraphic, unconformity, and paleogeomorphic traps," in Stratigraphic Oil and Gas Fields, (1972) Tulsa, Okla.: American Association of Petroleum Geologists, Special Publication 10, p. 3-7.
- "Exploration into the new millennium", in Petroleum Provinces of the Twenty-First Century, (2001) Tulsa, Okla.: American Association of Petroleum Geologists, Memoir 74.

=== Books ===
- Petrographic and Physical Characteristics of Sands from Seven Gulf Coast Producing Horizons, 1937, Houston, Tex.: Gulf Publ. Co.
- Spindletop (with James A. Clark), 1952, New York: Random House,
- Salt Domes, Gulf Region, United States and Mexico, 1969, Houston, Tex.: Gulf Publ. Co.
- Ahead of His Time; Michel T. Halbouty Speaks to the People, (ed. by James A. Clark) 1971, Houston, Tex.: Gulf Publ. Co.
- The Last Boom (with James A. Clark), 1972, New York: Random House, ISBN 0-394-48232-8.
- Drilling in The Future (with Aidil Yunus B. Ismail), January 2014, Tronoh. Malaysia.
