= Oxaya anticline =

The Oxaya anticline is a large north–south aligned anticline and buckle in the Chilean Andes west of the Altiplano Plateau. The anticline is about 60 km long. The anticline constitutes a watershed for smaller streams but is crossed along its short axis by the larger Azapa and Lluta rivers. A series of normal faults and associated grabens exists on top of the Oxaya anticline. These faults have the same NNW-SSE orientation as the long axis of the anticline. The Oxaya anticline developed from the Miocene onwards as a direct or indirect response to east–west shortening of the South American Plate in the context of the Andean orogeny. Three models have been proposed to explain the anticline:

1. That it is a buckle fold with no associated shallow fault
2. That it is the result of movement along a west-vergent thrust fault system or fault-propagation fold
3. That it is a block rotated by a listric fault

The formations deformed by the anticline include Azapa, Huaylas and Oxaya Formation.
