= Texas A&M University College of Geosciences =

Coordinates: 30.617762°N 96.335670°W

College of Geosciences
- Established: 1949; 77 years ago
- Parent institution: Texas A&M University
- Defunct: 2022 (Merged with the College of Liberal Arts and the College of Science to form the College of Arts and Sciences
- Website: geosciences.tamu.edu

The Texas A&M University College of Geosciences was an academic college of Texas A&M University in College Station, Texas. The college had six academic departments and programs, including Atmospheric Sciences, Geography, Geology & Geophysics, Oceanography, Environmental Programs in Geosciences, and the Water Management & Hydrological Science (WMHS) Program. In addition, the College hosted three Research Centers and Institutes: Geochemical & Environmental Research Group (GERG), Integrated Ocean Drilling Program (IODP), and Texas Sea Grant College Program.

In 2022, the College of Geosciences merged with the College of Liberal Arts and the College of Science, along with a few other programs, to form the College of Arts & Sciences.

== Facilities ==
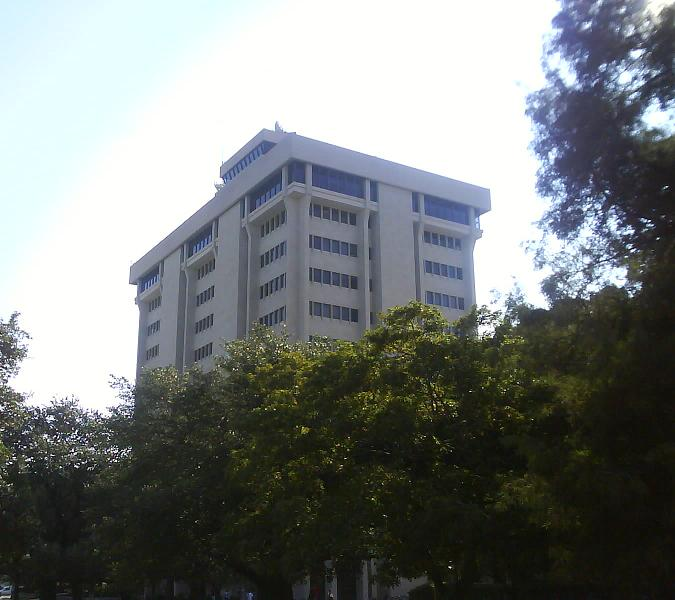
The David G. Eller O&M Building houses the Department of Atmospheric Sciences, the Department of Oceanography, the Department of Geography, and the Dean's Office.

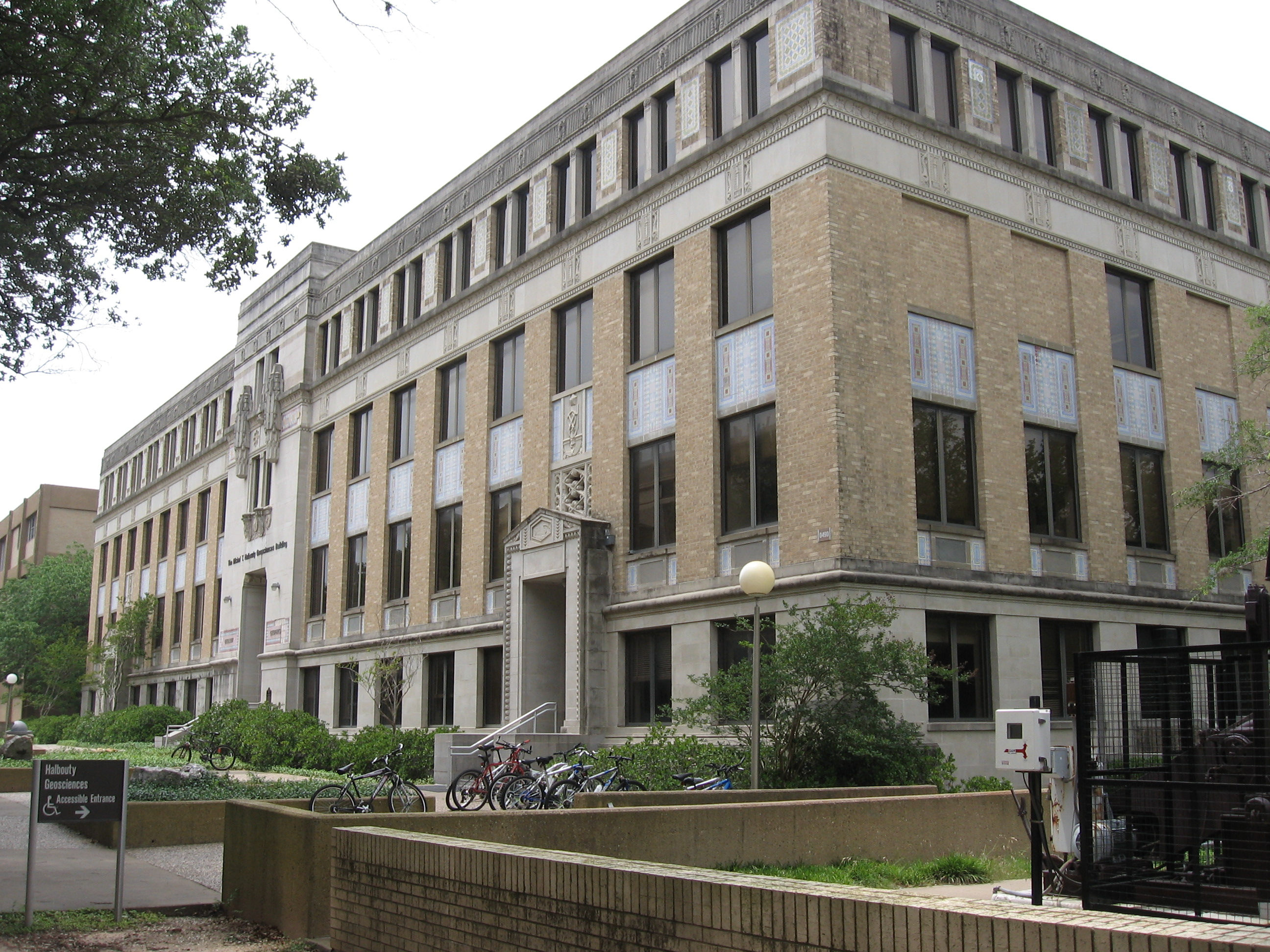
The Michel T. Halbouty Geosciences Building houses the Department of Geology and Geophysics.

The College of Geosciences is located on the main campus of Texas A&M University in College Station, Texas.

The David G. Eller Oceanography & Meteorology Building (O&M Building) has a total of 109,609 square feet (10,183.0 m^{2}) of office, classroom, laboratory and storage space and is home to the Departments of Atmospheric Sciences, Geography, and Oceanography. At 15 floors, it is the tallest building on campus, and hosts a Doppler weather radar System on the roof.

The Michel T. Halbouty Geosciences Building is named in honor of Distinguished Alumnus and successful oil and gas developer Michel T. Halbouty, class of 1930. It has a total of 70,191 square feet (6,521.0 m^{2}) of office, classroom, laboratory and storage space, and is home to the Department of Geology & Geophysics.

IODP is located in Research Park in a 45,277-square-foot (4,206.4 m^{2}) custom built facility. It houses the Laboratory and Core Repository Facility, provides facilities for visiting scientists from around the world, and is the site of a new .5 million Core Storage Facility, which added 10,000 square feet (930 m^{2}) to the existing complex.

GERG is located on 20 acres (81,000 m^{2}) of land approximately five miles south of the Texas A&M main campus. It houses state-of-the-art offices and laboratories for geochemical analysis. It is also the home of the Texas Automated Buoy System (TABS), which was created by the Texas General Land Grant Office in 1994 to provide real-time observations of surface currents and water temperature in the Gulf of Mexico.

Texas Sea Grant is located about three miles (5 km) southeast of the main campus of Texas A&M. It houses administrative offices, Marine Information Service and some members of the Marine Advisory Service.

== Academics ==
The College of Geosciences offers a wide range of undergraduate and graduate degrees. The college offers undergraduate majors in the following areas:

- BS Meteorology
- BS Geographic Information Science and Technology
- BS Geography
- BS Geology (with Environmental and Engineering Geology options)
- BA Geology
- BS Geophysics
- BS Environmental Geosciences
- BS Environmental Studies
- BS Oceanography

The college offers M.S. and Ph.D. degrees in the following areas:

- MS/Ph.D. Atmospheric Sciences
- MS/Ph.D. Geography
- MS/Ph.D. Geology
- MS/Ph.D. Geophysics
- MS/Ph.D. Oceanography
- Master of Geoscience
- Master of Water Management
- MS/Ph.D. Water Management & Hydrological Science

The college offers Minors in the following areas:

- Earth Sciences
- Geography
- Geoinformatics
- Geology
- Geophysics
- Meteorology
- Oceanography

The college has three Certificate Programs:

- Geographic Information Systems
- Remote Sensing
- Ocean Observing Systems

== Students ==
There are more than 7,496 former students of the College of Geosciences. In total the college has awarded 4,852 bachelor's degrees, 1,931 master's degrees, and 713 Doctoral Degrees. As of spring 2008, there were 738 students with majors in Geosciences Degree Programs. 456 students were male, while 282 were female.

== Educators ==
The College of Geosciences is home to 109 faculty, 3 Research Faculty, 27 Research Scientists, 140 Research Staff, and 13 Post Doctoral Fellows. College faculty are among the most respected in their fields. They have garnered numerous awards, including:

- 51 Association of Former Students Distinguished Achievement Awards
- 10 Fulbright Scholars
- 5 Faculty named Regents Professors
- 4 Faculty named Distinguished Professors
- 1 Presidential Professor Awardee

== Resources ==
As of the 2008 Fiscal Year, the Annual University Allocated Operating Budget was $14.1 million, and total endowments were $16.684 million. There are 11 Endowed Chairs, 9 Endowed Professorships, and 43 Endowed Student Scholarships/Fellowships in the College.
