= Streptomyces aridus =

Scientific classification
- Domain: Bacteria
- Kingdom: Bacillati
- Phylum: Actinomycetota
- Class: Actinomycetia
- Order: Streptomycetales
- Family: Streptomycetaceae
- Genus: Streptomyces
- Species: S. aridus

Binomial name
- Streptomyces aridus Idris et al. 2017

Type strain
- NCIMB 14965, strain H9, HI-2016

Species of bacterium

Streptomyces aridus is a bacterium species from the genus Streptomyces which has been isolated from soil from the Atacama Desert.

== See also ==
- List of Streptomyces species
