= Azapa Formation =

Geological formation in northern Chile

- Stratigraphic range: Oligocene
- Underlies: Oxaya Formation

Lithology
- Primary: Fluvial gravel

Location
- Region: Arica y Parinacota Region
- Country: Chile

Azapa Formation (Spanish: Formación Azapa) is a geological formation in northern Chile made up of gravels of fluvial origin. It is conformably overlain by Oxaya Formation. Azapa Formation is deformed by the Oxaya anticline.
