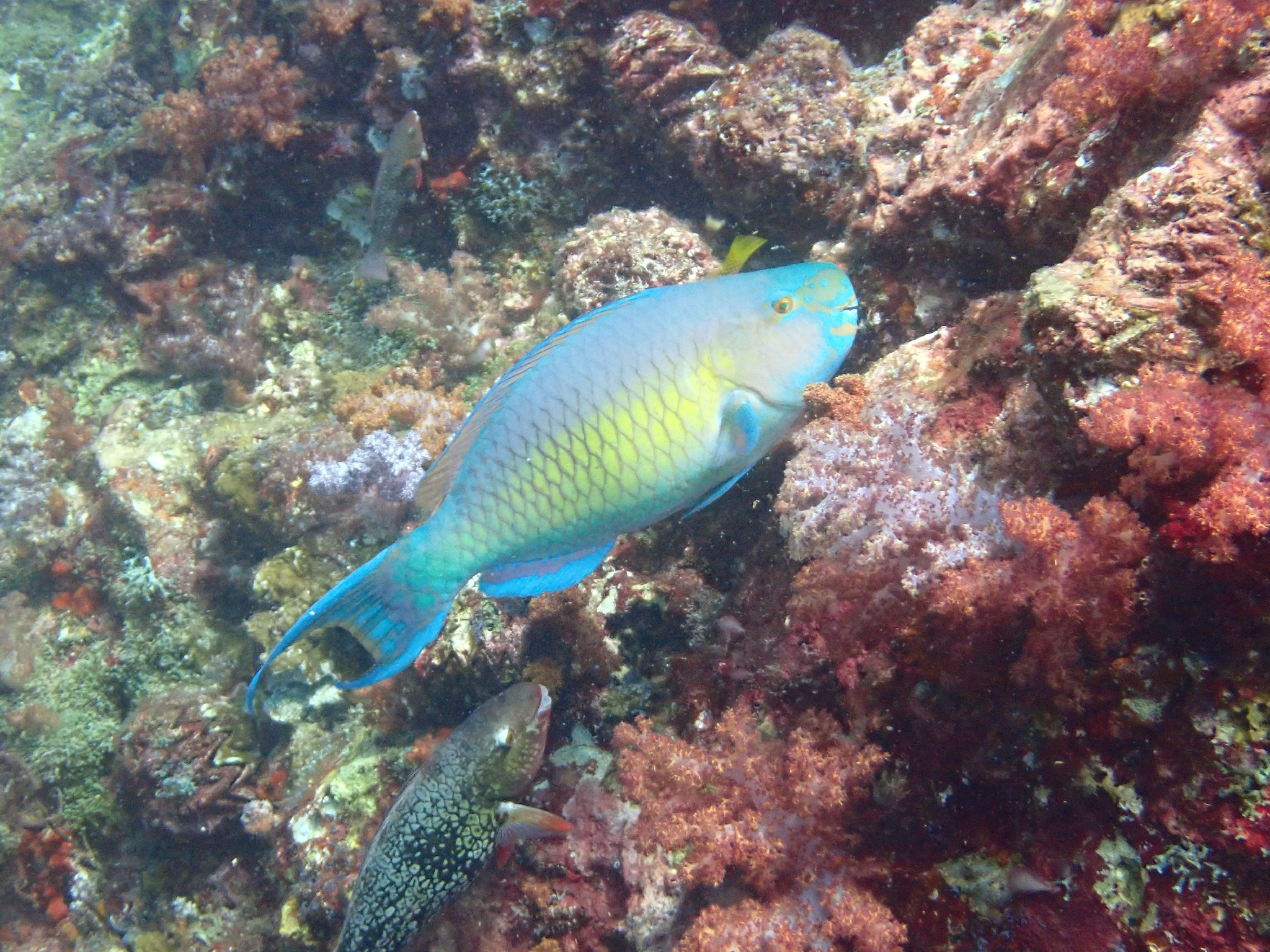
- Male
- Female

Conservation status
- Least Concern (IUCN 3.1)

Scientific classification
- Kingdom: Animalia
- Phylum: Chordata
- Class: Actinopterygii
- Division: Teleostei
- Order: Labriformes
- Family: Labridae
- Genus: Scarus
- Species: S. rubroviolaceus

Binomial name
- Scarus rubroviolaceus Bleeker, 1847

Synonyms
- List: Callyodon rubroviolaceus (Bleeker, 1847); Scarops rubroviolaceus (Bleeker, 1847); Pseudoscarus jordani Jenkins, 1901; Callyodon jordani (Jenkins, 1901); Scarops jordani (Jenkins, 1901); Scarus jordani (Jenkins, 1901); Callyodon ruberrimus Jordan & Seale, 1906; Callyodon africanus J. L. B. Smith, 1955; Margaritodon africanus (J. L. B. Smith, 1955)

= Ember parrotfish =

Species of fish

The ember parrotfish (Scarus rubroviolaceus) is a species of marine ray-finned fish, a parrotfish, in the family Scaridae. It is native to the Indian and Pacific Oceans. It is also known as the bicolor parrotfish and the redlip parrotfish.

== Distribution ==
The ember parrotfish is widespread and abundant. It has been found in the Indian and Pacific Oceans, with its range including Japan, eastern Africa, and the Hawaiian islands.

== Description ==
The species is sexually dimorphic, with the males possessing a bright, greenish-blue color while the females are a duller brown.

== Habitat and behavior ==
Diet includes aquatic plants and benthic algae, which scrape off rocks using their beak. Ember Parrotfish shows sequential hermaphroditism meaning it changes its sex at some point in its life. Juvenile Ember Parrotfish has undifferentiated sex. As it grows, at a body length of about 32 cm at about 2.6 years old, it matures into a female who is reddish brown. It remains as a female for quite some time and when it grows further, at a body length of 37cm it is about 13 years old, it changes its sex into a male. However, some remain female throughout their lives. The Ember Parrotfish also lives up to 20 years.

== Importance to humans ==
The ember parrotfish is commercially fished, and can be kept in saltwater aquariums.

== Gallery ==
Terminal phase

Initial phase

Initial phase

Initial phase schooling
