= Oxaya Formation =

Geological formation in northern Chile

- Stratigraphic range: Late Oligocene–Early Miocene
- Underlies: Zapahuira Formation, Huaylas Formation
- Overlies: Azapa Formation, Lupica Formation?
- Thickness: ca. 1,000 m (3,300 ft)

Lithology
- Primary: Ignimbrite

Location
- Region: Arica y Parinacota Region
- Country: Chile

Type section
- Named for: Oxaya

Oxaya Formation (Spanish: Formación Oxaya) is a geological formation in northern Chile made up of ignimbrite sheets. The formation formed about 25 to 19 million years ago in the Late Oligocene and Early Miocene. Oxaya Formation is deformed by the Oxaya anticline.
