= Texas A&M University College of Arts and Sciences =

College of Arts and Sciences
- Established: 2022; 4 years ago
- Parent institution: Texas A&M University
- Students: 12,869 (Fall 2024)
- Undergraduates: 10,679 (Fall 2024)
- Postgraduates: 2,190 (Fall 2024)
- Website: https://artsci.tamu.edu/

The Texas A&M University College of Arts and Sciences is one of 17 academic colleges and schools of Texas A&M University in College Station, Texas.

== History ==
The college was formed in 2022 from the merger of three existing colleges: the College of Geosciences (originally formed in 1949), the College of Liberal Arts, and the College of Science (the latter two originally founded in 1924 as the School of Arts and Science, then split in 1965), along with some other programs from other colleges. Three departments which would otherwise have been included in the merger (Dance Science, Performance and Visual Studies, and Visualization) instead formed the new School of Performance, Visualization & Fine Arts at that time.

In 2023, Inside Higher Ed reported that Jay Graham, a member of the Texas A&M University System Board of Regents, claimed in a text that the reason the college was consolidated was "to control the liberal nature that those professors brought to campus.”

== Academics ==
=== Academic Departments ===
The College of Arts and Sciences operates under 18 departments:

- Anthropology
- Atmospheric Science
- Biology
- Chemistry
- Communications and Journalism
- Economics
- English
- Geography
- Geology and Geophysics
- Global Languages and Cultures
- History
- Mathematics
- Oceanography
- Philosophy
- Physics and Astronomy
- Physiological and Brain Sciences
- Sociology
- Statistics
